= Cultural depictions of lions =

The lion has been an important symbol to humans for tens of thousands of years. The earliest graphic representations feature lions as organized hunters with great strength, strategies, and skills. In later depictions of human cultural ceremonies, lions were often used symbolically and may have played significant roles in magic, as deities or close association with deities, and served as intermediaries and clan identities.

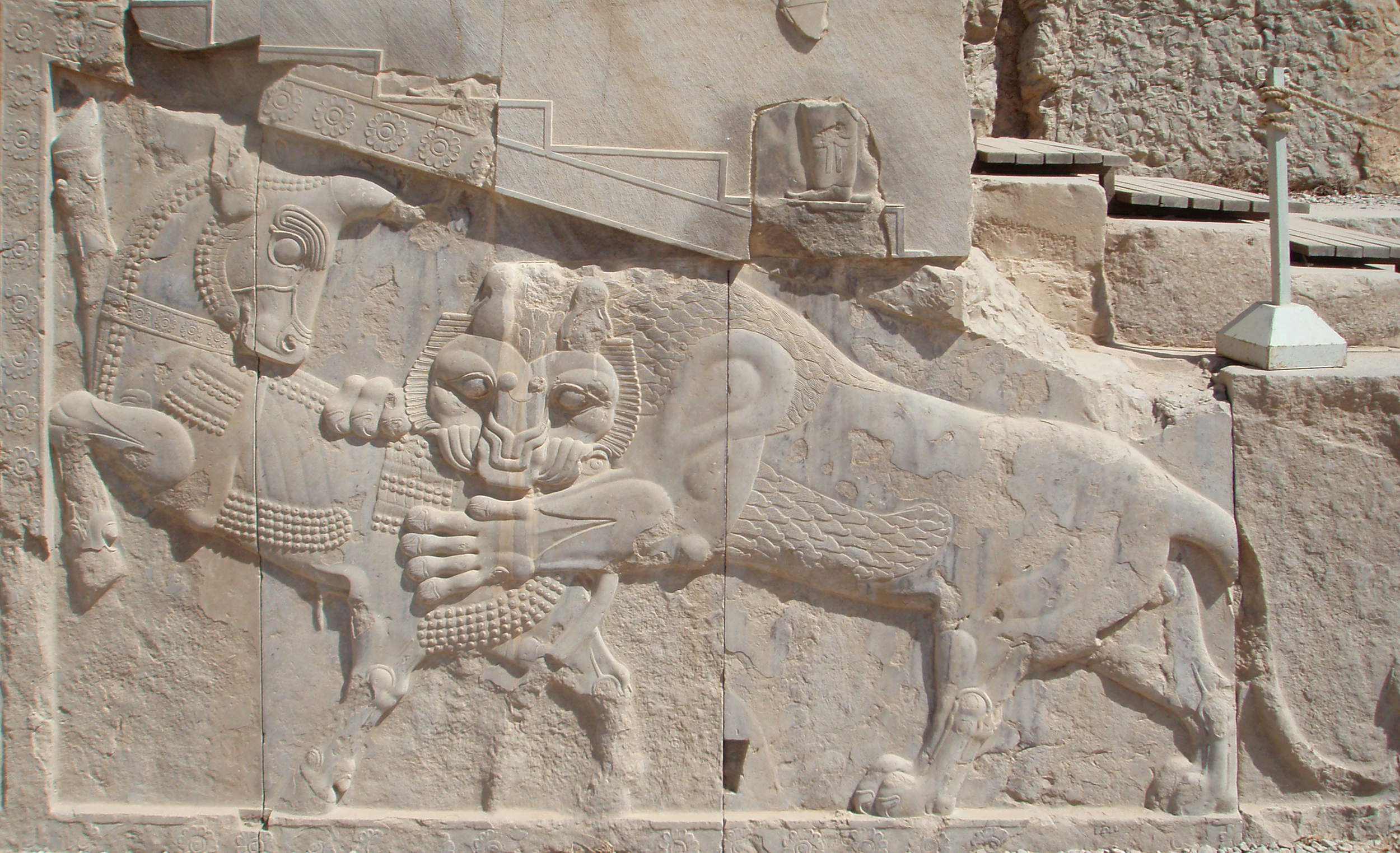
An ancient relief at Persepolis for Nowruz: eternal combat between the bull, representing the Moon, and the lion, representing the Sun and spring.

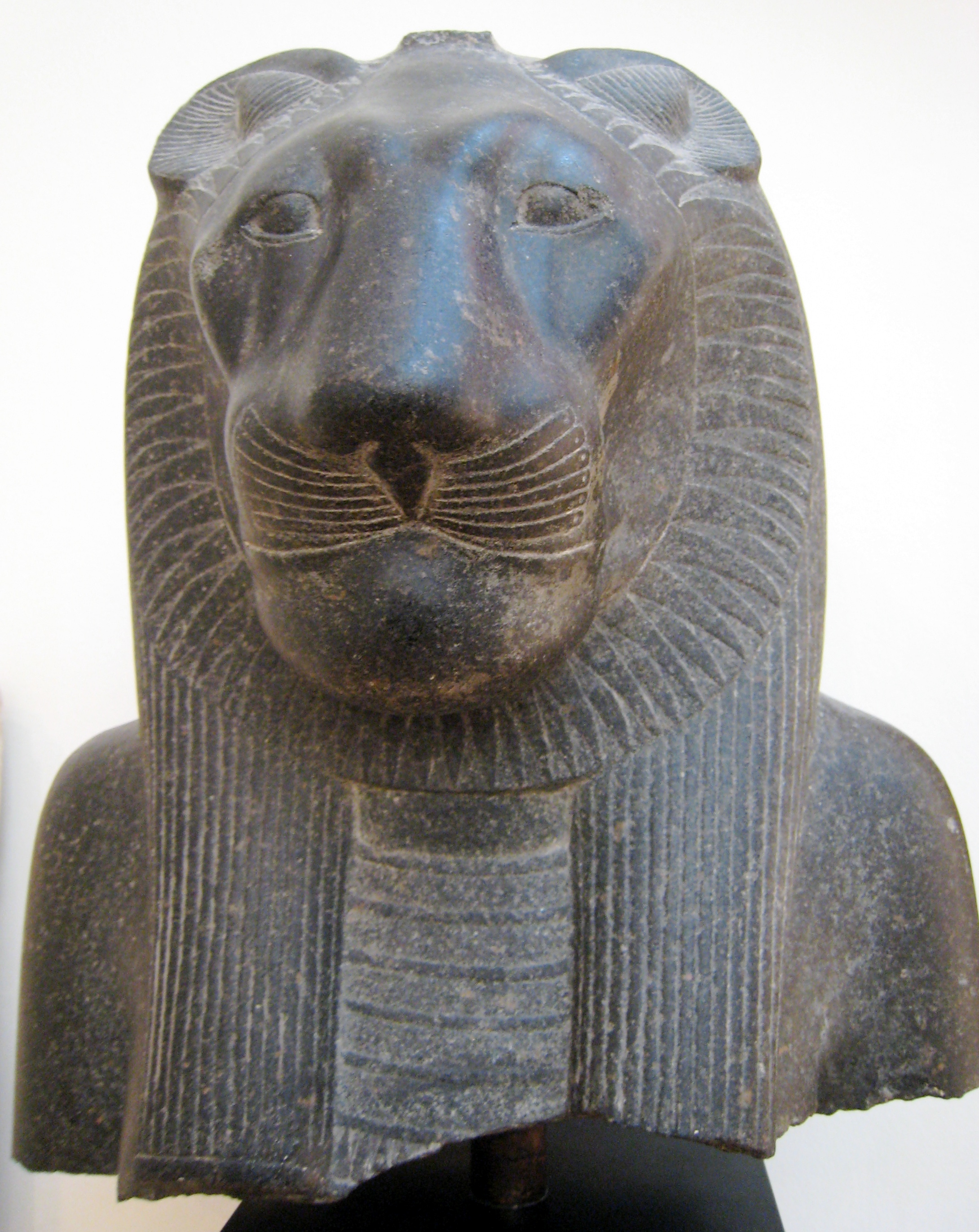
Granite statue of the lion-headed Egyptian deity Sekhmet from the temple of Mut at Luxor, dating to 1403–1365 BC, exhibited in the National Museum of Denmark

== History, religion, and mythology ==
=== First depictions ===
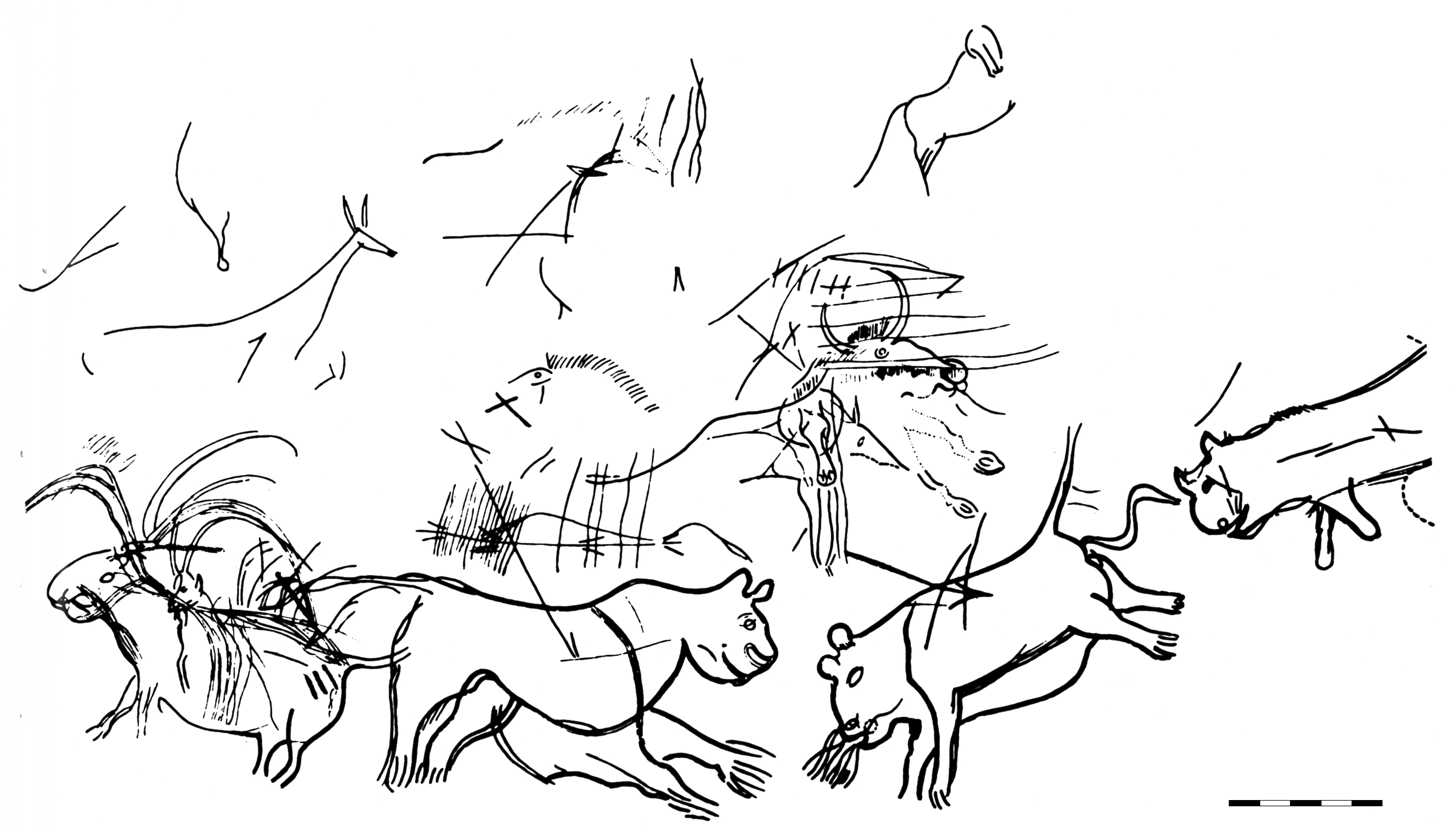
Cave lions, Chamber of Felines, Lascaux caves

The earliest known cave paintings of lions (which are of the extinct species Panthera spelaea) were found in the Chauvet Cave and in Lascaux in France's Ardèche region and represent some of the earliest paleolithic cave art, dating to between 32,000 and 15,000 years ago. The zoomorphic Löwenmensch figurine from Hohlenstein-Stadel and the ivory carving of a lion's head from Vogelherd Cave in the Swabian Jura in southwestern Germany were carbon-dated 39,000 years old, dating from the Aurignacian culture.

=== Ancient Egypt ===
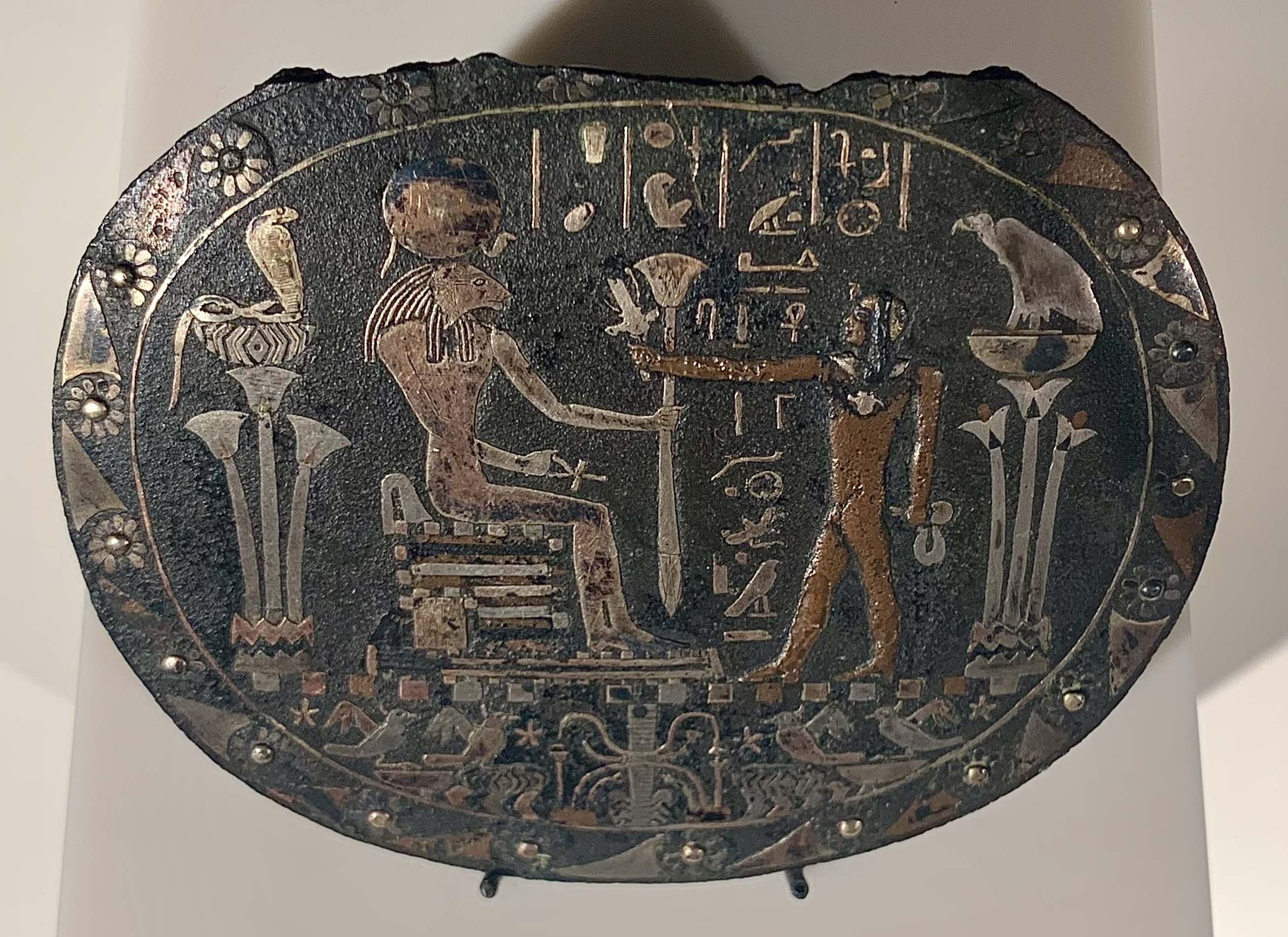
Detail of a ritual Menat necklace, exhibited at Altes Museum, Berlin, catalogue number 23733. It shows a ritual performed before a statue of Sekhmet sitting on her throne. Sekhmet is flanked by the goddess Wadjet as the cobra and the goddess Nekhbet as the white vulture, symbols of lower and upper Egypt, respectively. They were depicted on the crown of Egypt; this triad remained fundamental to ancient Egyptian religion throughout the rise and fall of other deities

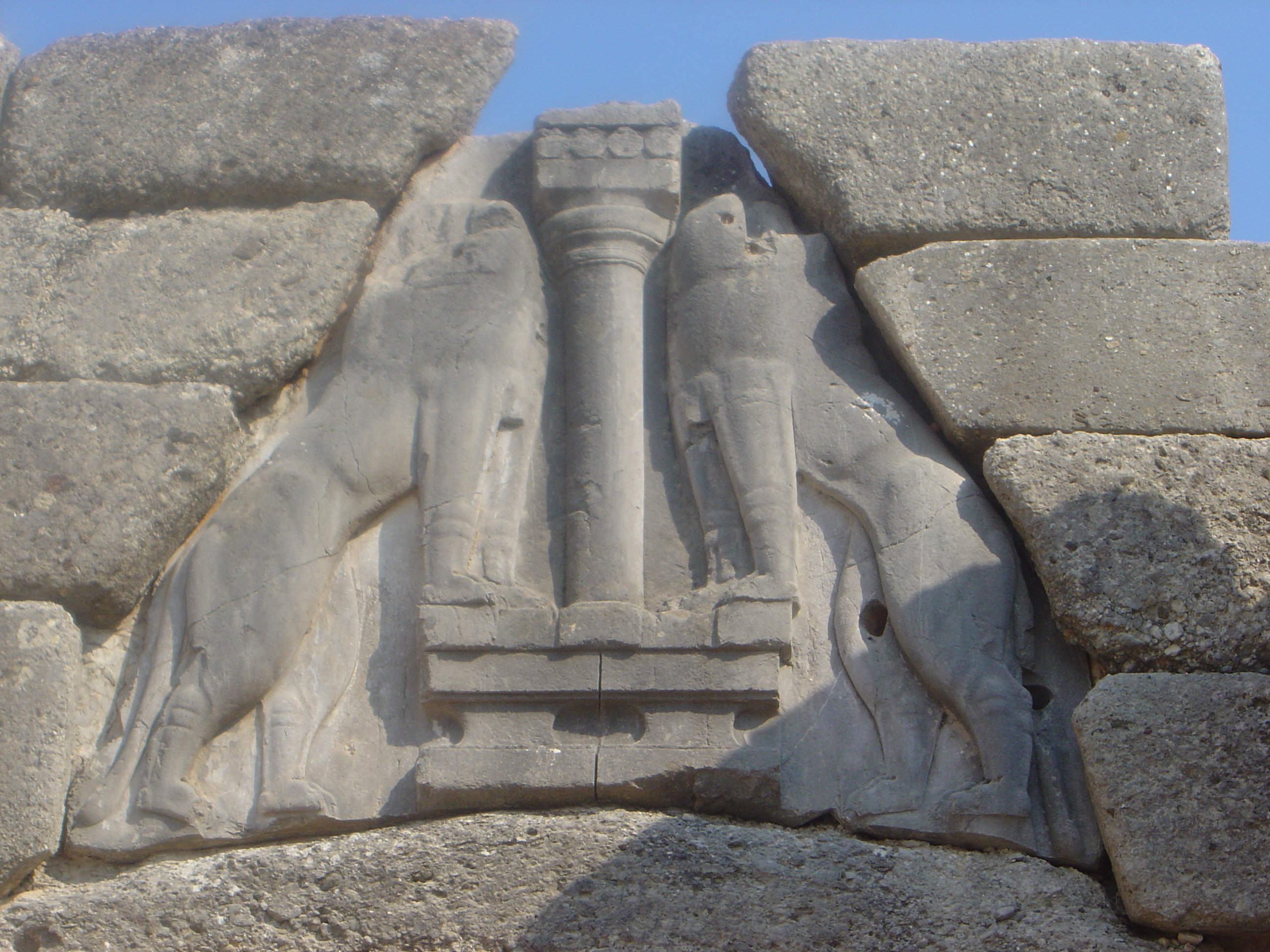
The Lion Gate of Mycenae; two confronted animals flank the central column

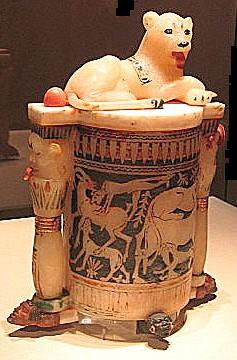
An alabaster cosmetic jar topped with Bast, from the tomb of Tutankhamun (c. 1323 BC—Cairo Museum)

The earliest tomb paintings in Ancient Egypt, at Nekhen, c. 3500 BC, classified as Naqada, possibly Gerzeh, culture include images of lions, including an image of a human (or deity) flanked by two lions in an upright posture. Among ancient Egyptians, from prehistoric times through well documented records, the war goddess Sekhmet, a lioness, later depicted as woman with a lioness head, was one of their major deities. She was a sun deity as well as a fierce warrior and protector. Usually she was assigned significant roles in the natural environment. The Egyptians held that this sacred lioness was responsible for the annual flooding of the Nile, the most significant contributing factor to the success of the culture. Sometimes with regional differences in names, a lioness deity was the patron and protector of the people, the king, and the land. As the country united, a blending of those deities was assigned to Sekhmet.

Similar regional lioness deities assumed minor roles in the pantheon or, when so significant in a region, continued local religious observance in their own right, such as Bast. Offspring of these deities found niches in the expanding pantheon as well.

During the New Kingdom the Nubian gods Maahes (god of war and protection and the son of Bast) and Dedun (god of incense, hence luxury and wealth) were depicted as lions. Maahes was absorbed into the Egyptian pantheon, and had a temple at the city the invading Greeks called Leontopolis, "City of Lions", at the delta in Lower Egypt. His temple was attached to the major temple of his mother, Bast. Dedun was not absorbed into the Ancient Egyptian religion and remained a Nubian deity.

Bast, originally depicted as a lioness and the "eye of Ra" in the delta region, was the parallel deity to Sekhmet in the southern region. Her nature gradually changed after the unification of the country and Sekhmet prevailed throughout. At that time Bast changed into the goddess of personal protection with different responsibilities, and often was depicted as a very tame lioness or a cat. She is shown to the left atop an alabaster jar that contained precious oils and lotions. The name of the stone probably bears her name because materials sacred to her usually were stored in it.

The sphinx of Ancient Egypt shows the head and shoulders of a human and the body of a lioness. The statue represents Sekhmet, who was the protector of the pharaohs. Later pharaohs were depicted as sphinxes, being thought of as the offspring of the deity.

=== Iran ===
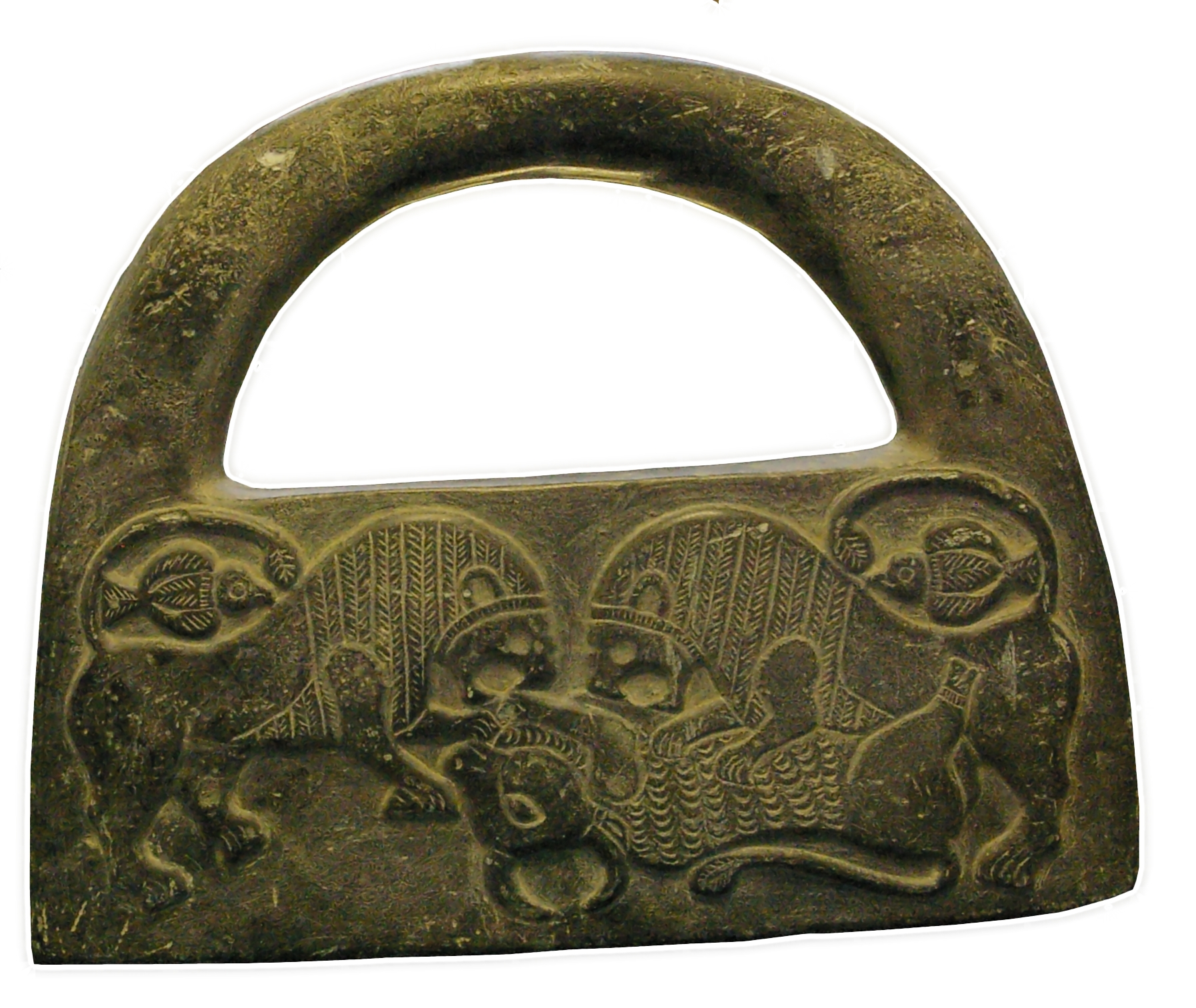
Lions on A Chlorite object from Jiroft, currently at the National Museum of Iran, 3rd mil. BC

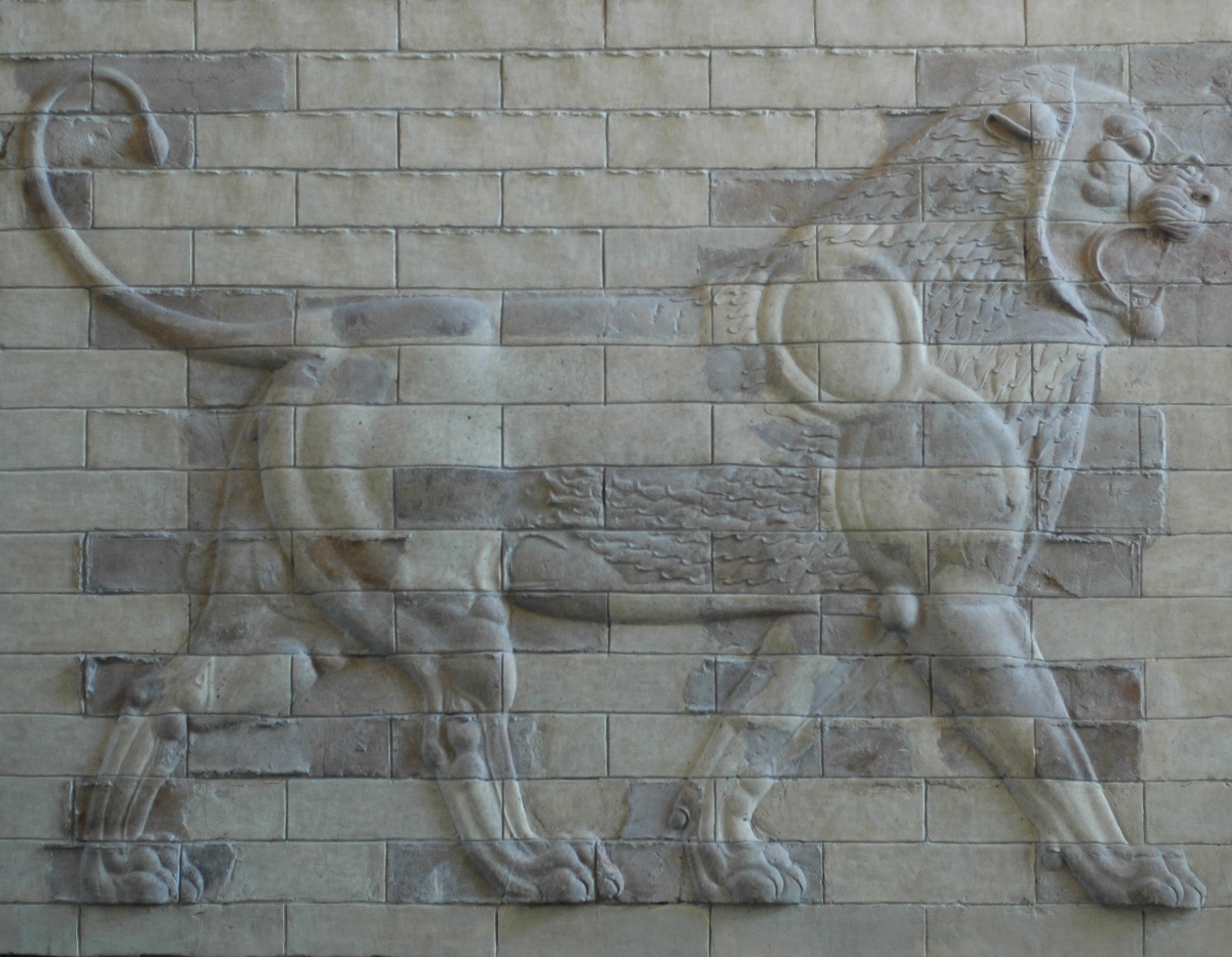
Lion on a decorative panel from Darius I the Great's palace at Susa

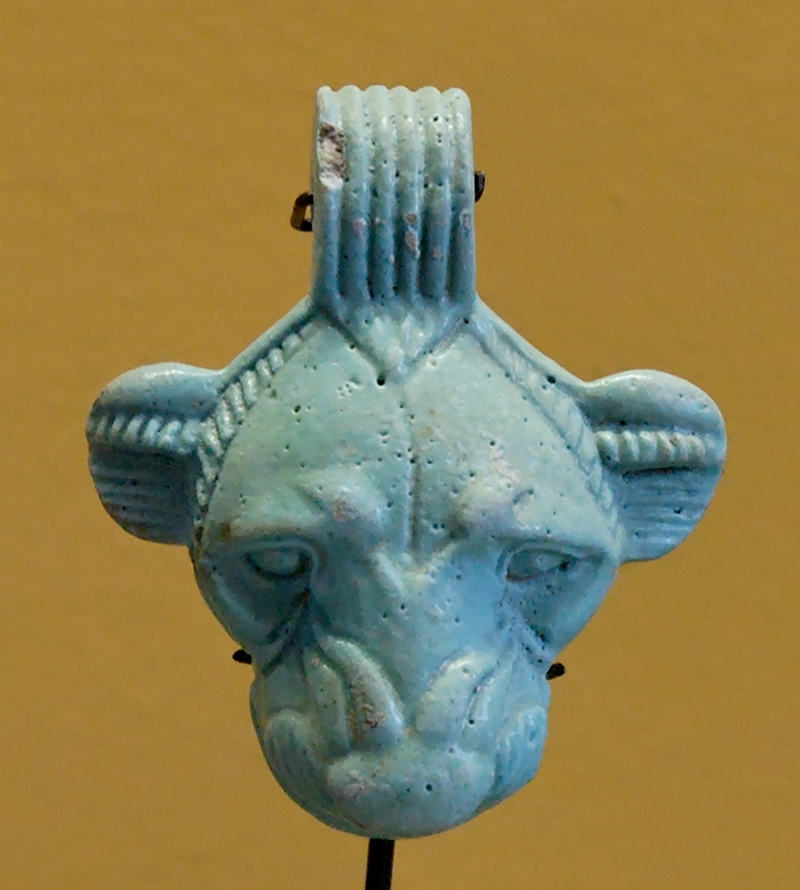
Lioness used as a pendant, late sixth–fourth centuries BC, from Susa, Louvre

Lions are depicted on vases dating to about 2600 before present that were excavated near Lake Urmia. In Iranian mythology, the lion is a symbol of courage and monarchy. It is portrayed standing beside the kings in artifacts and sitting on the graves of knights. Imperial seals were also decorated with carved lions. The lion and sun motif is based largely on astronomical configurations, and the ancient zodiacal sign of the sun in the house of Leo. Lion and sun is a symbol of royalty in Iranian flag and coins. Goddess Anahita was sometimes shown standing on a lion. Lion is also title of the fourth grade of mithraism.

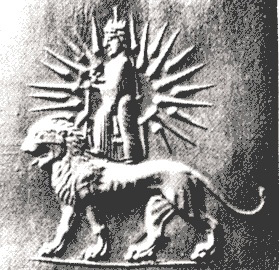
The first symbol of the lion and Sun, which is related to the Achaemenid period.

Lions have been extensively used in ancient Persia as sculptures and on the walls of palaces, in fire temples, tombs, on dishes and jewellery; especially during the Achaemenid Empire. The gates were adorned with lions.

=== Ancient Mesopotamia ===
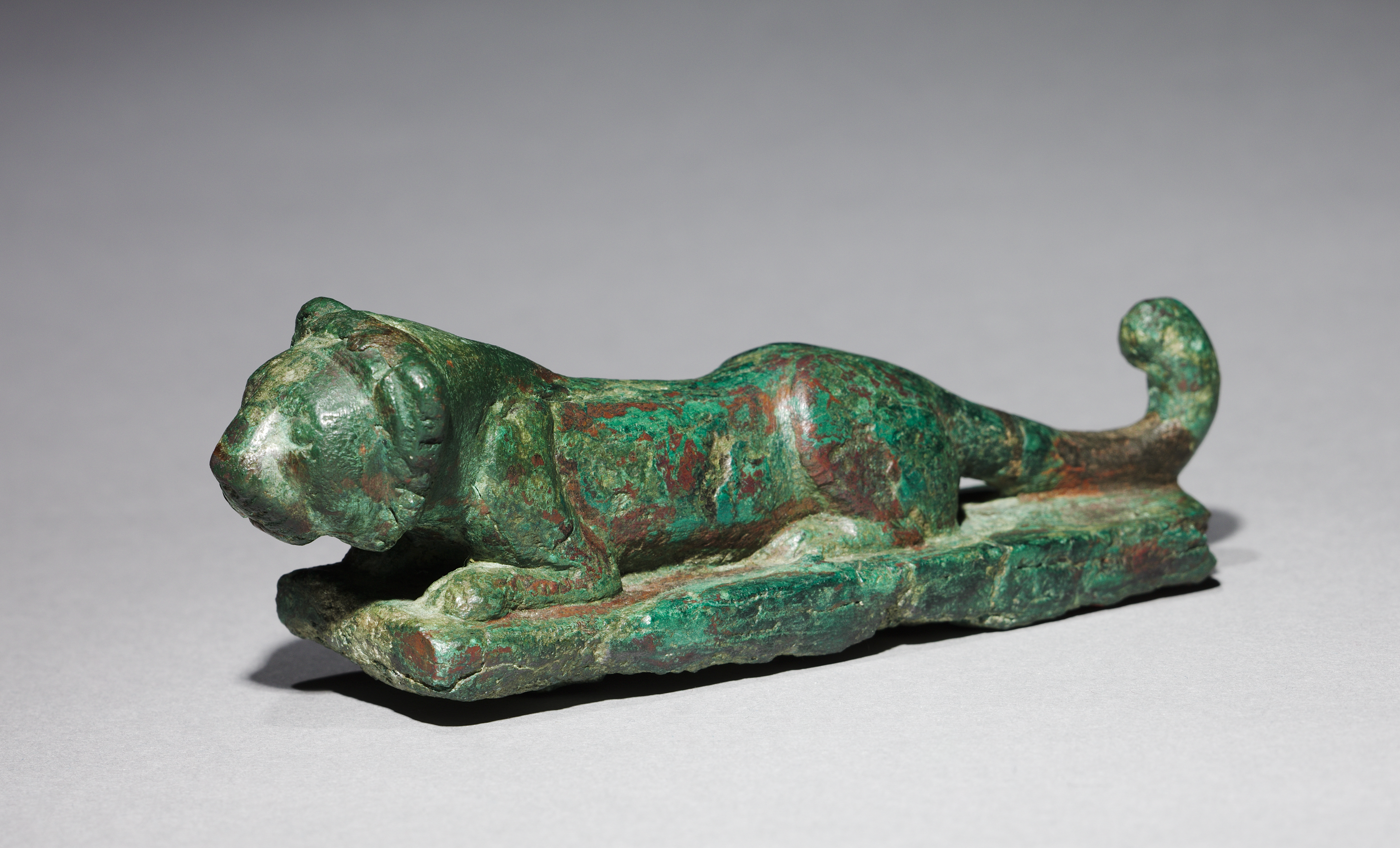
Sumerian, Iraq, c. 2100 BC

In ancient Mesopotamia, the lion was regarded as a symbol of kingship. Depictions of the Mesopotamian lion show that it was an important symbol of Ancient Iraq. It is depicted in Ninevan reliefs. The lion of Babylon is a statue at the Ishtar Gate in Babylon The lion has an important association with the figure Gilgamesh, as demonstrated in his epic. The Babylonian goddess Ishtar was represented driving a chariot drawn by seven lions.

The Iraqi national football team is nicknamed "Lions of Mesopotamia."

The Lion of Babylon from a portion of the Processional Way leading to the Ishtar Gate.

Sculptures and reliefs of the Neo-Assyrian Empire dating to the 6th and 7th centuries BC were rediscovered and excavated in the mid 19th century. Several reliefs feature lions, including the Lion Hunt of Ashurbanipal, a famous group of Assyrian palace reliefs with numerous small narrative scenes, now in the British Museum. A well-known detail of this group of reliefs is The Dying Lioness depicting a half-paralyzed lioness pierced with arrows. They were originally in an Assyrian royal palace in Nineveh, in modern-day Iraq.

=== Europe ===
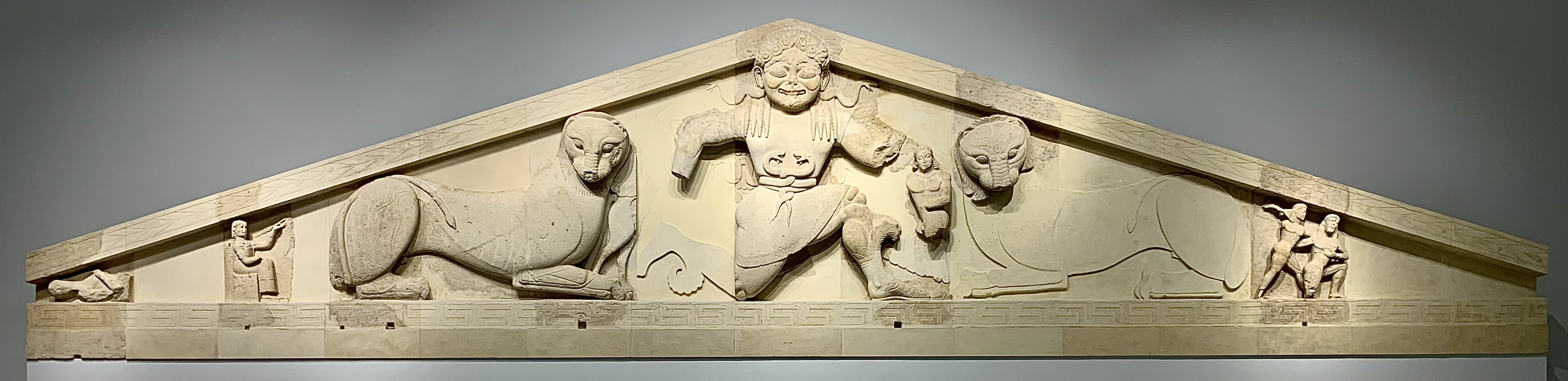
Lionesses flanking the Gorgon on the western pediment of the Artemis Temple of Corfu, exhibited by the Archaeological Museum of Corfu

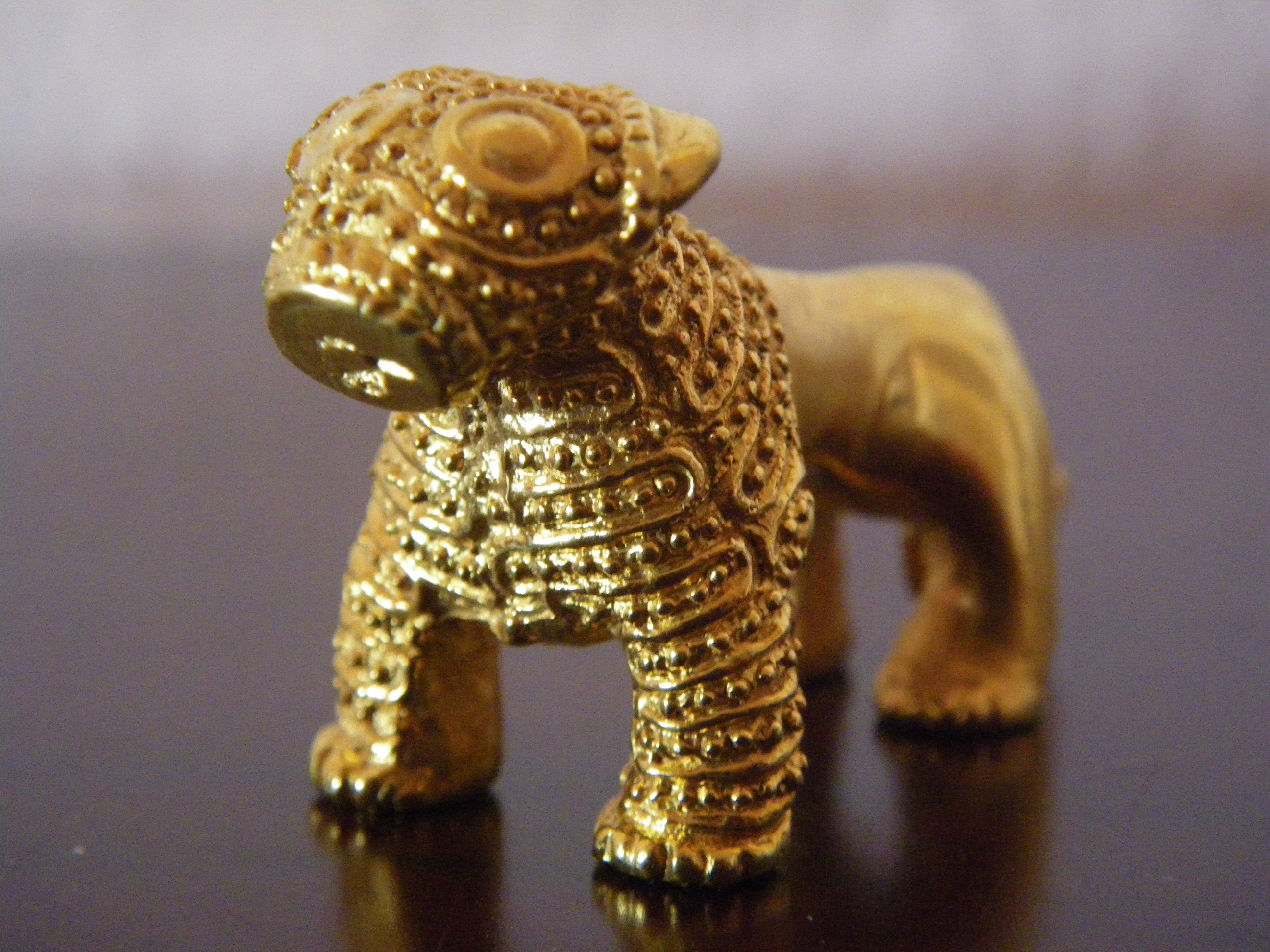
Golden figure from Colchis on display in the Georgian National Museum

A bronze statue of a lion from either southern Italy or southern Spain, from c. 1000–1200 years CE was put on display at the Louvre Abu Dhabi.

=== Ancient sculptures ===
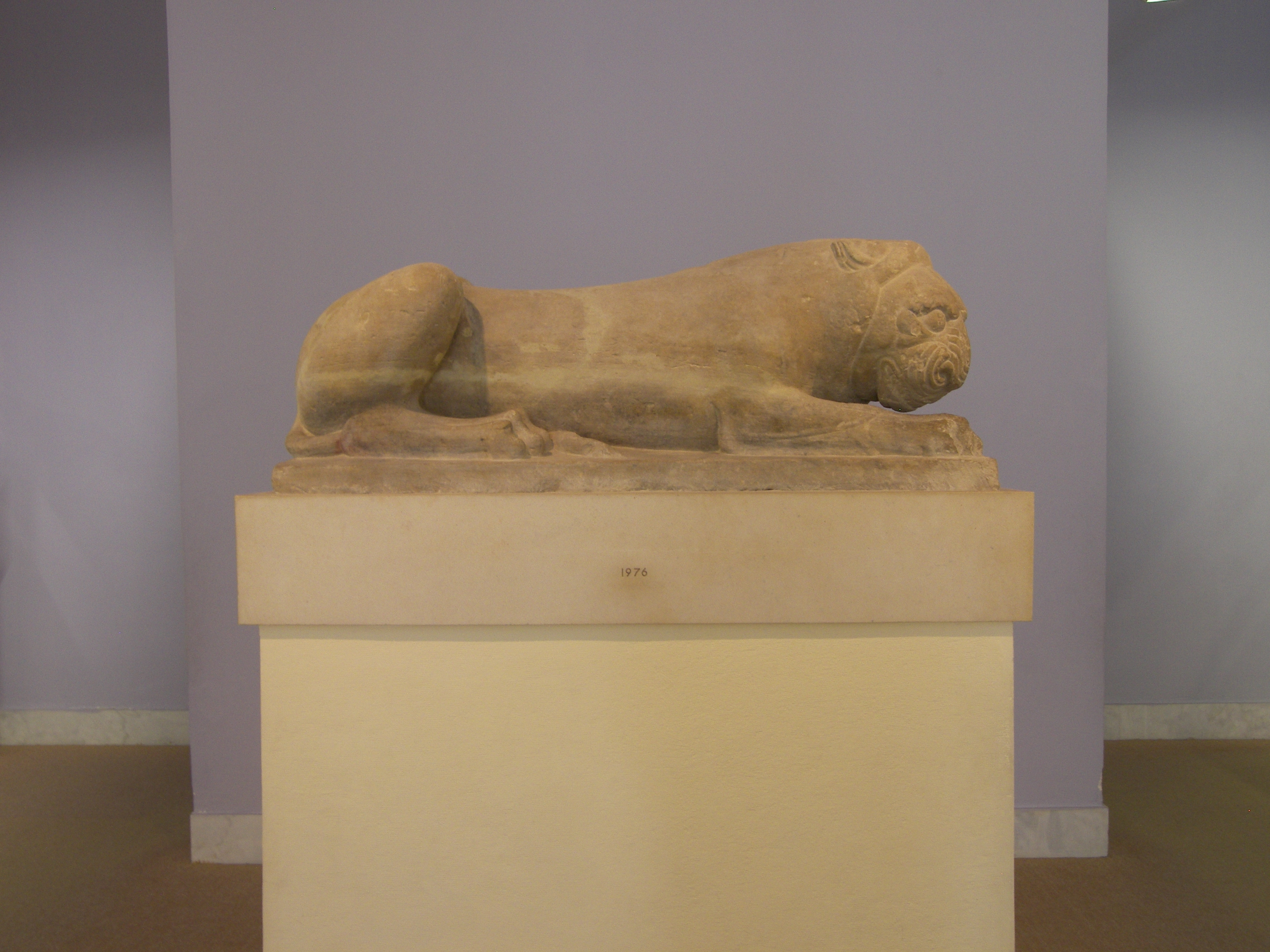
Lion of Menekrates, seventh century BC

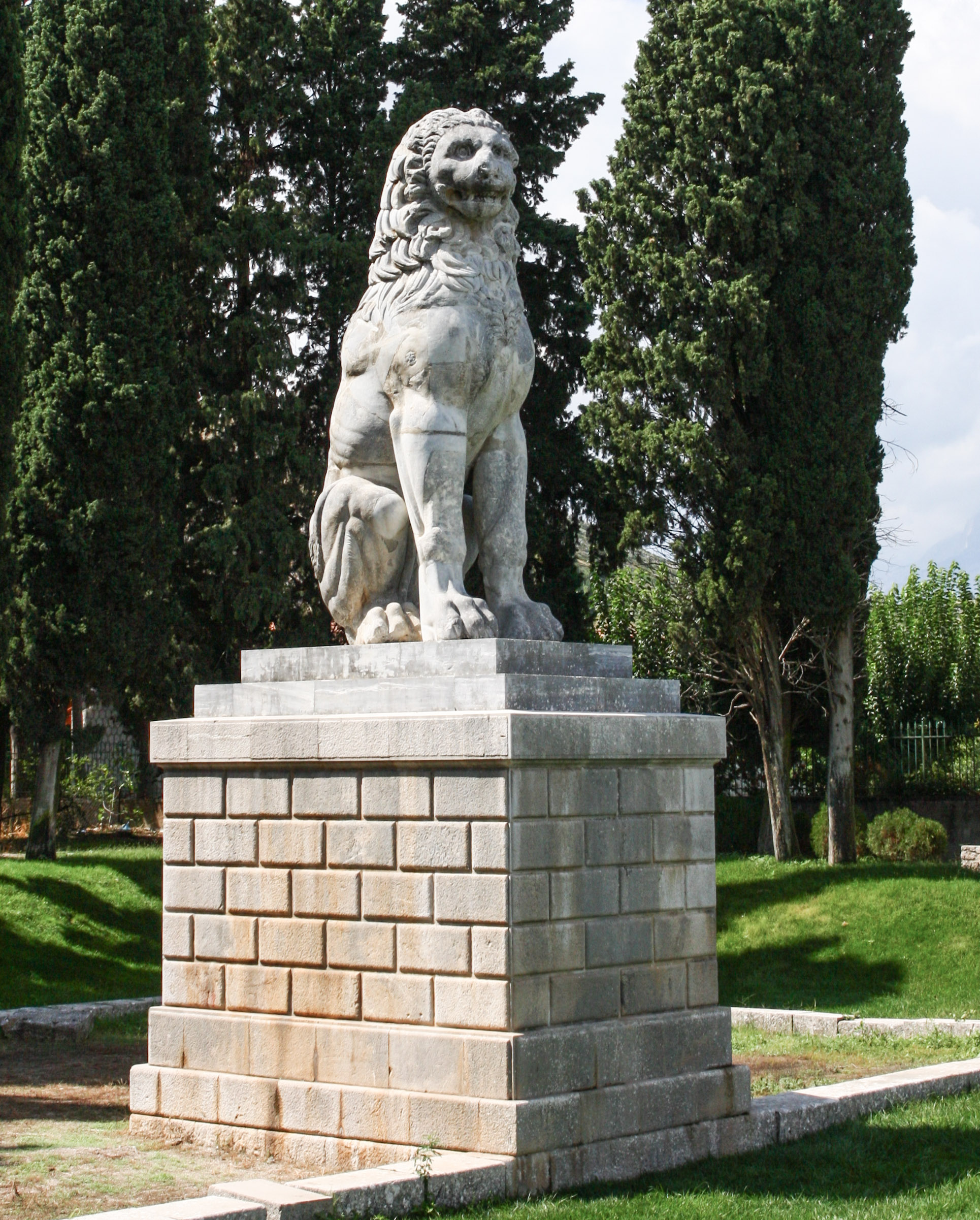
The Lion of Chaeronea, Greek, after 338 BC

Lions have been widely used in sculpture to provide a sense of majesty and awe, especially on public buildings. Lions were bold creatures and many ancient cities would have an abundance of lion sculptures to show strength in numbers as well. This usage dates back to the origin of civilization. There are lions at the entrances of cities and sacred sites from Mesopotamian cultures; notable examples include the Lion Gate of ancient Mycenae in Greece that has two lionesses flanking a column that represents a deity, and the gates in the walls of the Hittite city of Bogazköy, Turkey.

=== Classical period ===
Several discoveries of lion bones in Greece, Ukraine and the Balkans have confirmed that lions lived there certainly from 5th millennium BC until the 6th century BC, while according to the written sources they survived up to perhaps the 1st or even the 4th century AD, which was previously only a suspicion by some archaeologists. Thus the strong emphasis on lions in the earliest figurative Greek art, especially that of Mycenaean Greece from around 1600–1400 BC, reflected the world in which Greeks lived, rather than being based on stories from further east, as once thought.

Lionesses often flanked the Gorgon, a vestige of the earliest Greek protective deity that often was featured atop temples of later eras. The western pediment from the Artemis Temple of Corfu is a well preserved example. The most notable lion of Ancient Greek mythology was the Nemean lion, killed barehanded by Heracles, who subsequently bore the pelt as an invulnerable magic cloak.

This lion is also said to be represented by the constellation of Leo, and also the sign of the Zodiac. Lions are known in many cultures as the king of animals, which can be traced to the Babylonian Talmud, and to the classical book Physiologus. In his fables, the famed Greek story teller Aesop used the lion's symbolism of power and strength in The Lion and the Mouse and Lion's Share.

Since classical antiquity, a Gaetulian lion in literature is a lion of fierce reputation. Gaetulia, in ancient geography, was the land of the Gaetuli, a warlike tribe of ancient Libya that appears in Virgil's Aeneid (19 BC). The Gaetulia lion appears in Odes of Horace (23 BC), Pliny the Elder's Natural History (77 AD), Philostratus's Life of Apollonius of Tyana (c. 215), Robert Louis Stevenson's Travels with a Donkey in the Cévennes (1879).

In Socrates' model of the psyche (as described by Plato), the bestial, selfish nature of humanity is described metaphorically as a lion, the "leontomorphic principle".

=== Biblical references and Jewish-Christian tradition ===
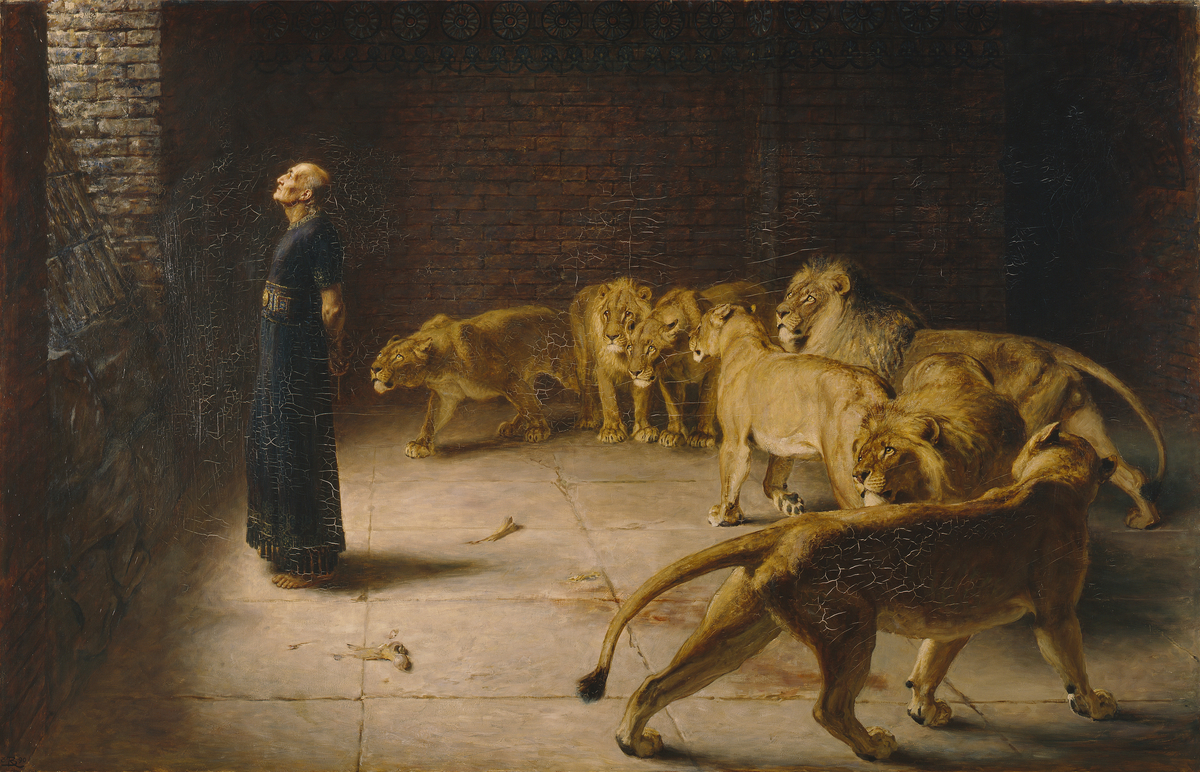
Daniel's Answer to the King by Briton Rivière, R.A. (1840–1920), 1890 (Manchester City Art Gallery)

Several Biblical accounts document the presence of lions, and cultural perception of them in ancient Israel. The best known Biblical account featuring lions comes from the Book of Daniel (chapter 6), where Daniel is thrown into a den of lions and miraculously survives.

A lesser known Biblical account features Samson who kills a lion with his bare hands, later sees bees nesting in its carcass, and poses a riddle based on this unusual incident to test the faithfulness of his fiancée (Judges 14). The prophet Amos said (Amos, 3, 8): "The lion hath roared, who will not fear? the Lord GOD hath spoken, who can but prophesy?", i.e., when the gift of prophecy comes upon a person, he has no choice but to speak out.

The lion is one of the living creatures in the Book of Ezekiel. They were represented in the tetramorph.

In 1 Peter 5:8, the Devil is compared to a roaring lion "seeking someone to devour."

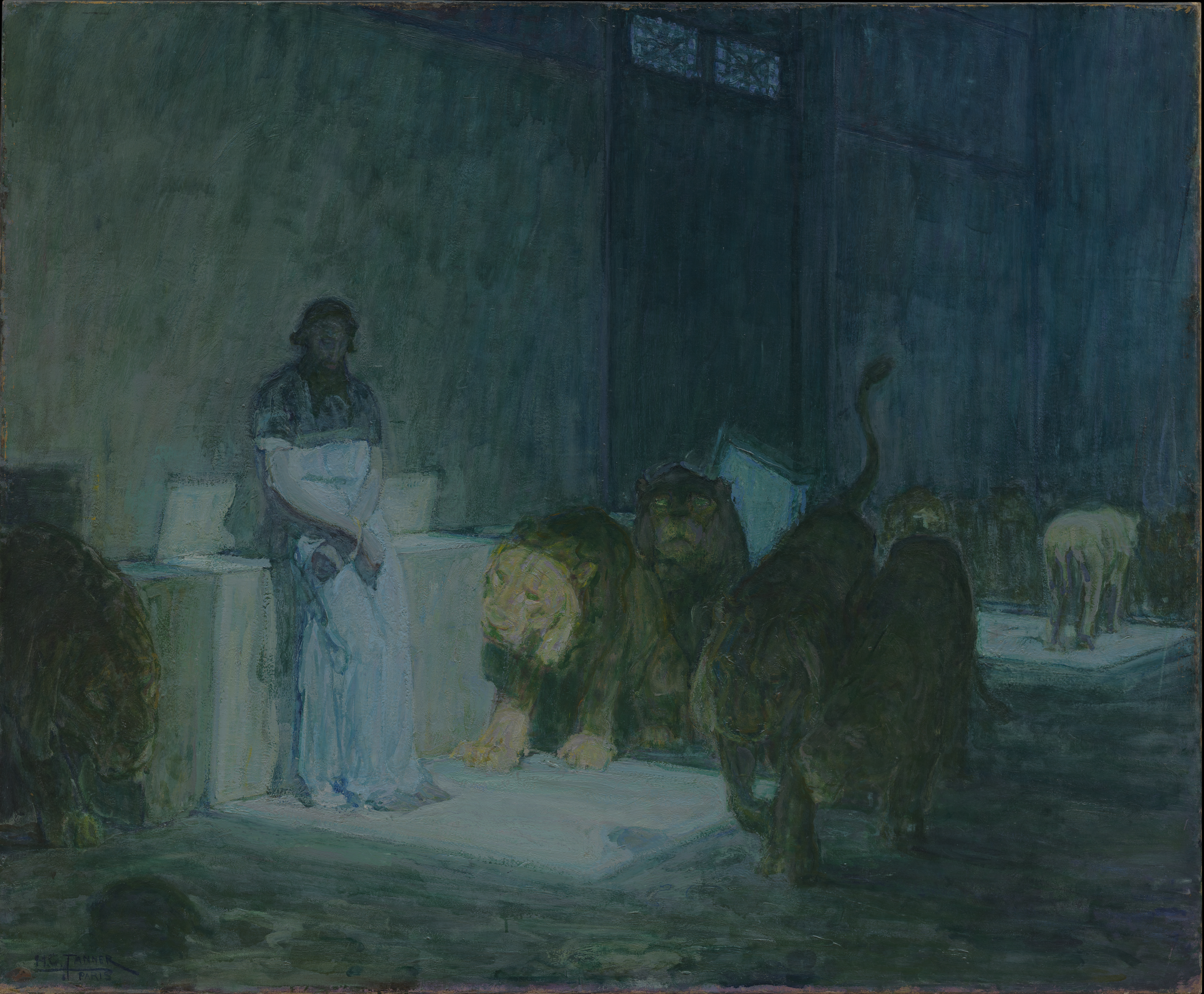
Daniel in the Lions' Den, by Henry Ossawa Tanner

The lion is the biblical emblem of the tribe of Judah and later the Kingdom of Judah. It is contained within Jacob's blessing to his fourth son in the penultimate chapter of the Book of Genesis, "Judah is a lion's whelp; On prey, my son have you grown. He crouches, lies down like a lion, like the king of beasts—who dare rouse him?" (Genesis 49:9).

The power and ferocity of the lion is invoked when describing the anger of God (Amos 3:4–8, Lam 3:10) and the menace of Israel's enemies (Psalm 17:12, Jer 2:30) and Satan (1 Pet 5:8). The book of Isaiah uses the imagery of a lion laying with a calf and child, and eating straw to portray the harmony of creation (Isa 11:6–7). In the Book of Revelation, a lion, an ox, a man and an eagle are seen on a heavenly throne in John's vision;(Rev 4:7).

In ancient Jewish art, lions often served as symbolic decorative elements. They appear in various media, including sculpture and mosaics, with one typical arrangement placing them symmetrically on either side of a Torah shrine. In the modern state of Israel, the lion remains the symbol of the capital city of Jerusalem, emblazoned on both the flag and coat of arms of the city.

In Christian tradition, Mark the Evangelist, the author of the second gospel is symbolized by the lion of Saint Mark – a figure of courage and monarchy. It also represents Jesus' Resurrection (because lions were believed to sleep with open eyes, a comparison with Christ in the tomb), and Christ as king. Some Christian legends refer to Saint Mark as "Saint Mark the Lionhearted". Legends say that he was fed to the lions and the animals refused to attack or eat him. Instead the lions slept at his feet, while he petted them. When the Romans saw this, they released him, spooked by the sight.

Christian tradition has associated lions with Christ's resurrection. In the Christian text Physiologus, lion cubs are said to be born stillborn and the mothers cares for them until the father returns on the third day to breathe life into them.

=== Late antiquity mysticism ===
A lion-faced figurine is usually associated with the Mithraic mysteries. Without any known parallel in classical, Egyptian, or middle-eastern art, what this figure is meant to represent currently is unknown. Some have interpreted it to be a representation of Ahriman, of the aforementioned gnostic Demiurge, or of some similar malevolent, tyrannical entity, but it has also been interpreted as some sort of time or season deity, or even a more positive symbol of enlightenment and spiritual transcendence.

Reliefs and statues

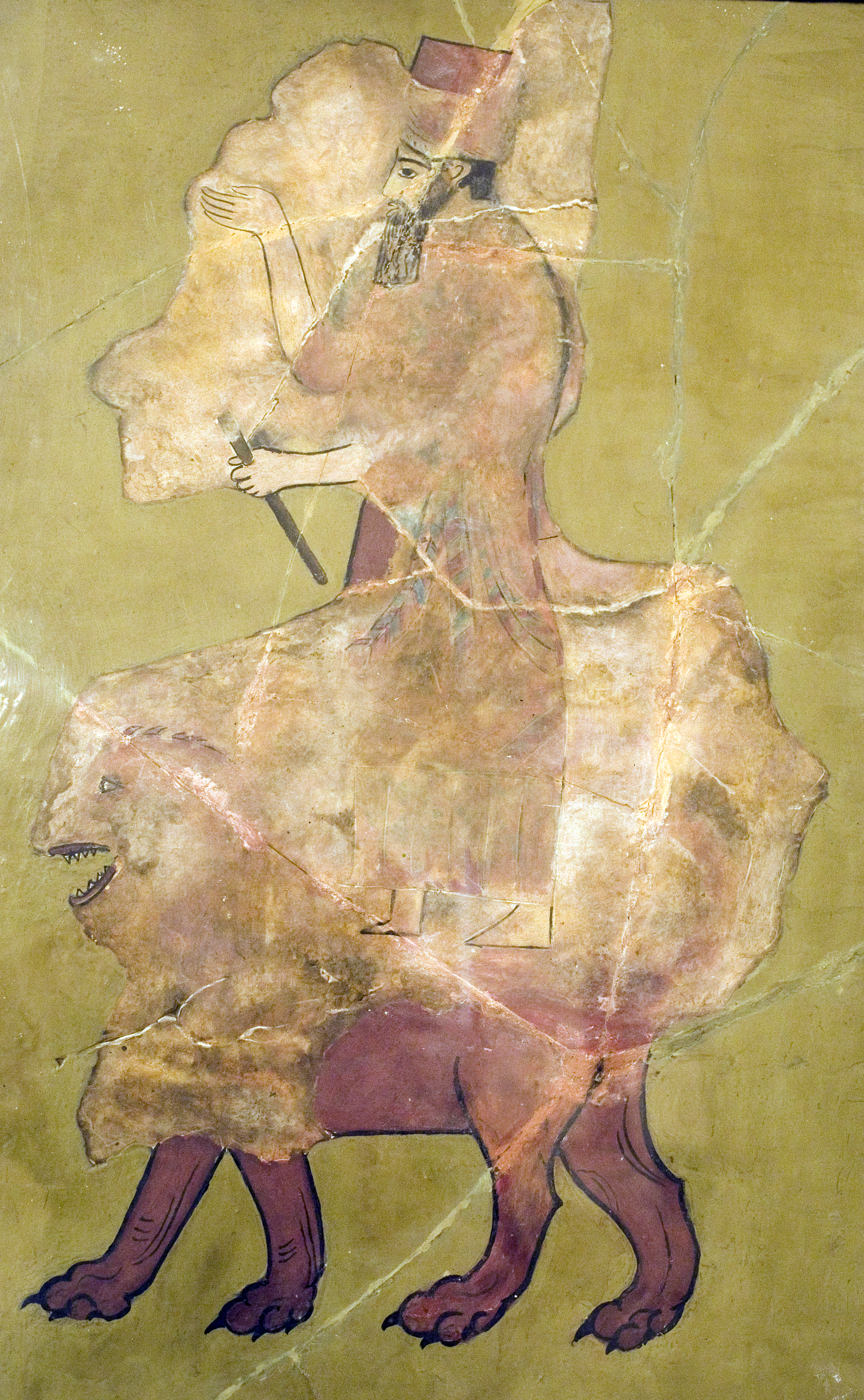
Portrait of Ḫaldi riding on lion at Erebuni Fortress

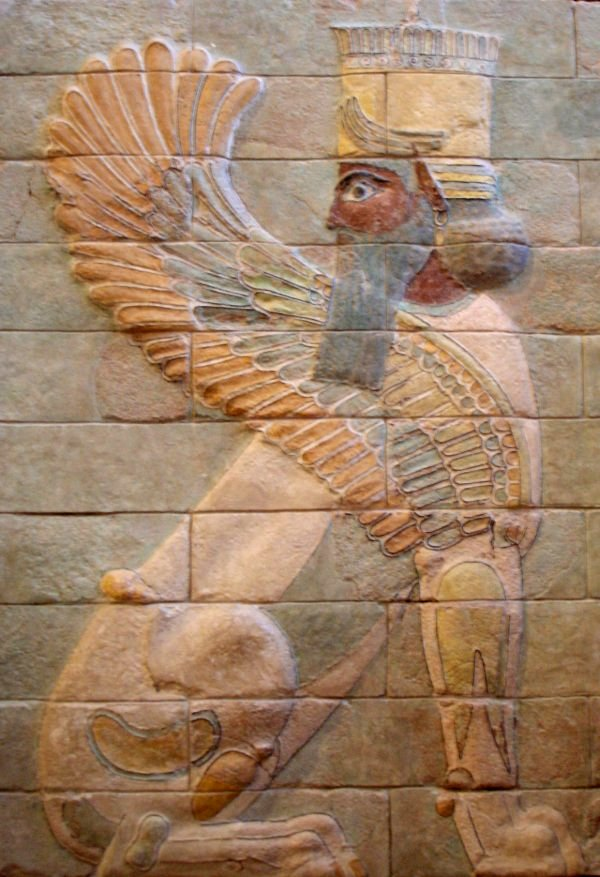
Winged sphinx with body of lioness, palace of Darius the Great at Susa

Samson and the lions, Saint Trophime Church Portal, 12th century

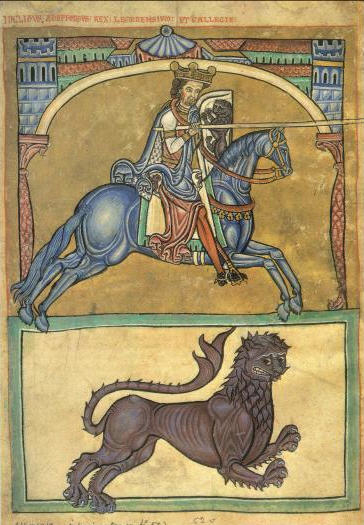
A lion at the side of King Alfonso IX of Leon, from the Tumbo A cartulary of the Cathedral of Santiago de Compostela

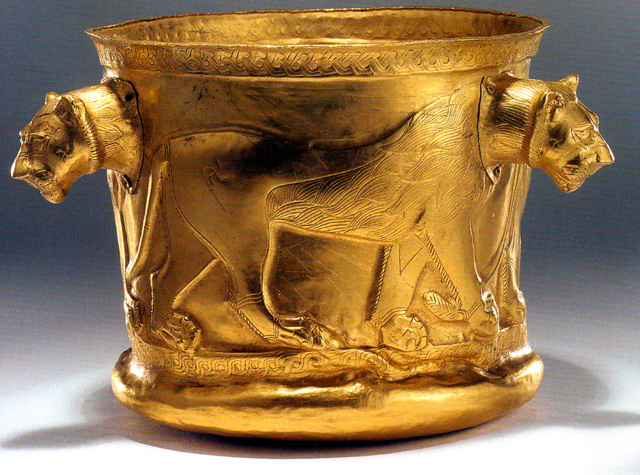
A Hyrcanian Achaemenid golden cup depicting lions, excavated at Kalardasht in Mazandaran, Iran

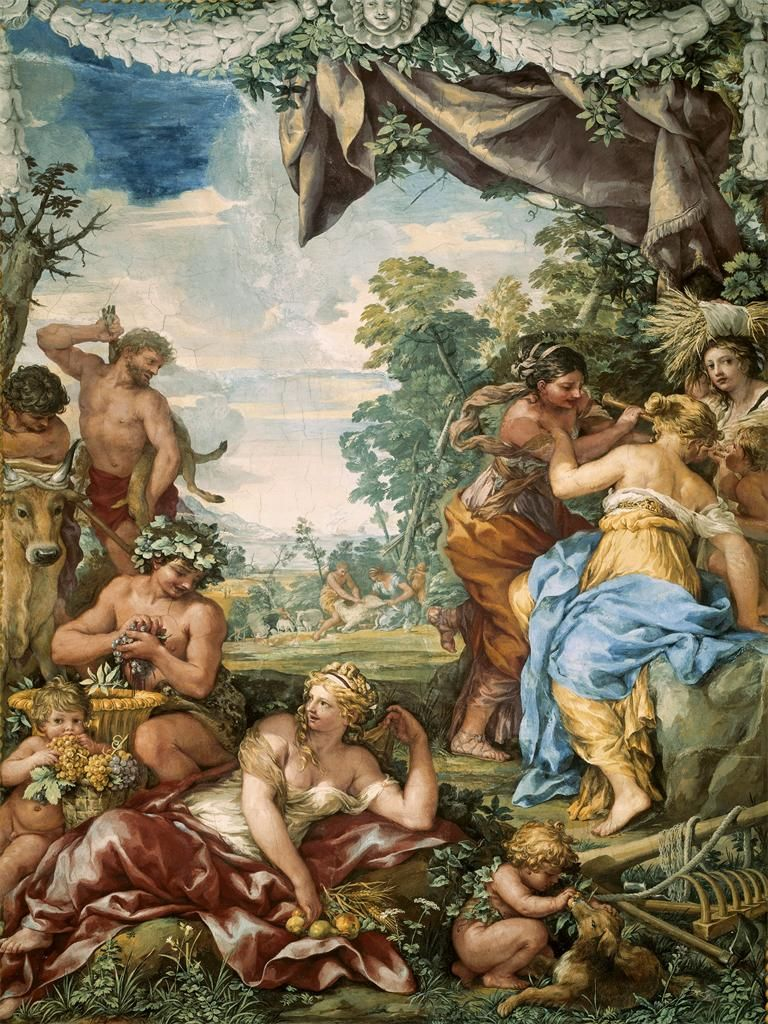
A lion in Pietro da Cortona's depiction of the Golden Age

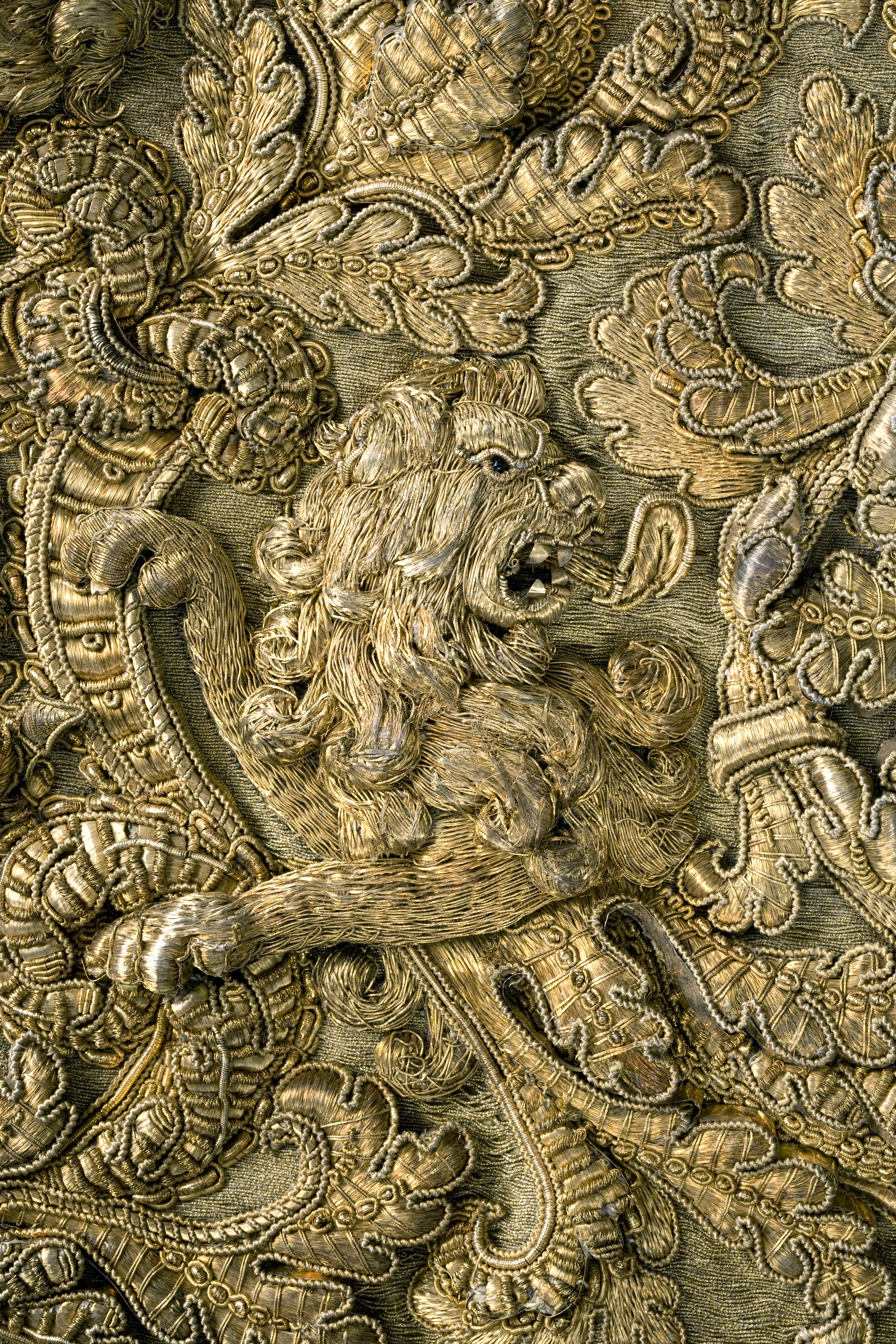
Embroidered lion on saddle pad of King Charles XI of Sweden, ca. 1670

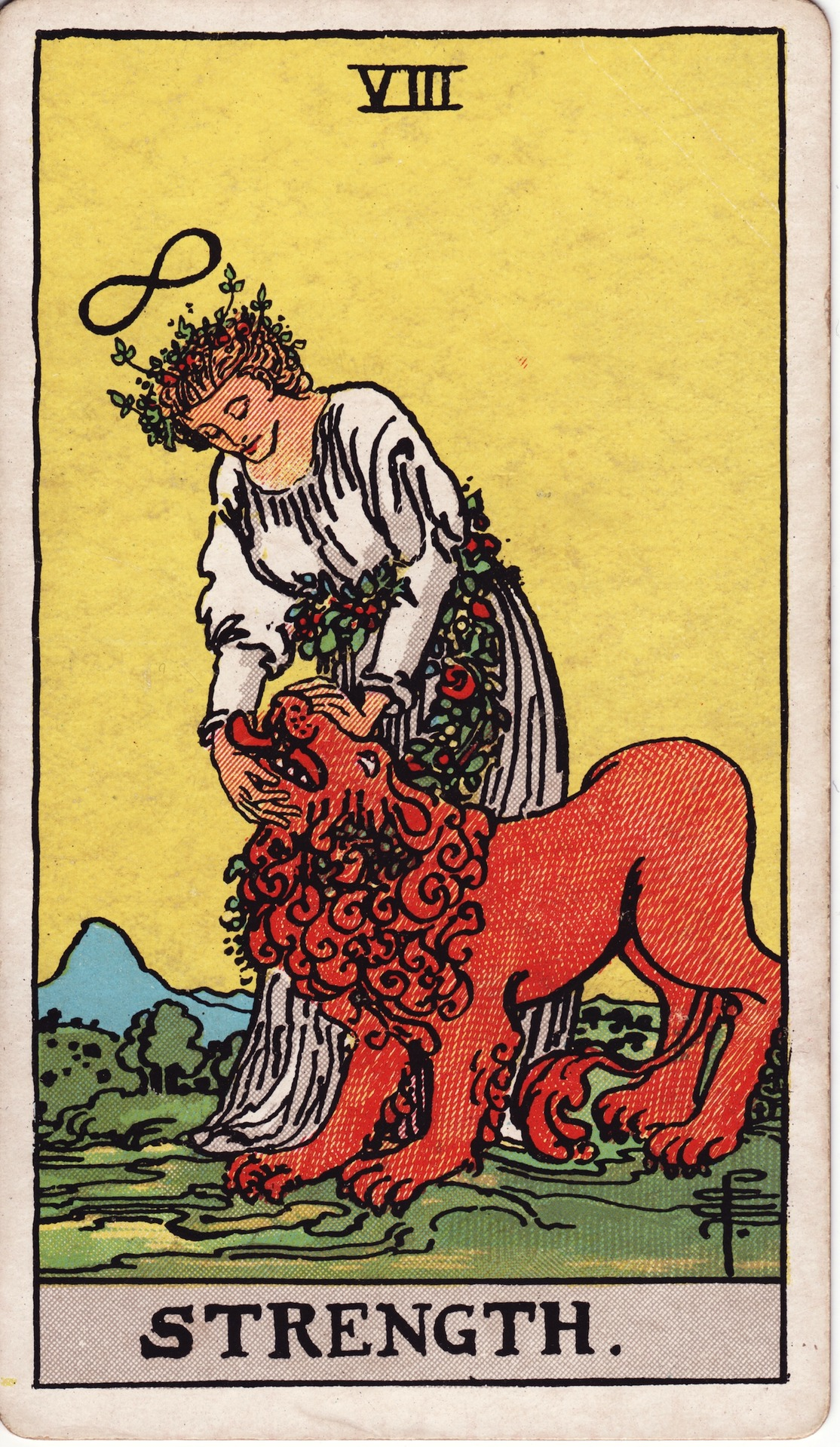
The "Strength" card of the Rider–Waite tarot deck

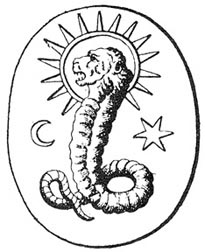
A Gnostic gem portraying a lion-faced deity

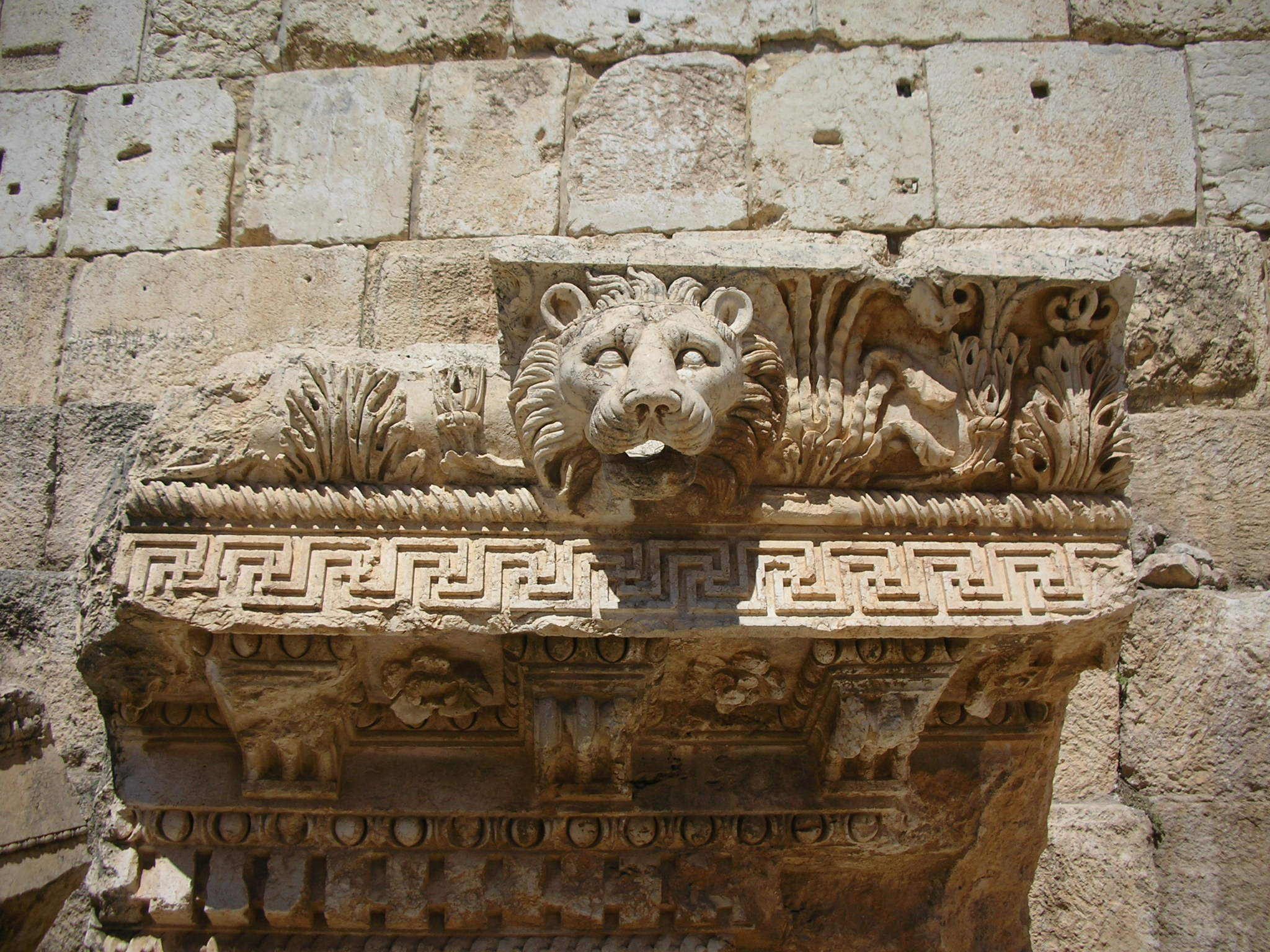
The lion head motif is a recurring architectural element in the great temple of Baalbek

=== Arthurian legend ===
In a key scene of Yvain, the Knight of the Lion (French: Yvain, le Chevalier au Lion), a romance by Chrétien de Troyes, the hero is depicted as rescuing a lion from a serpent. Subsequently, the lion proves to be a loyal companion and a symbol of knightly virtue, and helps Yvain complete his altruistic ventures. In the happy end, the lion comes to dwell with Yvain and his wife Laudine at their castle.

Sculptures of lions

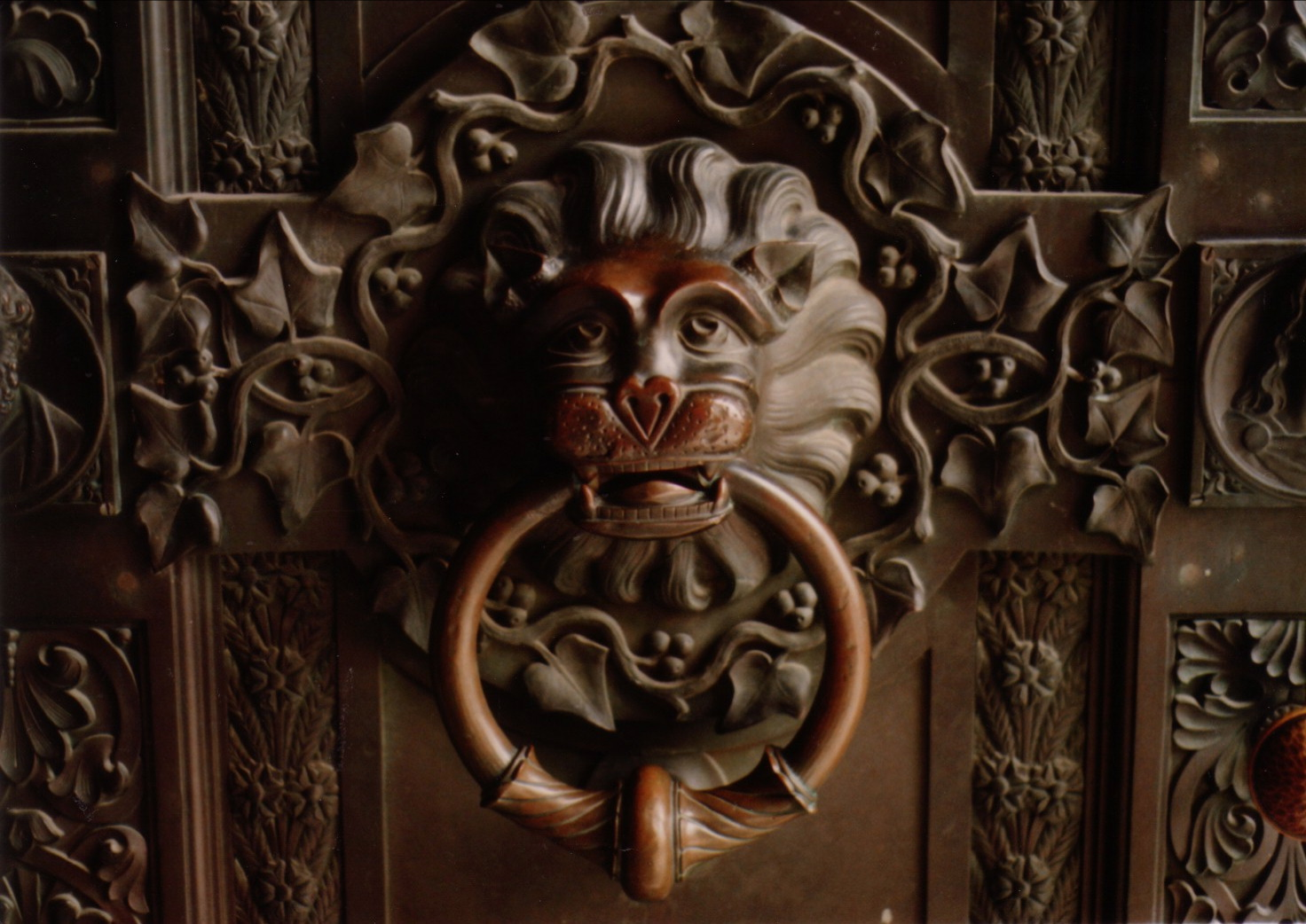
Lion door handle at Burg Hohenzollern

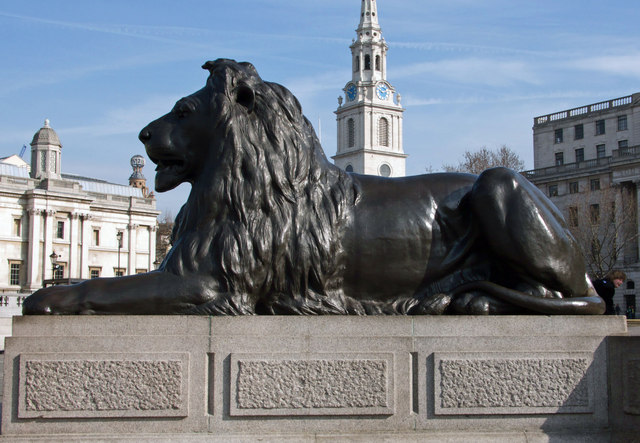
One of the four lions in Trafalgar Square, London, by Landseer at the base of Nelson's Column

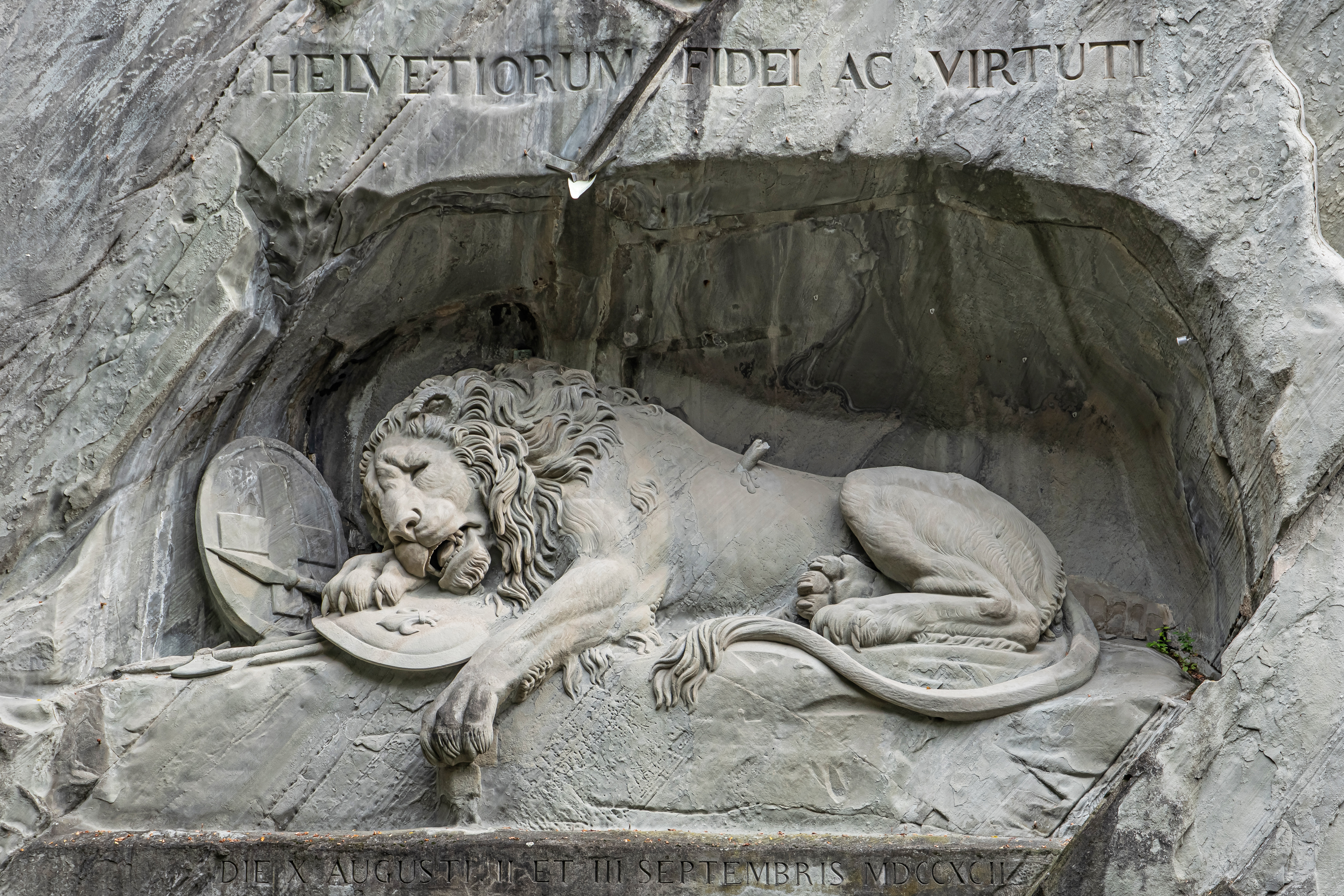
The Lion Monument in Lucerne, Switzerland, commemorates the sacrifice of the Swiss Guards at the Tuileries in 1792.

=== Islamic traditions ===
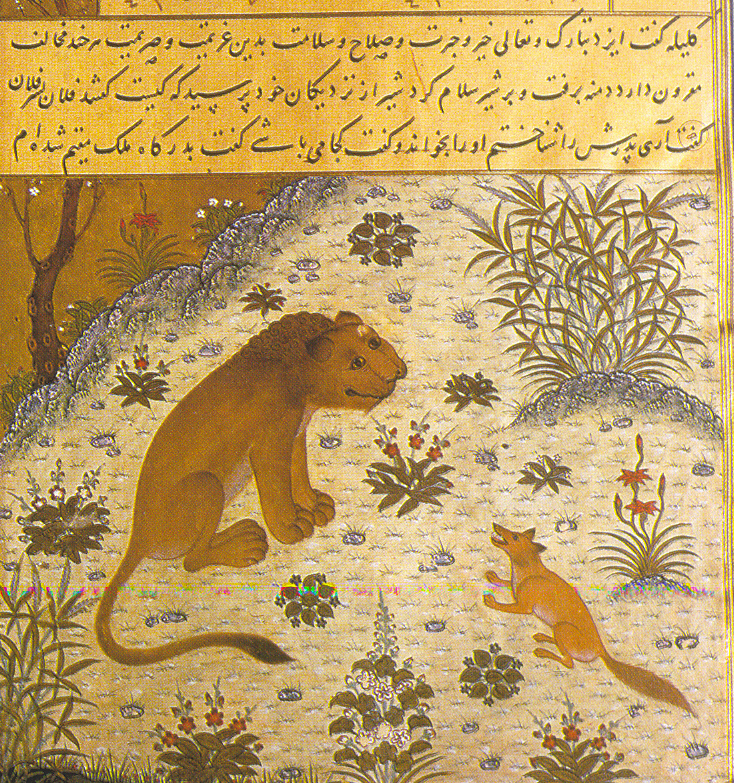
A page from Kelileh va Demneh dated 1429, from Herat, a Persian translation of the Panchatantra – depicts the manipulative jackal-vizier, trying to lead his lion-king into war

A popular zoomorphic Shia calligraphic motif, representing Ali as the Lion of Allah. The text reads: "By God! Ali ibn Abi Talib is the Victorious One! May the Almighty God be pleased with him, and may God give him glory!"

In both Arab and Persian culture, the lion is regarded as a symbol of courage, bravery, royalty and chivalry. The depiction of lions is derived from earlier Mesopotamian arts. Islamic art commonly manifests its aesthetic elements predominantly in Islamic calligraphy, floral and geometric decorative patterns, since Islamic religious tradition discourages the depictions of humans and living creatures in sculptures. Through Persian arts miniatures and paintings, however, the depictions of humans and animals survives. In al-Andalus (Muslim Spain), lion statues as supporters and waterspouts of fountains were built around 10th-century Cordoba, such as in the palaces of Madinat al-Zahra and Munyat an-Na'ura, as well as in the Maristan of Granada and in the Court of the Lions of the Alhambra in the 14th century. Animal motifs were also commonly used in stone-carved decoration in Anatolian Seljuk architecture (12th–13th centuries) and images of lions were favoured in this context. Examples include the lion reliefs on the Döner Kümbet tomb (c. 1275) and the lion-head carvings on the Sahabiye Madrasa (c. 1267), both in Kayseri, and two reliefs of a lion fighting a bull on the Great Mosque of Diyarbakir.

The epithet Asadullah ("Lion of Allah") is ascribed to two of the Prophet Muhammad's closest companions - Hamza and Ali, both for their prowess and valour. Because of its association with Ali, the epithet holds particular relevance in Shia Islam. This has been especially the case since the Safavid conversion of Iran to Shia Islam, after which the Lion and Sun became not just a symbol of Persia or its monarchy, but also their particular association with Shia Islam. However, with its revival by Safavids, the Lion and Sun became a popular motif throughout Persianate cultures, not just among Shias. For example, the motif was also used by the Mughal Empire.

=== Dharmic traditions ===
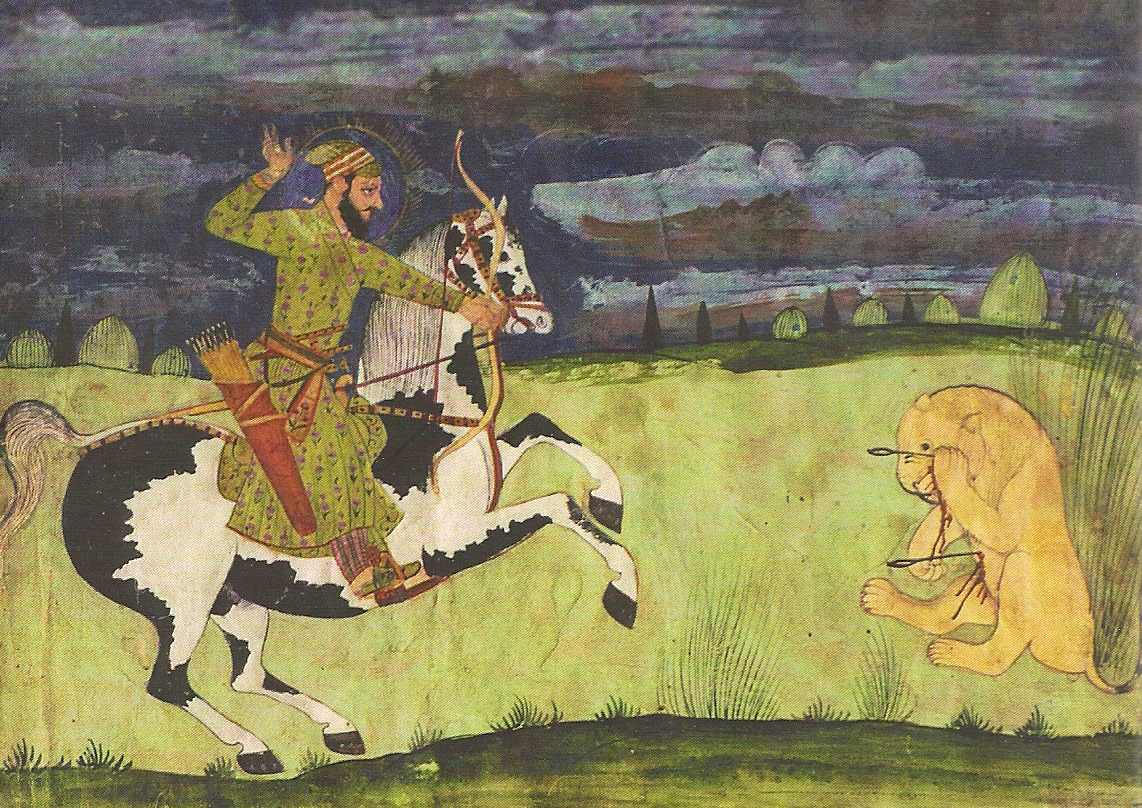
Sikh contemporary or near-contemporary art depiction of Guru Gobind Singh hunting Asiatic lion

The lion symbolism and its cultural depictions can be found in Hindu and Buddhist art of India and Southeast Asia. The lion symbolism in India was based upon Asiatic lions that once spread in Indian subcontinent as far as the Middle East.

==== South Asia ====
Neolithic cave paintings of lions were found in Bhimbetka rock shelters in central India, which are at least 30,000 years old.

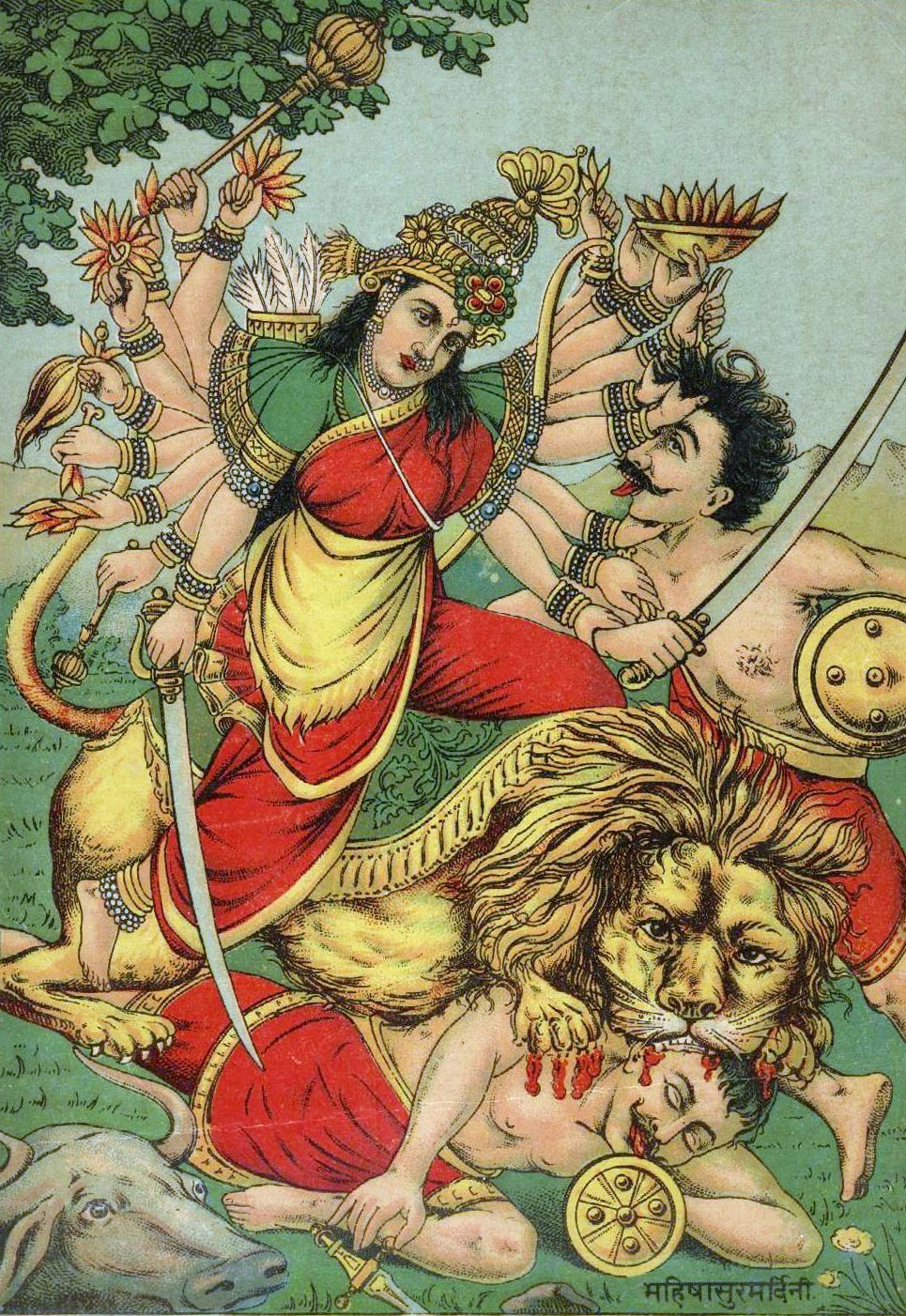
Hindu Goddess Durga has a lion as her vahanam or divine mount

Narasimha ("man-lion") is described as the fourth incarnation (avatara) of the Hindu deity Vishnu in the Puranic texts of Hinduism, an anthropomorphic form assumed to slay a daitya (demon) named Hiranyakashipu. A goddess corresponding to the appearance of Narasimha is also featured, called Narasimhi.

Lions are also found in Buddhist symbolism. Lion pillars erected during the reign of Emperor Ashoka show lions and the chakra emblem. The lions depicted in the Lion Capital of Ashoka inspired artists who designed the Emblem of India.

Singh is an ancient Indian name meaning "lion", dating more than 2,000 years ago to ancient India. It was originally only used by warriors in India. After the birth of the Khalsa brotherhood in 1699, the Sikhs also adopted the name "Singh" due to the wishes of Guru Gobind Singh. Singh is used by various communities today, it is also used by more than 20 million Sikhs worldwide. The appellation of the name Singh was used by the Rajputs before being adopted by the Sikhs in 1699. Therefore, all "Singh"s in Indian history before 1699 are Hindu and mainly Rajputs. The lion also features as the carrier or the vehicle of Durga, the Hindu goddess of war, worshipped throughout India

The lion is symbolic for the Sinhalese, Sri Lanka's ethnic majority; the term derived from the Indo-Aryan Sinhala, meaning the "lion people" or "people with lion blood", while a sword-wielding lion is the central figure on the modern national flag of Sri Lanka. The entrance to Sigiriya, the Lion-Rock of Sri Lanka, was through the Lion Gate, the mouth of a stone lion. The paws of the lion is one of seven World Heritage Sites in Sri Lanka.

==== Southeast Asia ====
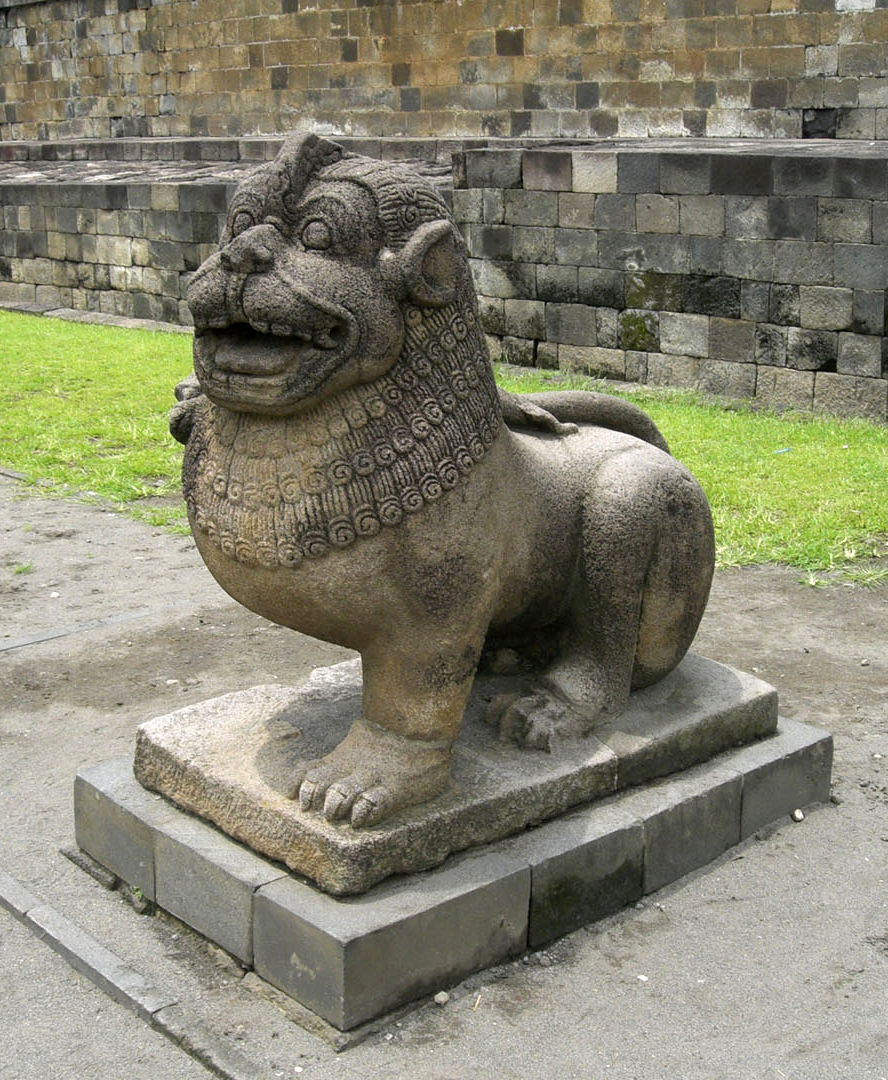
Lion guardian of Borobudur

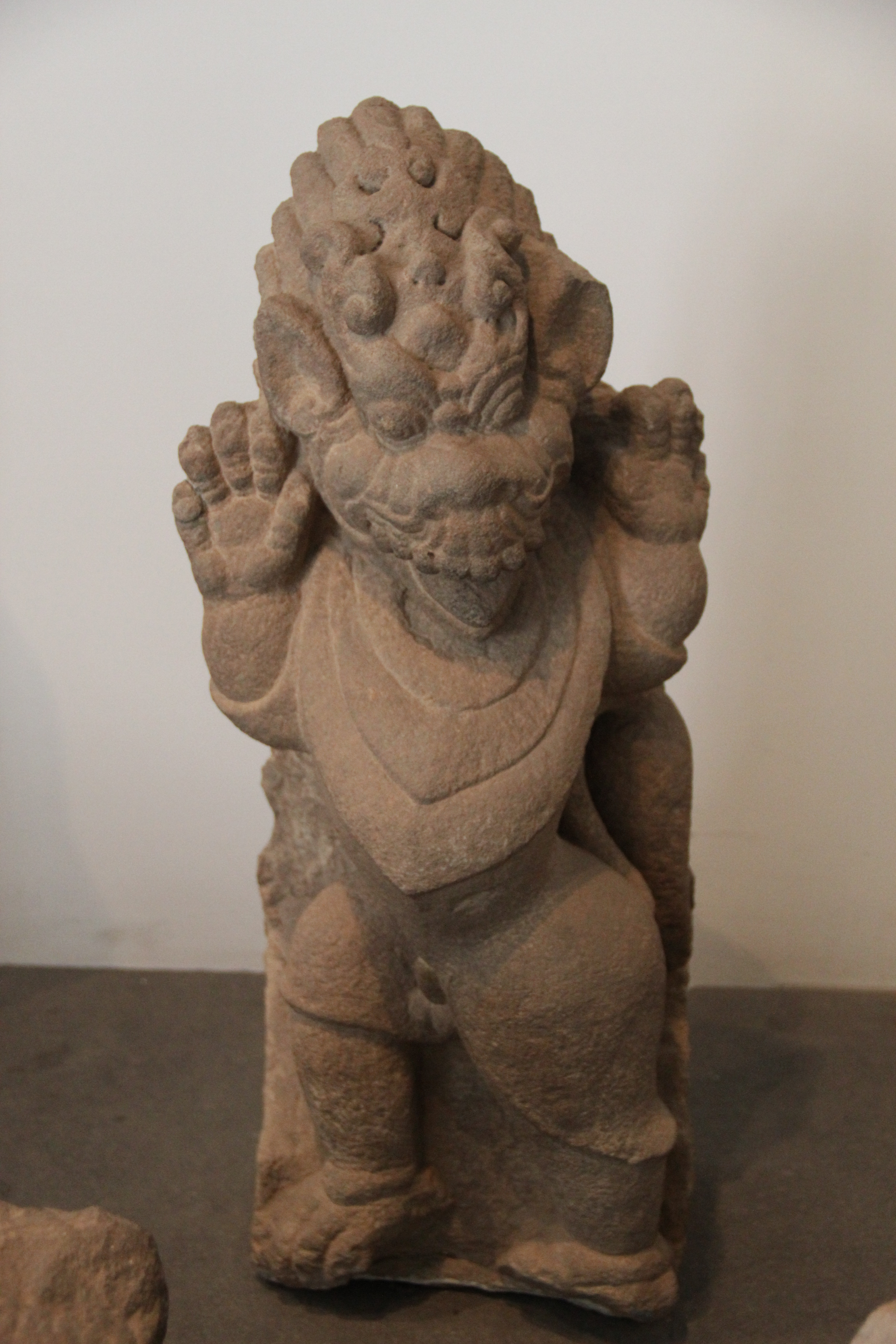
Lion sculpture from Tra Kieu, Champa, 6th–8th century AD

Lions were never native animals of Southeast Asia in recorded history. As the result, the depiction of lion in ancient Southeast Asian art, especially in ancient Java and Cambodia, is far from naturalistic style as depicted in Greek or Persian art counterparts, since the artist who carved the lion sculpture never saw the lion before, and all were based on perception and imagination. The cultural depictions and the reverence of lion as the noble and powerful beast in Southeast Asia was influenced by Indian culture.

Statues of a pair of lions are often found in temples in Southeast Asia as the gate guardian. In the Borobudur Buddhist monument Central Java, Indonesia andesite stone statues of lions guarding four main entrances of Borobudur. The thrones of Buddha and Boddhisattva found in Kalasan and Mendut buddhist temples of ancient Java depicted elephant, lion, and makara. The statue of a winged lion also is found in Penataran temple East Java, as well as in Balinese temples. The Balinese winged lion often served as the guardian statue or as the pedestal of wooden column.

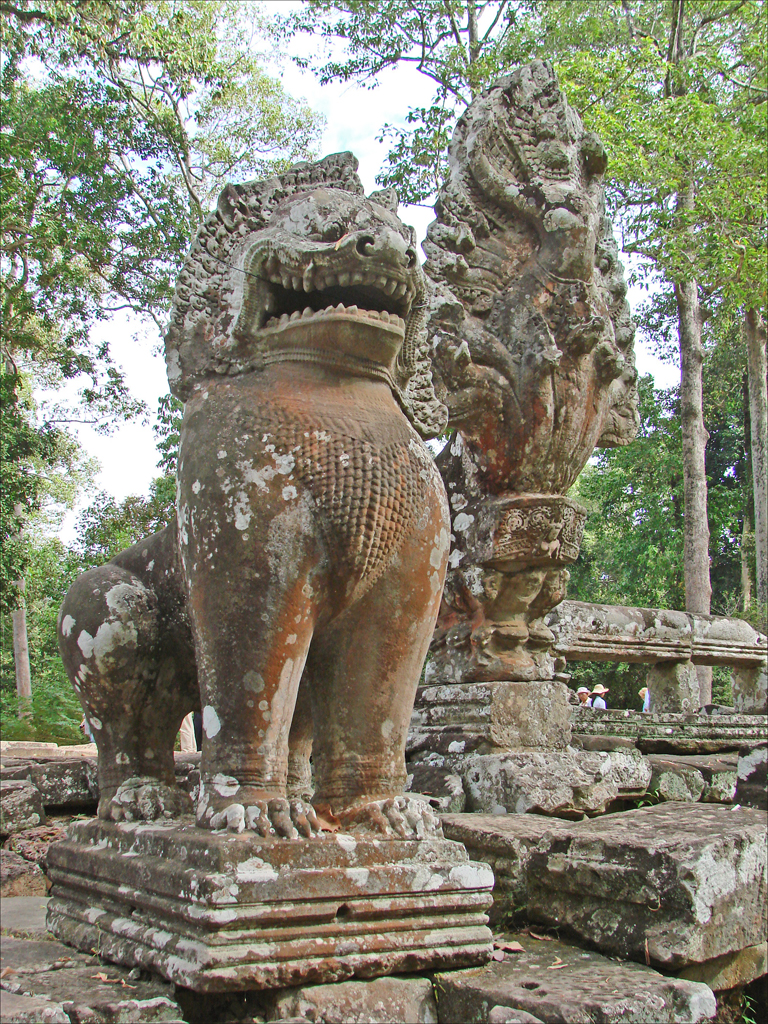
Lion guardian of Bayon, Angkor

In Cambodia statues of lions flanking the temple gate or access roads are commonly found in temples of Angkor. Bakong, a stepped pyramid Hindu temple from earlier period also displays lion statues as guardians of each stage on each of the cardinal points. Khmer lion guardian statues are commonly found in Angkor Wat, Bayon, Pre Rup and Srah Srang. Just like ancient Java, the depiction of lion in ancient Khmer art is not in naturalistic style, more like a symbolic mythical animal derived from Indian Hindu-Buddhist art. The royal emblem of Cambodia depicting a pair of guardian animals; gajasingha (hybrid of elephant and lion) and singha (lion). In Thailand, a pair of lion statues are often placed in front of temple gate as guardian. The style of Thai lion is similar to those of Cambodian, since Thailand derived many of its aesthetics and arts elements from Cambodian Khmer art.

In Myanmar, the statue of lion called Chinthe guarding the stupas, pagodas, and Buddhist temples in Bagan, while pair of lions are also featured in the country's coat-of-arms.

The island nation of Singapore (Singapura) derives its name from the Malay words singa (lion) and pura (city), which in turn is from the Tamil-Sanskrit சிங்க singa सिंह siṃha and पुर புர pura. According to the Malay Annals, this name was given by a fourteenth-century Sumatran Malay prince named Sang Nila Utama, who, on alighting the island after a thunderstorm, spotted an auspicious beast on shore that his chief minister identified as a lion (Asiatic lion). Recent studies of Singapore indicate that lions have never lived there.

In the modern era, the lion or Merlion became the icon of Singapore due to the island's name. The Merlion also figures heavily in the official symbols of the Philippines as it was once an overseas possession of Spain; it appears on the coat-of-arms of Manila, as well as the emblems of the president, vice-president, and its navy.

==== China and Tibet ====
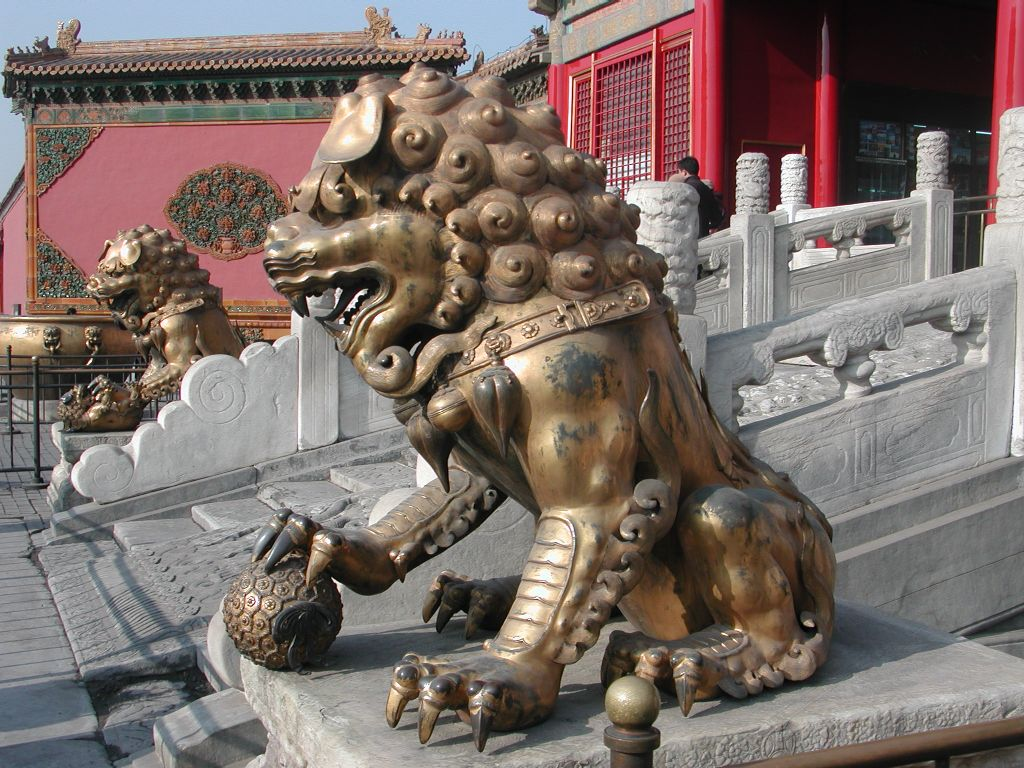
A Qing-era guardian lion pair within the Forbidden City, China

The common motif of the "majestic and powerful" lion was introduced to China by Buddhist missionaries from India, somewhere in the first century AD. Lions themselves, however, are not native to China, yet appear in the art of China and the Chinese people believe that lions protect humans from evil spirits, hence the Chinese New Year lion dance to scare away demons and ghosts. Chinese guardian lions are frequently used in sculpture in traditional Chinese architecture. For instance, in the Forbidden City in Beijing, two lion statues are seen in almost every door entrance.

Lions feature prominently in the Tibetan culture with a pair of Snow Lions seen on the Tibetan flag. The Snow Lions are mythical creatures that are seen as protector entities. The Snow Lion symbolizes fearlessness, unconditional cheerfulness, east, and the Earth element. It is one of the Four Dignities. It ranges over the mountains, and is commonly pictured as being white with a turquoise mane.

==== Japan ====
The lion became popular in Japanese art from the 14th century onwards, under Chinese influence. The Chinese artistic form of the "dog-lion" (kara-shishi in Japanese) was almost always used, but was generally somewhat fatter, and with a shorter torso, than in China, with a short fan-like tail and a flattened face. Hokusai had a "special cult of the Chinese lion, whose "spiritual form" he drew each morning".

Lions (獅子, shishi) feature prominently in many kabuki plays and other forms of Japanese legend and traditional tales.

== In narration ==
The lion appears in several fairy and folk tale traditions all over the world. Some tale types, according to the Aarne-Thompson-Uther Index, show it as the hero's helper or a protagonist on its own right:

- Aarne-Thompson-Uther type number 156, "Androcles and the Lion": a slave helps a lion by removing a thorn from its paw. Later, when the slave is put in a perilous situation against the very same lion, the lion recognizes him and spares his life in gratitude.
- Aarne-Thompson-Uther type number 300, "The Dragon-Slayer": in some variants, a lion appears as part of the hero's animal entourage to defeat a vicious dragon and rescue the princess.
- Aarne-Thompson-Uther type number 303, "The Twins or Blood-Brothers": this tale type sometimes merges with the previous one. Twins (or triplets) or lookalike individuals acquire two sets of fierce animals, like bears, lions and wolves. Each goes their separate ways: one defeats the dragon and the other meets a witch who petrifies his twin. Example: The Three Princes and their Beasts, Lithuanian fairy tale; The Two Brothers, German fairy tale by the Brothers Grimm.
- Aarne-Thompson-Uther type number 425, "The Search for the Lost Husband", and Aarne-Thompson-Uther type number 425A, "Animal as Bridegroom": a maiden is betrothed to an animal bridegroom (a lion, in several variants), who comes at night to the bridal bed in human form. The maiden breaks a taboo and her enchanted husband disappears. She is forced to seek him. Example: The Singing, Springing Lark, a German fairy tale by the Brothers Grimm; La fiancée du lion ("The Lion's Bride"), Breton folktale collected by Paul Sébillot.
- Aarne-Thompson-Uther type number 552, "The Girls who married Animals": a bankrupt nobleman or a poor farmer is forced to wed his daughters to three animal suitors, who are actually enchanted princes under a curse. In some variants, one of the suitors is a lion. Example: The Three Enchanted Princes.
- Aarne-Thompson-Uther type number 590, "The Faithless Mother" or "The Prince and the Arm Bands": a boy with his mother finds a magic belt (magic arm bands) that grants strength. Later, his mother conspires with her new paramour (giant or ogre) to kill her son. Two lions end up helping the youth. Example: The Blue Belt, Norwegian fairy tale.

The lion also appears as a king's councillor in the German fairy tale The Twelve Huntsmen.

The lion also appears as an obstacle in the hero's dangerous quest, such as a guardian of the water of life, of a garden or of a princess.

== Title of kings and political leaders ==
Various kings and political leaders in different cultures and times, famed for courage or fierceness, were entitled "the lion" – such as:

- Llywelyn the Great, along with his family, were known to bear lions on their arms
- Henry the Lion of Saxony
- Richard the Lionheart, first used a single lion, then the three-lion bearing that became the arms of the Plantagenet dynasty.
- Robert III, "The Lion of Flanders"
- Lala Lajpat Rai, "The Lion of Punjab"
- Omar Mukhtar was called Asad aṣ-Ṣaḥrā' (Arabic: أَسَـد الـصَّـحْـرَاء, "Lion of the Desert").
- Sundiata Keita the "Lion of Mali".
- The Al-Assad family, formerly ruling in Syria, derives its surname from the title Asad ("lion" in Arabic) of an ancestor
- Fourteen popes took the name Leo
- Maharaja Ranjit Singh, "Lion of the Punjab"

== In fine art ==
During the Renaissance, animals, especially those close to man, were depicted with passion but also with scientific rigor. However, exotic animals, which were difficult to observe, were in part imagined by the painter: La Chaste au tigre (The Tiger Hunt), a Baroque painting by Rubens depicting a hunt for big cats, including lions, is a work that was partly imagined by the painter; the composition of the picture, however, allowed realism to be breathed into these invented felines. For Théophile Gautier, it was essentially "lions with wigs" that were produced during Classicism.

The Romantic painter worked as much on anatomical accuracy, notably by practicing the representation of real subjects held in zoos, as on the desire to depict a sentimental animal, which drew the ridicule of classical-style artists. Lion and tiger enjoy renewed interest. The Romantic period was marked by a number of great paintings, such as Eugène Delacroix's lions.

In the 19th century, numerous zoological illustrations by naturalists show the lion in particular. From the same period onwards, humorous and often irreverent depictions of the "king of animals" proliferated, particularly in political cartoons and comics.

=== Paintings ===
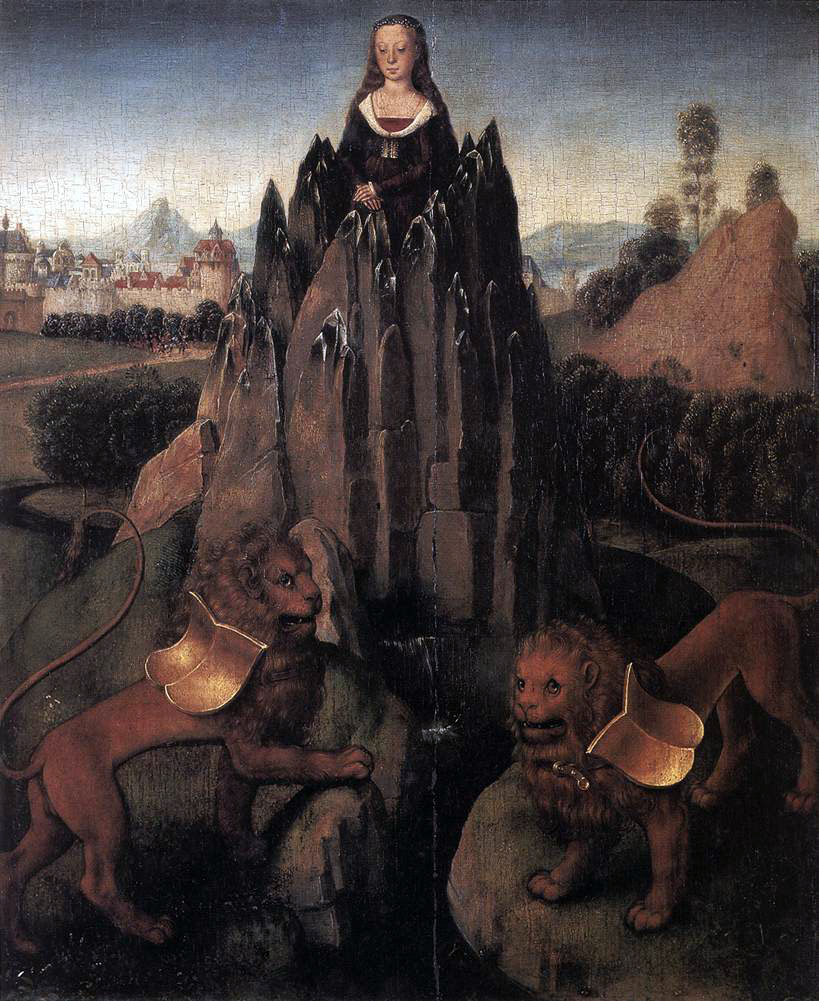
Allegory with a Virgin, 1479–80 by Hans Memling

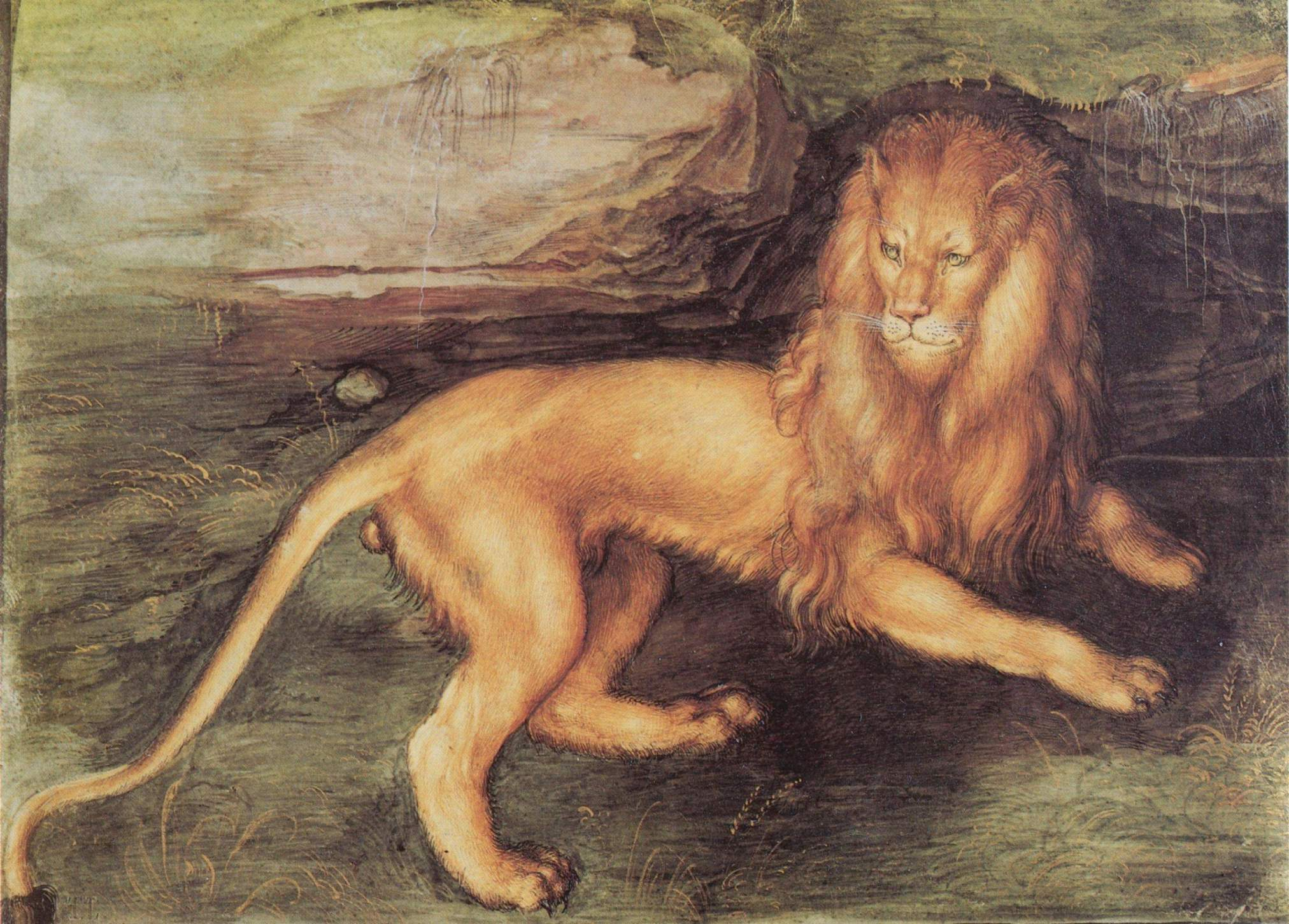
Löwe by Albrecht Dürer, 1494

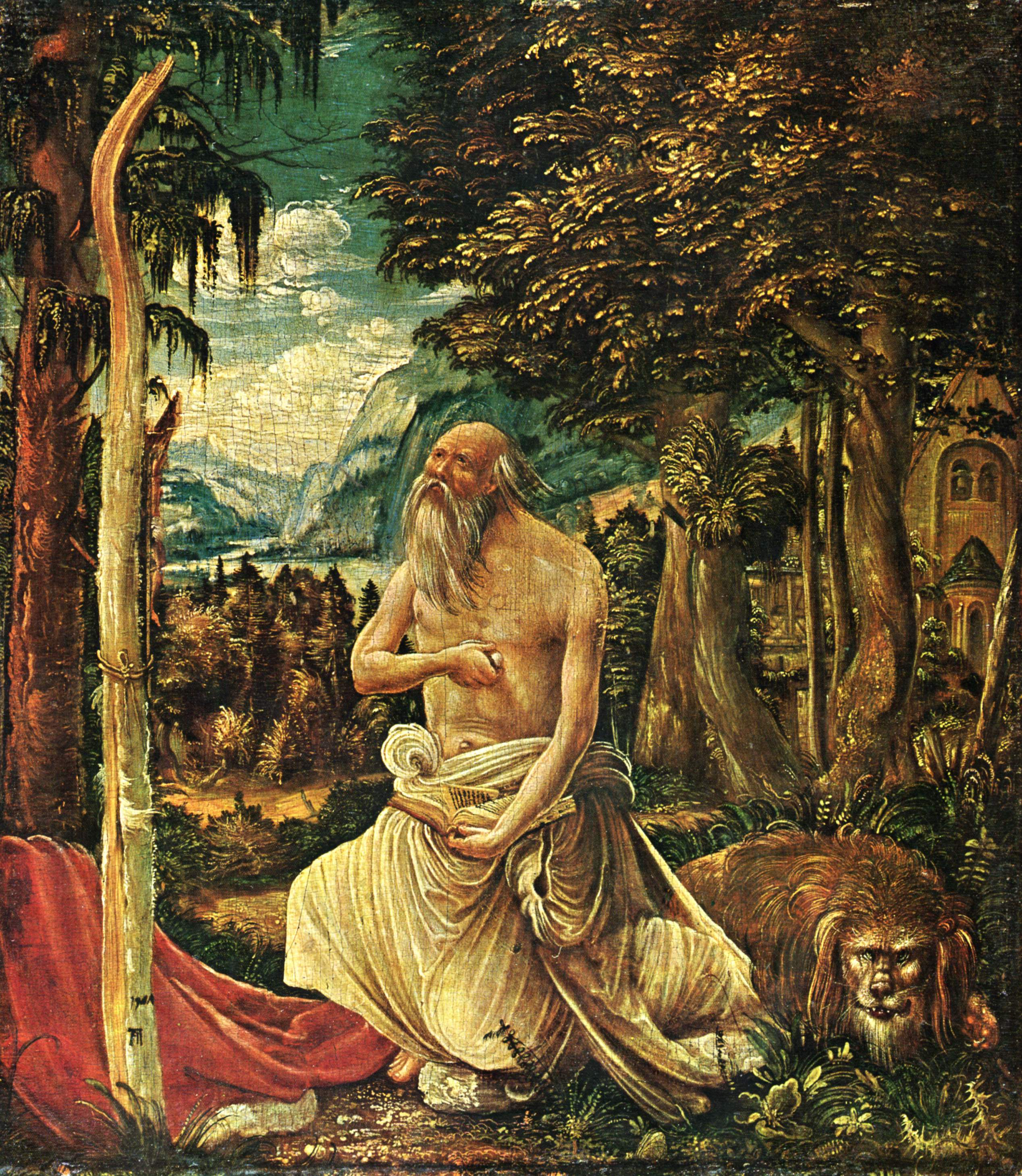
Hieronymus and the Lion, 1507 by Albrecht Altdorfer

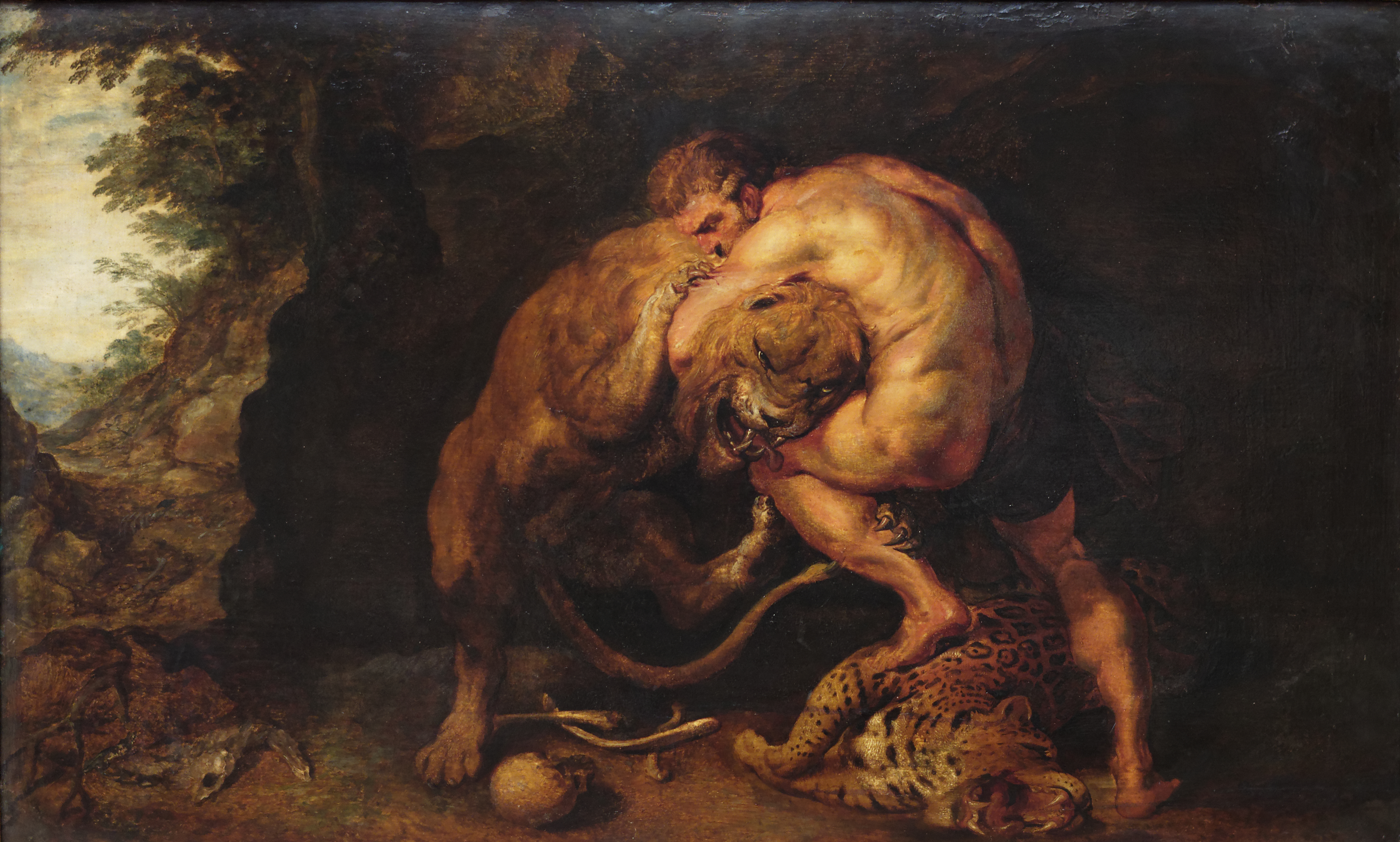
Hercules fight with the Nemeean lion by Pieter Paul Rubens

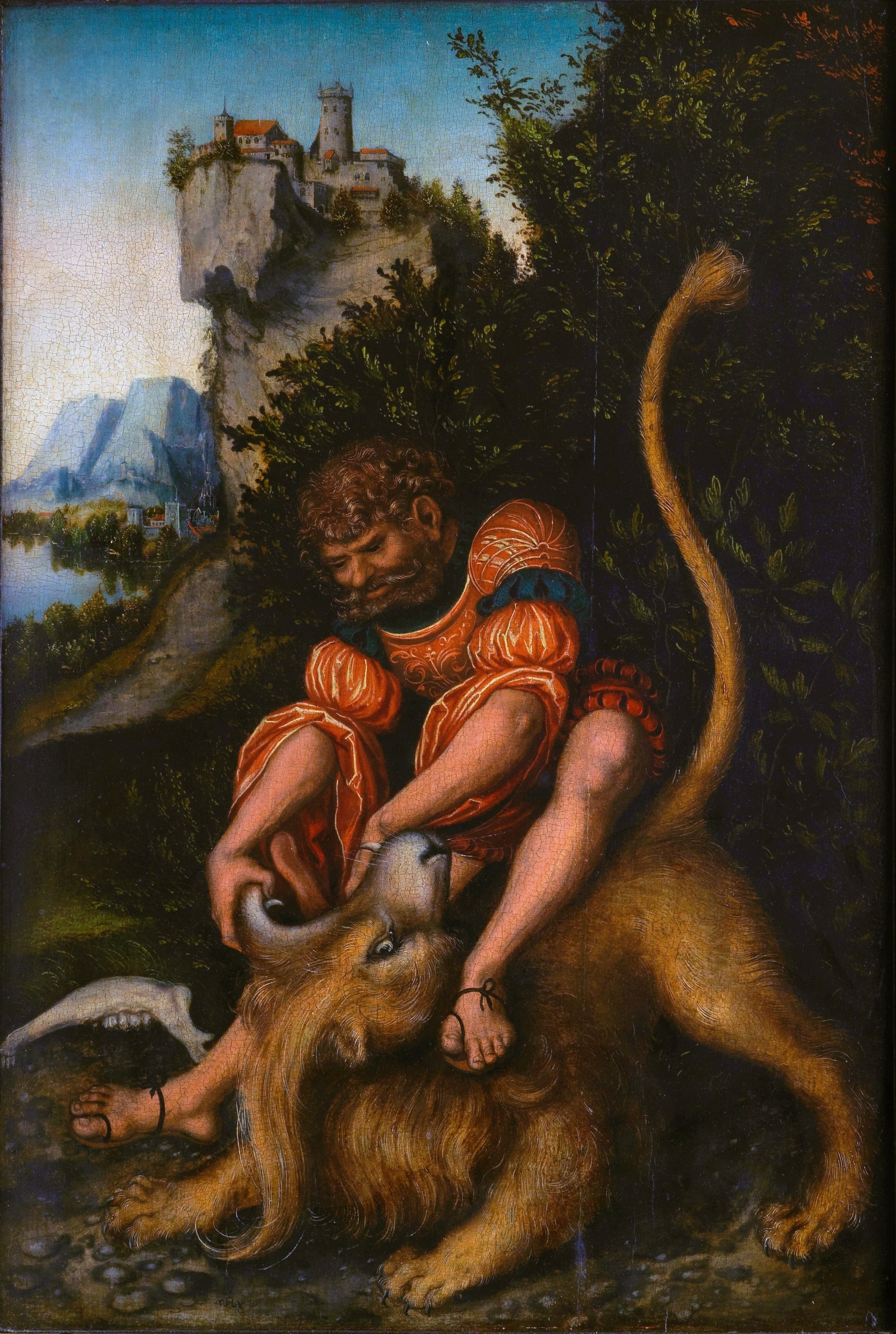
Samson's Fight with the Lion, by Lucas Cranach the Elder, 1525

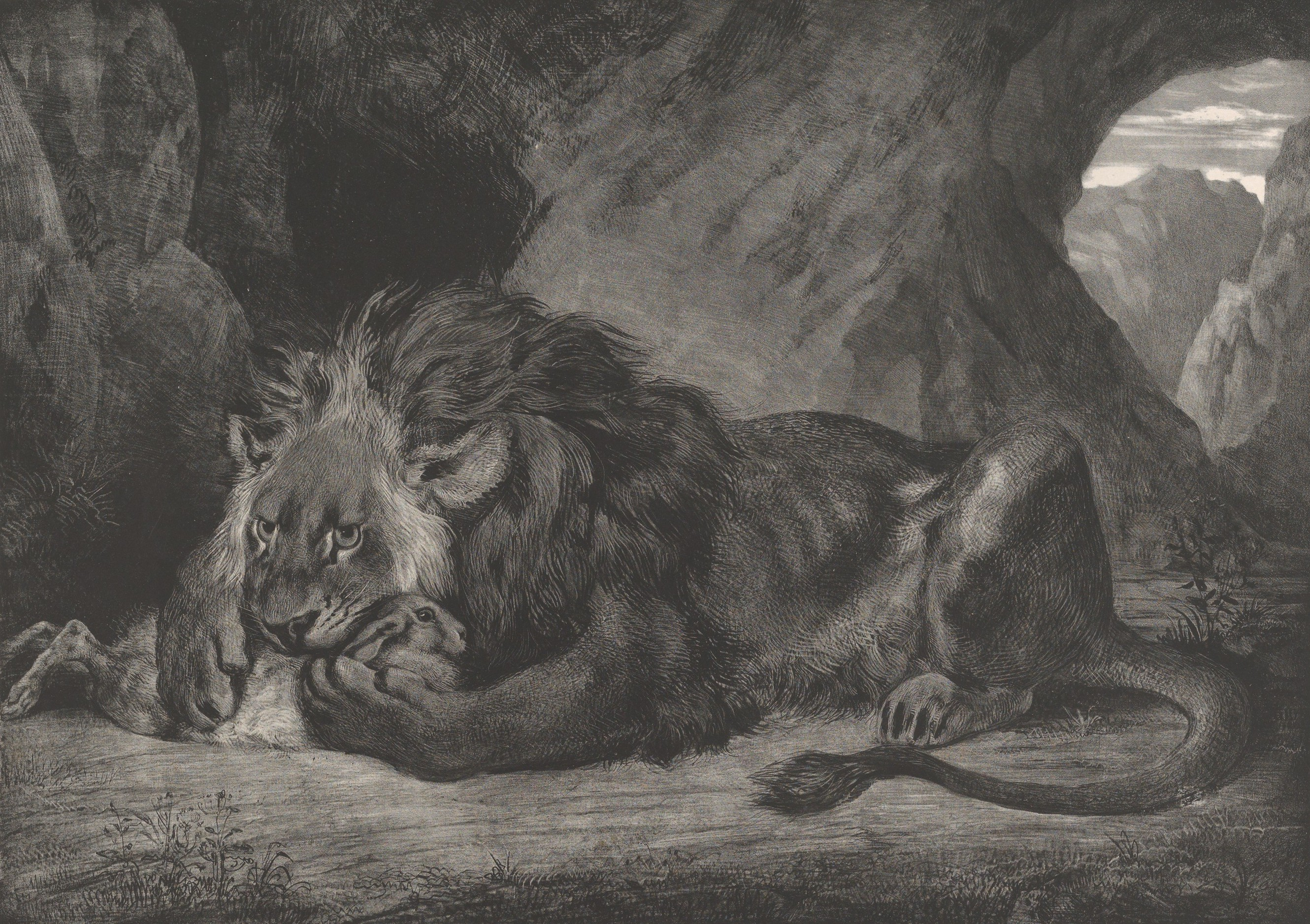
Lion of the Atlas (French: Lion de l'Atlas) by Eugène Delacroix, 1829, in the Saint Louis Art Museum

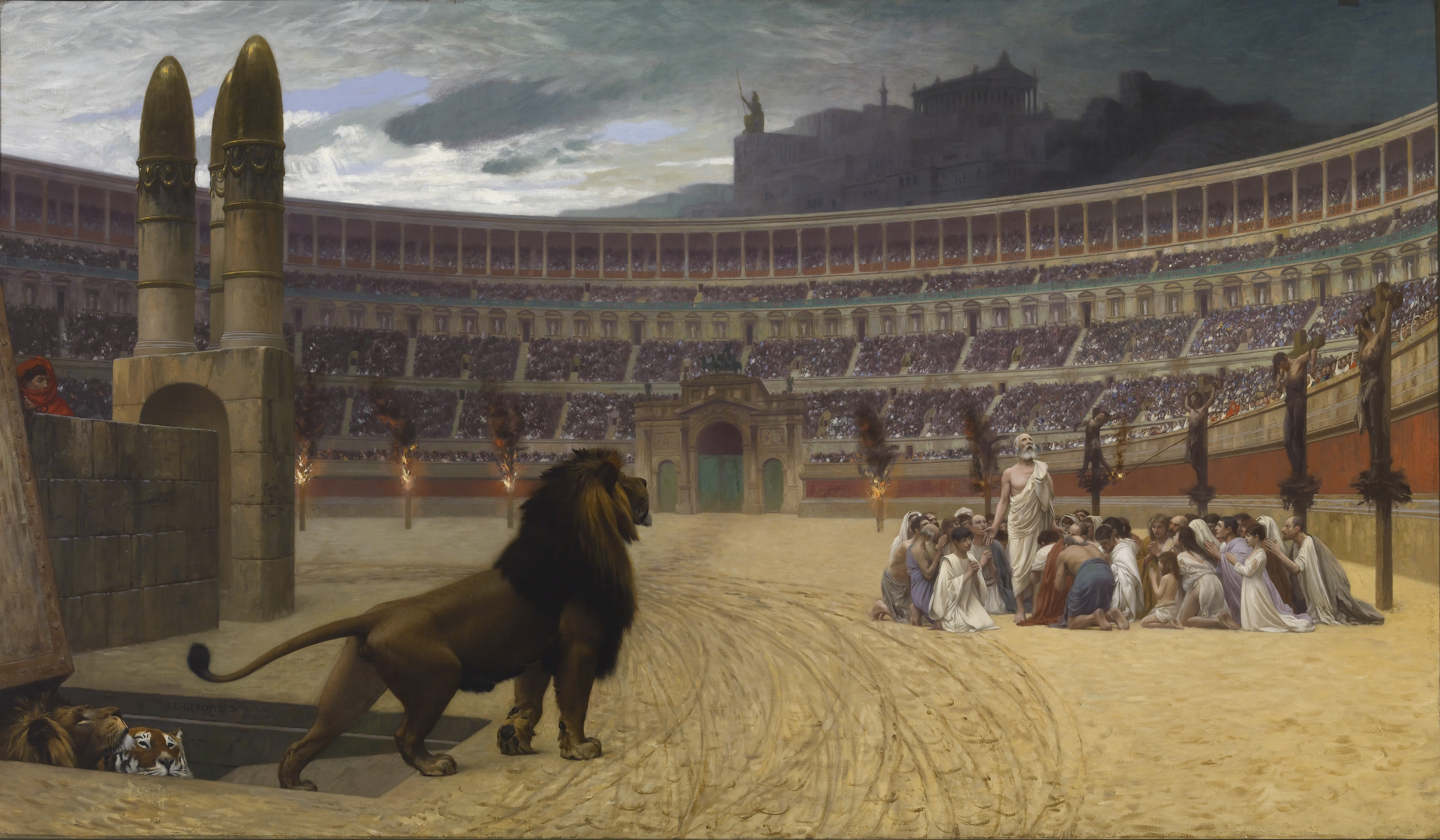
The Christian Martyrs' Last Prayer by Jean-Léon Gérôme, 1863

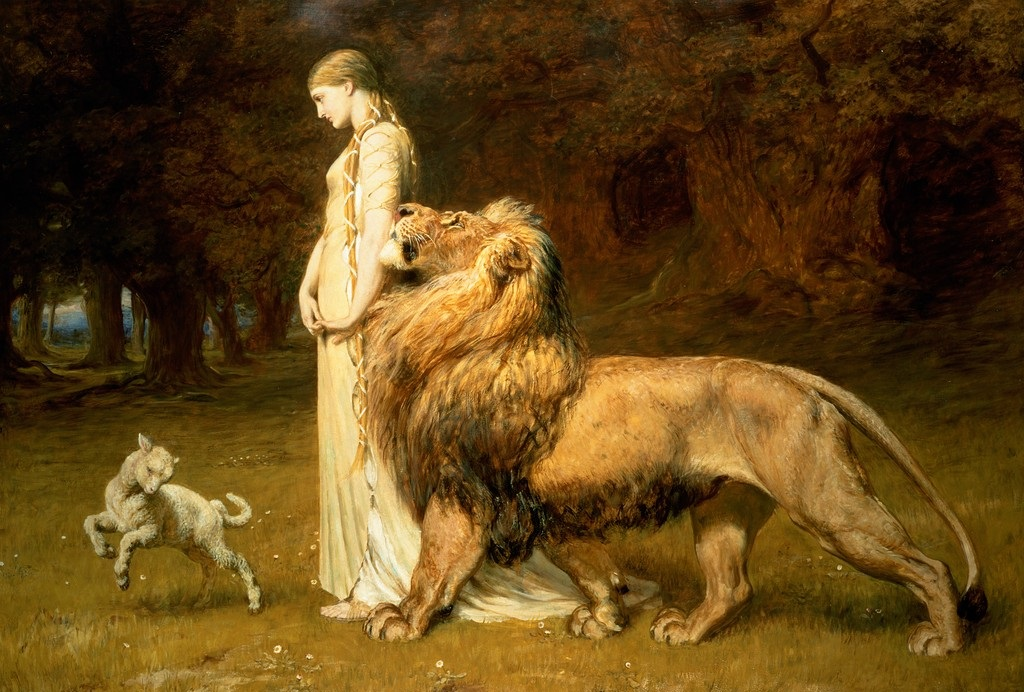
Una and the Lion by Briton Rivière, 1880

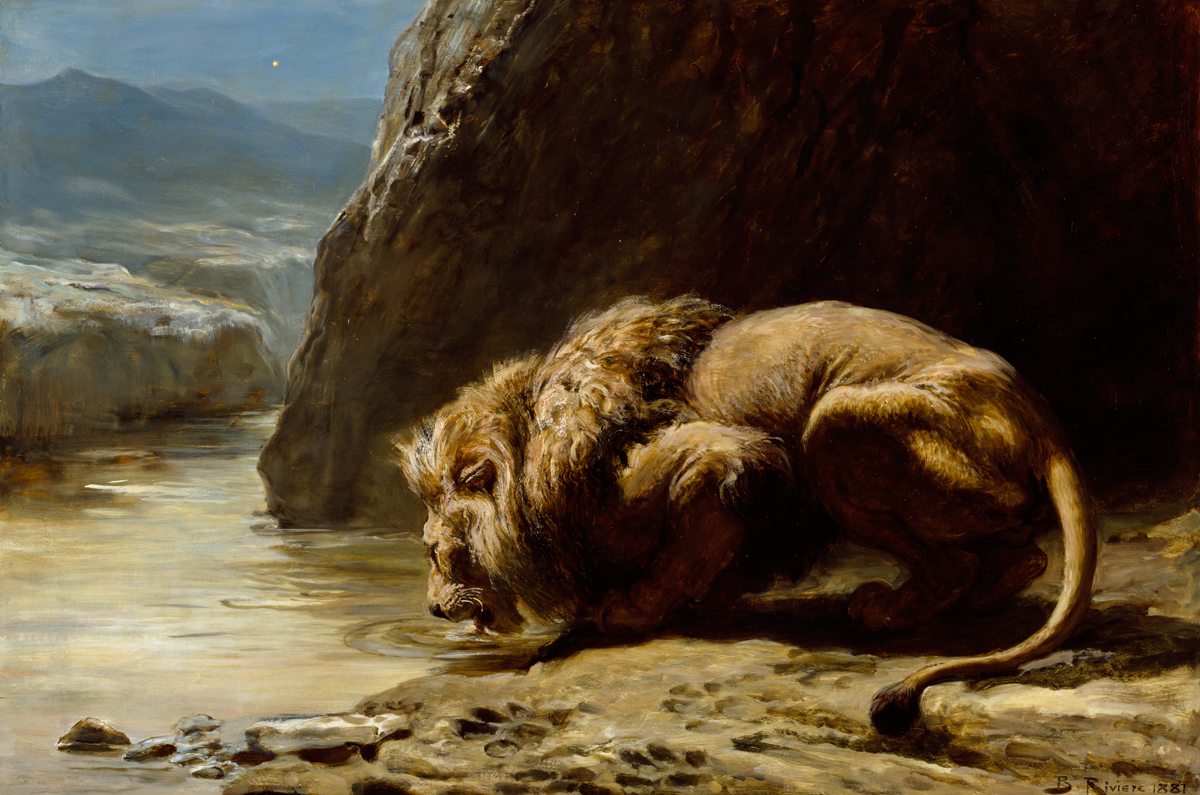
The King Drinks by Briton Rivière, 1881

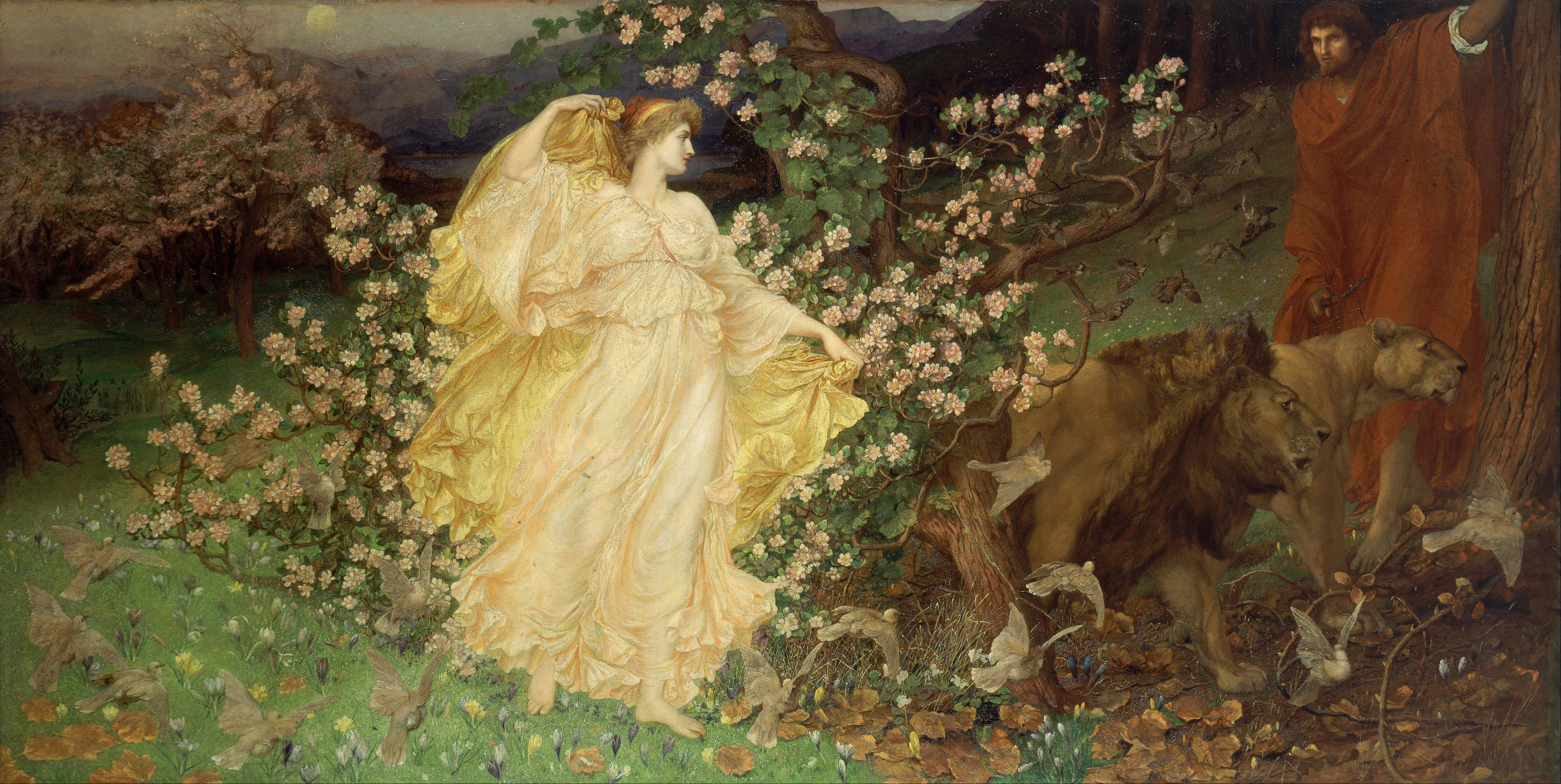
Painting Venus and Anchises by William Blake Richmond (1889 or 90)

=== U.K. ===
- Nelson's Column (1843) in Trafalgar Square, London, UK, four lions sculpted by Edwin Landseer.
- The South Bank Lion, also in London. One of the first sculptures in Coade stone.

=== U.S. ===
- National Zoological Park, two 5,000 pound, reclining brass lions flank the Connecticut Avenue entrance,
- Patience and Fortitude, the two Tennessee marble lions flanking the main entrance to the New York Public Library Main Branch, in Manhattan; sculpted by Edward Clark Potter
- Ulysses S. Grant Memorial, West Front, in the Botanic Garden, Washington D.C., four protective bronze lions crouching on the American flag, sculpted by Henry Merwin Shrady, installed 28 April 1912; shown in the opening credits of the House of Cards
- Mount Ecclesia: the (main) entrance arch, the Lions Arch, is considered to be a contributing structure in the Rosicrucian Fellowship Temple Historic District and is also a local landmark in Oceanside, California. Cast concrete lions stand guard at each end of the arch.

== In heraldry ==
Coat of arms of England

Flag of Sri Lanka

Lion as a primary charge in the coat of arms of Finland (1978 design, based on the 16th-century coat of arms of the Grand Duke of Finland).

The lion is a common charge in heraldry, traditionally symbolizing courage. The following positions of heraldic lions are recognized:

- rampant
- guardant
- reguardant
- passant
- statant
- couchant
- salient
- sejant
- dormant

The lion holds historical significance for English heraldry and symbolism. The Coat of arms of England was a symbol for Richard the Lionheart, and later, for England. For many centuries the lion had been a feature of the Armorial of Plantagenet of the House of Plantagenet, and is still worn by both the England national football team and England and Wales cricket team.

The Royal Banner of Scotland continues to be used widely today and has given rise to its use as the emblem for the Scotland national football team and Rangers F.C. and Dundee United F.C. of the Scottish Premier League, as well as English Premier League club Aston Villa F.C.; and not only sport but businesses such as the French car company Peugeot, the international beer company Lion Nathan, and Caledonian MacBrayne ferries. Arising from heraldic use, the Red Lion is also a popular pub name, with over 600 pubs bearing the name. A rarer inn name is the White Lion, derived from Edward IV of England or the Duke of Norfolk. Though the lion appears on the coats of arms and flags of Lyon and León, the cities' names have an unrelated derivation despite the similarity. Rampant lions are common charges in heraldry. For example, the arms of the Carter of Castle Martin family, Ireland (see Carter-Campbell of Possil) include a pair of rampant combatant lions.

Lions in heraldry

Royal insignia of Cambodia with gajasingha and singha lions

A heraldic lion 'dormant'

Coat of arms of the Kingdom of Iraq (1932–1959), depicting the lion and horse

== Currency ==
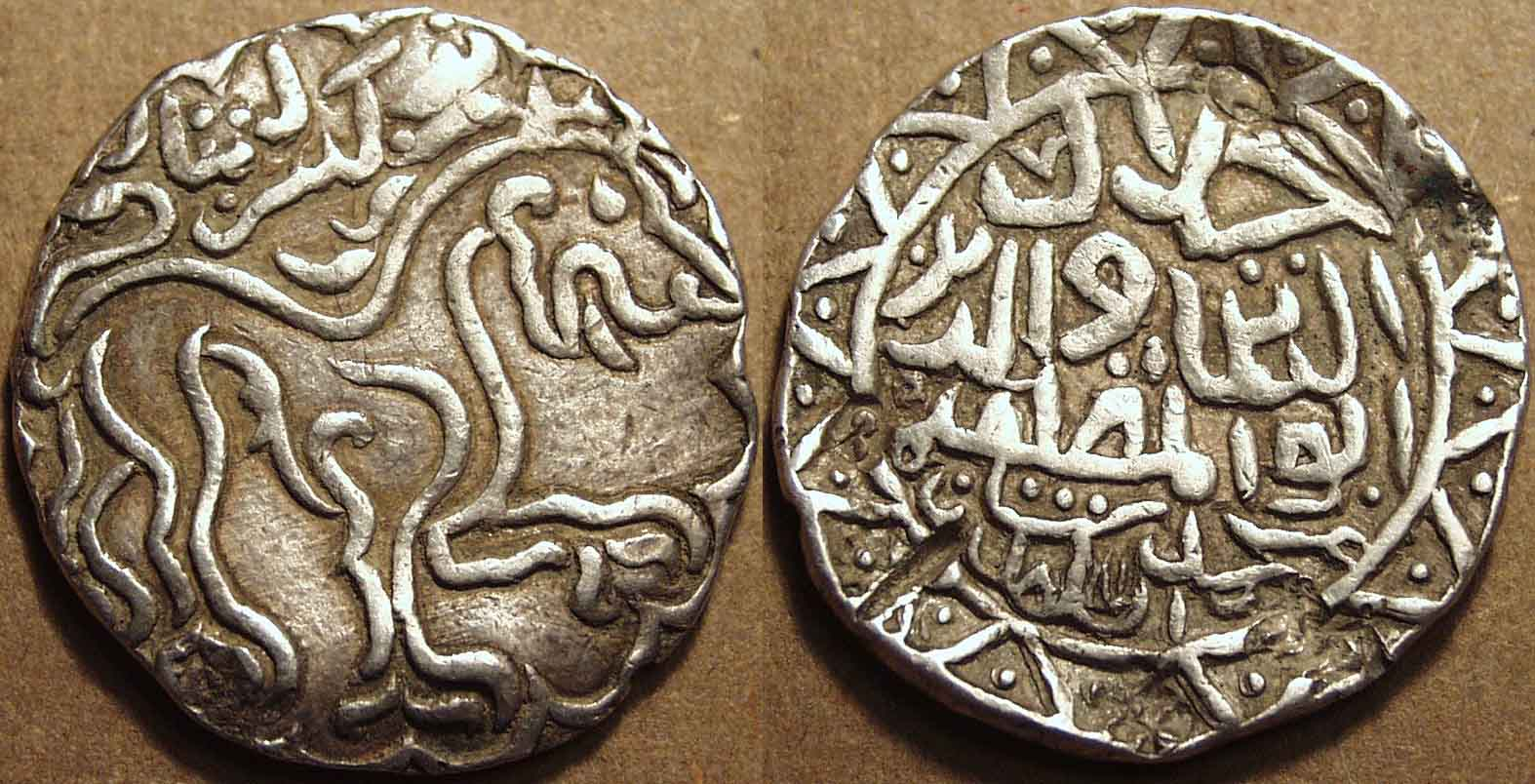
Silver tanka of the Bengal Sultanate ruler Jalaluddin Muhammad Shah (1415–1433), showing a lion Passant, designed on the basis of coins issued by his father, the Hindu Raja Ganesha.

National currencies of three countries in Europe are named after the lion: the Bulgarian lev (Bulgarian: лев, plural: лева, левове / leva, levove), and the Moldovan and Romanian leu (/leŭ/, plural: lei /lej/) all mean "lion".

A lion appears on the South African 50-rand banknotes.

== Names ==
=== Ship names ===
No fewer than 18 consecutive ships of the British Royal Navy bore the name HMS Lion. Various other navies have also used the name for their vessels, as have civil shipping companies.

=== Place names ===
- Singapore's name is the Anglicised form of the original Sanskrit-derived Malay name Singapura, which means 'Lion City'. Malay mythology describes how the founder-prince of Singapore (then called 'Temasek') sighted a strange red and black beast with a mane when he first set ashore the island. Believing it to be a lion and a good omen (although lions were not known to exist anywhere in Southeast Asia) he renamed the island Singapura. The lion features on the Singapore national coat of arms and is also the nickname of the national football team. 'Lion City' is also a common moniker for the city-state.
- Many places in India and greater South Asia use "Singh" in their names
- Using Leon (lion) as a placename started in Ancient Greece; several locations in Greece itself had the name (Greek:: Λέων) as well as a Greek colony in Sicily.
- Lviv, the major city of western Ukraine, is named for Prince Lev I of Galicia. Lev is a common Slavic name meaning "lion". The Latin name for Lviv is Leopolis, meaning "Lion City".
- The name of the city of Oran in Algeria is derived from the Berber root 'HR meaning lion, from which are also derived the names of Tahert and Souk Ahras. The name is attested in multiple Berber languages, for instance as uharu and ahra. A popular Oran legend tells that in the period around 900 BC, there were sightings of lions in the area. The two last felines were killed in a mountain near the city of Oran, which is now known as La montagne des Lions ("The Mountain of Lions"). In fact, there are two giant lion statues in front of Oran's city hall, hence the twin lions' mountain is Oran's symbol.
- Despite common misconception, the name of the French city of Lyon is a corruption of Lugdunum, a Latinization of Celtic for "fortress of god Lugus". The same happens with the Spanish city of León, whose name is a corruption of legio, Latin for "legion". However their coats of arms wear lions as armes parlant.

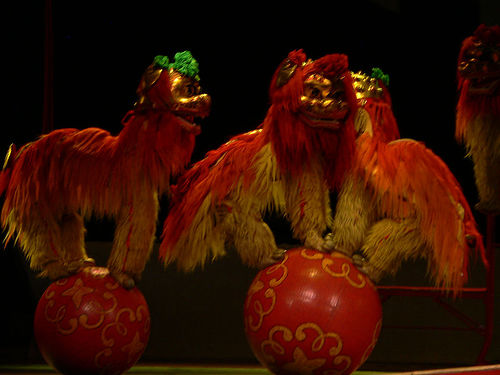
Chinese lions art variety

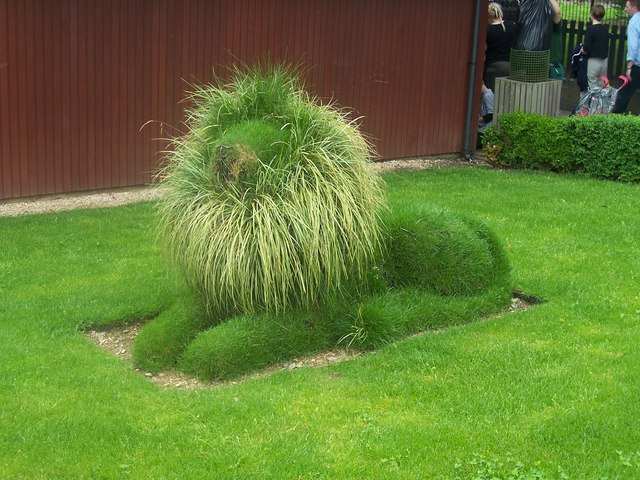
Lion grass sculpture

=== Given names ===
- Lionel traces its etymology from Latin, and means "little lion".
- Leo means "lion".
- Leonard means "lion strength", "lion-strong", or "lion-hearted".

== Modern culture ==
=== Literature ===
- In Thus Spoke Zarathustra by Friedrich Nietzsche, the lion is used as a metaphor to describe a human who rebels against old knowledge, to make a new morality possible. The morality of the overman.
- The lion's symbolism continues in fantasy literature. The Wonderful Wizard of Oz features the Cowardly Lion, who is particularly ashamed of his cowardice because of his cultural role as the "king of the beasts". Aslan, the "Greatest Lion" is the central figure in C.S. Lewis' Narnia series. The word aslan is Turkish for lion. The lion is also the symbol for Gryffindor house, the house of bravery, in J.K. Rowling's Harry Potter series.
- Lafcadio: The Lion Who Shot Back is a 1963 children's book written and illustrated by Shel Silverstein. Lions also tend to appear in several children's stories, being depicted as "the king of the jungle".
- In award-winning children's picture book, Charlie and Mama Kyna, Leo, the lion, befriends and journeys home with Charlie in vivid illustrations.
- In the A Song of Ice and Fire series by George R. R. Martin, one of the main noble houses and main antagonists of the series, the Lannisters, have a golden lion on crimson as their family symbol, and in contrast to the lion being presented as a regal, noble creature in traditional folklore, it carries the undertones of pride, corruption, and lust for power of the Lannisters.
- Again adhering to king of the beast role, the book The Forges of Dawn focuses on the lions (called lyons) as opposed to the other creatures of Africa. These lyons rule empires and, in the case of the antagonists, almost entire continents. They are somewhat evolved from the lions we know today. For example, lyons have more mobile dewclaws as opposed to lions whose dewclaws are more stationary. They also live longer and speak varied languages.
- The Pride of Baghdad is based on a real story of African lions that escaped from Baghdad Zoo in 2003.

=== Film ===
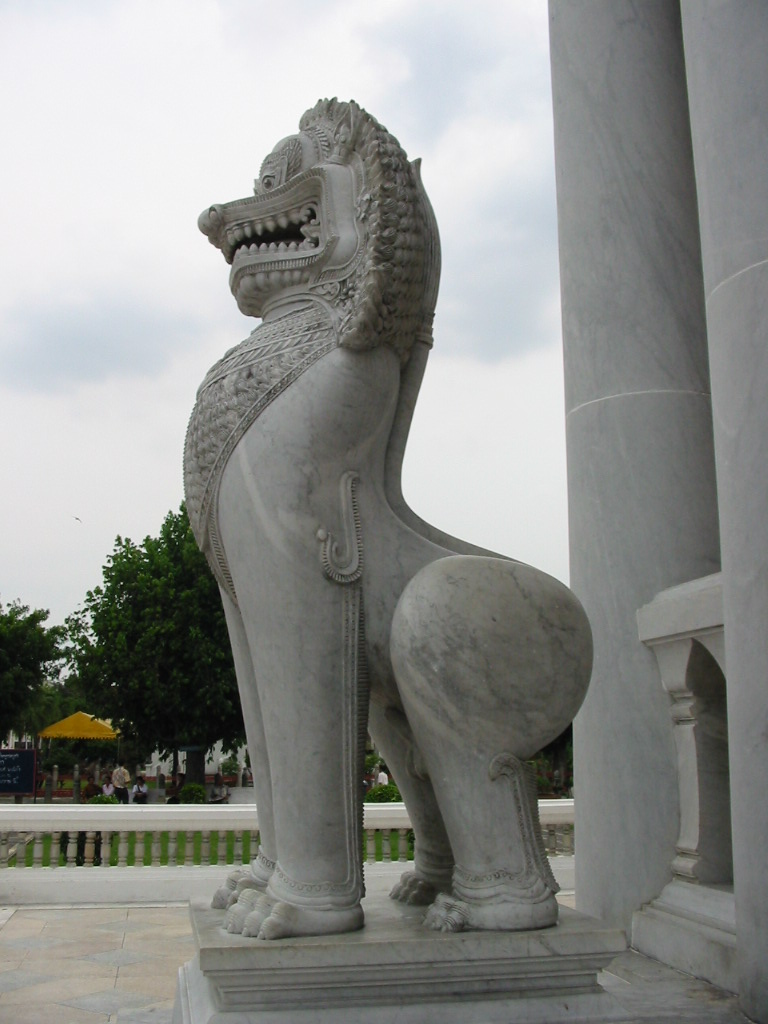
Thai lion marble guardian in Wat Benchamabopit, Thailand

The lion's role as "king of the beasts" has been utilized in a number of cartoons, from the Leonardo Lion of King Leonardo and His Short Subjects (1960–1963) series to the Disney animated feature film The Lion King (1994). Metro-Goldwyn-Mayer studios have used a lion as their logo since 1924. At least seven different lions have played Leo the Lion, the lion seen at the start of every MGM film.

- The live action film Born Free (1966), based on the true story from the bestselling book of the same title, covered the story of the Kenyan lioness Elsa, and the efforts of Joy Adamson and her game-warden husband George to train Elsa for release back into the wild.
- Roar (1981) features numerous untrained lions, three of which were credited as actors. The lions did as they pleased on-set, so they also share writing and directing credits.
- The Ghost and the Darkness (1996) is a movie set in 1898. It is based on the true story of two lions in Africa that killed 130 people over a nine-month period, during the construction of a railroad bridge across the Tsavo River, in what is now Kenya. The local natives named the two lions, both males, "The Ghost" and "The Darkness".
- In 2005, the Kenyan lioness Kamuniak captured international attention when she adopted oryx calves, an animal species normally preyed upon by lions. She fought off predators and lion prides who attempted to eat her charges. Kamuniak's story was captured in the Animal Planet special Heart of a Lioness.

=== Modern symbolism ===
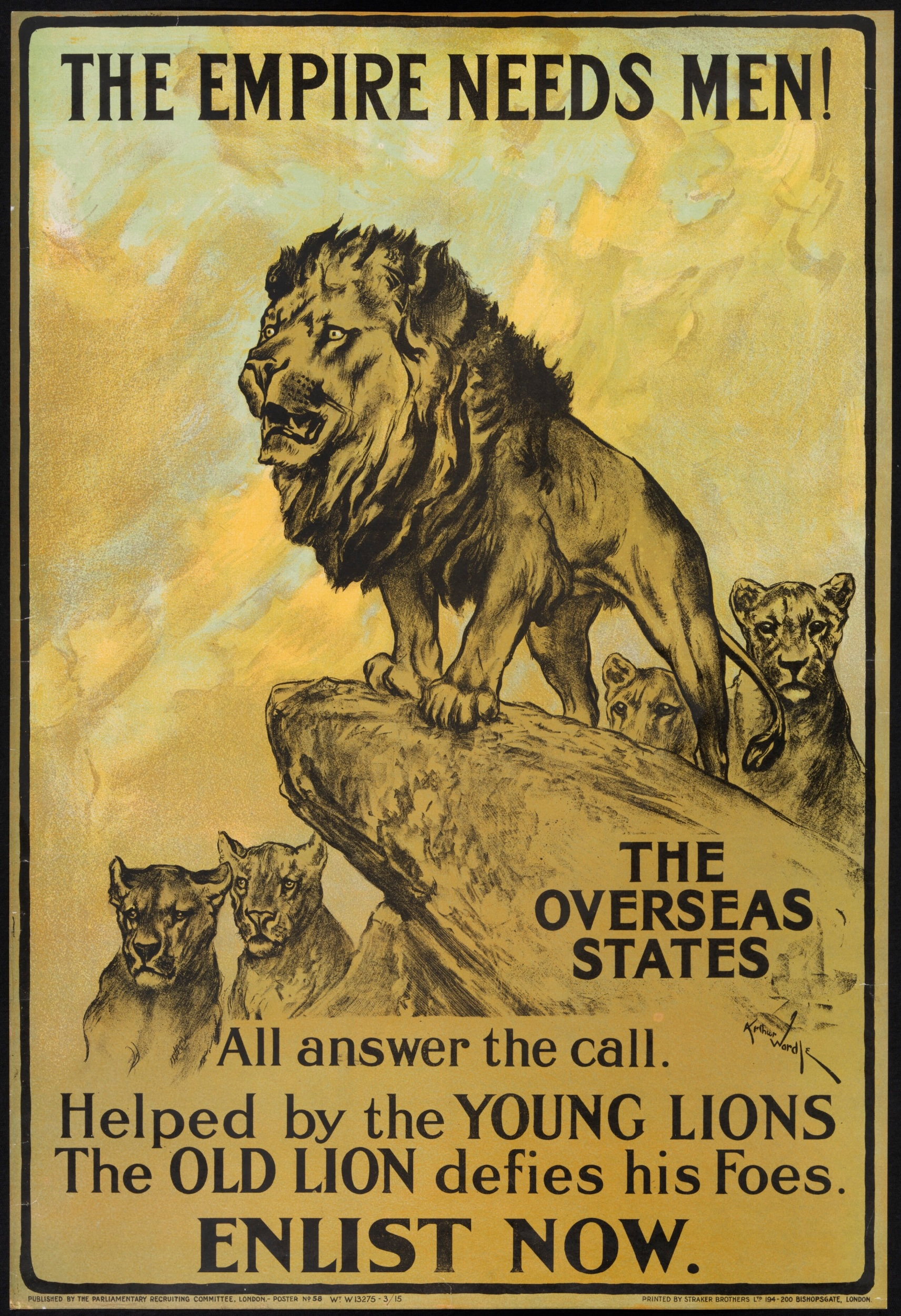
A WWI British enlistment poster depicting Britain as "The Old Lion" and Canada, Australia, New Zealand and India as "The Young Lions"

The lion is a popular mascot or symbol, for businesses, government entities, sports, and other uses; for example:

==== Automotive brands ====
- Some Ford Motor Company motor vehicles of the 1960s and 1970s featured a lion as part of the car emblem, e.g., the Ford Torino, Ford LTD, Mercury Marquis, and Ford XL.
- A modified heraldic lion is the emblem of Australian car company Holden, an iconic Australian brand.
- Peugeot has as symbol a lion in heraldic style, a French mark
- INKAS, Büssing, MAN AG and Roewe all feature lions in their branding for their automobiles

==== Government entities ====
- Patience and Fortitude, the large stone lions outside the main branch of the New York Public Library, are the mascots of the New York Public Library system serving the Bronx, Manhattan, and Staten Island.
- The Flag of Iran bore the Lion and Sun from 1576 to 1979.
- In Brazil, the lion is a popular symbol of the income tax.

==== Political parties ====
- Shiromani Akali Dal (Amritsar) (political party in India) uses a Khanda, flanked by 2 lions as its emblem.

==== Sports ====
- The 1966 FIFA World Cup and the 2006 FIFA World Cup both used lions as their mascot.
- Turkish major football club Galatasaray SK has been symbolized by a lion since the 1930s.
- The Detroit Lions of the National Football League have featured a lion in their logo since 1934.
- IPL teams Chennai Super Kings, Punjab Kings, Rajasthan Royals, Royal Challengers Bangalore, and the Gujarat Lions all used lions in their logos.
- MMA fighter Amanda Nunes uses the ring name "The Lioness"
- The Saitama Seibu Lions in the Nippon Professional Baseball League have used lion-themed branding since 1951.
- The primary logo of the Premier League, the highest level of the English football league system, features a lion. Lions are also incorporated into the Premier League trophy, which is awarded to the league's championship team.
- Columbia University's athletic teams have used a lion mascot since 1910. The lion mascot is a reference to the school's royal origin.

== See also ==
- Lion-baiting
- Winged lion
- Piraeus Lion
- Medici lions
- Manticore (mythical part-lion beast)
- Khoekhoe Lion Story
- Lion of Amphipolis
- Lion of Venice
- Animal representation in Western medieval art
