= Al-Assad (disambiguation) =

The Al-Assad family is a Syrian political family that has ruled Syria from 1970 following a coup d'état until 2024 after being overthrown in an offensive.

al-Assad or Assad (Arabic: الْأَسَد) may also refer to:

== People ==
- Assad Assad (born 1944) Israeli Druze politician
- Members of the Syrian al-Assad family:
  - Hafez al-Assad, 20th century president of Syria
  - Bashar al-Assad, 21st century president of Syria
  - Maher al-Assad, Syrian general and commander of the Syrian Republican Guard
  - Rifaat al-Assad, Syrian major general
  - Jamil al-Assad, Syrian Parliament member
  - Bassel al-Assad

== Places ==
- Al Asad Airbase (IATA airport code: IQA; ICAO airport code: ORAA), Al-Anbar Province, Iraq
- Bassel Al-Assad International Airport, former name of Latakia International Airport, Syria
- Lake Assad, former name of Euphrates Lake, a reservoir on the Euphrates in Syria

== Facilities and structures ==
- Bassel al-Assad Swimming Complex, former name of Anatolia Swimming Complex, in Aleppo, Syria

== Other uses ==
- ASAD syndrome (Adult Separation Anxiety Disorder)
- Asad (film), 2011 film nominated for 2012 Oscars, directed by Bryan Buckley
- Assad-class corvette, an Italian-built Iraqi naval ship class

== See also ==
- Asad (disambiguation)
- Assadism, the political philosophy of the Syrian Ba'athist Party
- President Assad (disambiguation)
- Asadullah (disambiguation)
- Assads (disambiguation)
- Lions in Islam
- Lion (disambiguation)
- Shir (disambiguation), a Persian term for 'Lion'
