= Asad (disambiguation) =

Asad is an Arabic male given name.

Asad or Assad may also refer to:

- Asad (film), a 2012 South African-American short film
- Al-Assad family, a Syrian political family
- Lake Assad

== See also ==
- As'ad, an Arabic male given name
- Al-Assad (disambiguation), including Assad
- Asada (disambiguation)
- Asadi (disambiguation)
- Assads (disambiguation)
