= Ash-Shams =

91st chapter of the Qur'an

Surah 91 of the Quran
الشمس Ash-Shams The Sun
- Qira'ah; English text
- Classification: Meccan
- Position: Juzʼ 30
- No. of verses: 15
- No. of words: 54
- No. of letters: 249

Ash-Shams
Recitation of Ash-Shams in mujawwad.

Ash-Shams (Arabic: الشمس, "The Sun") is the 91st surah of the Qur'an, with 15 ayat or verses. It opens with a series of solemn oaths sworn on various astronomical phenomena, the first of which, "by the sun", gives the sura its name, then on the human soul itself. It then describes the fate of Thamud, a formerly prosperous but now extinct Arab tribe. The prophet Saleh urged them to worship God alone, and commanded them in God's name to preserve a certain she-camel; they disobeyed and continued to reject his message; they killed the she-camel and nine of them plotted to kill Saleh and his followers, so God destroyed those who had wronged the people of Thamud and saved Saleh and the righteous believers who had followed him.

== Summary ==
- 1-10, Oaths that man's happiness and misery depends on the purity or corruption he hath wrought in it
- 11-15, Thamúd destroyed for rejecting their prophet

== Name of the surah ==
Jalaluddin Al-Suyuti, co-author of the classical Sunni tafsīr known as Tafsir al-Jalalayn suggests that some of the sūrahs have been named using incipits (i.e. the first few words of the surah). The Surah has been so designated after the word ash-shams with which it opens. Hamiduddin Farahi wrote that some sūrahs have been named after some conspicuous words used in them. Touched by an Angel: Tafseer Juz 'Amma is an AlMaghrib Institute Tafsir course which further investigates that the sun (ash-shams) is mentioned in several surahs; the reason why is this one called Surah Shams is because, in it, the sun is mentioned four times. Allah says:
91:1 وَالشَّمْسِ وَضُحَاهَا
91:2 وَالْقَمَرِ إِذَا تَلَاهَا
91:3 وَالنَّهَارِ إِذَا جَلَّاهَا
91:4 وَاللَّيْلِ إِذَا يَغْشَاهَا

Translation: By the sun and its brightness, and [by] the moon when it follows it. And [by] the day when it displays it, and [by] the night when it covers it. [Surah Ash-Shams, verses 1-4]. Notice "it," "it," "it," ... in Arabic, the pronoun used is haa (هَا), which is feminine. And all the other nouns referred to are masculine; which only leaves Ash-Shams–the sun–which is a feminine word; that's the "it" referred to in the first four ayaat.

== Period of revelation ==
Sūrat ash-Shams is a Meccan surah. Meccan suras are chronologically earlier surahs that were revealed to Muhammad at Mecca before the hijrah to Medina in 622 CE. They are typically shorter, with relatively short ayat, and mostly come near the end of the Qur'an's 114 surahs. Most of the surahs containing muqattaʿat are Meccan. In his book, The Corân, William Muir classifies ash-Shams in a Quranic sub-category known as the Soliloquies - a literary form of discourse in which Muhammad talks to himself or reveals his thoughts without addressing a listener. However, Sale argues that this sūrah seems to be ruled out of that category by the change in style of āyāt.

== Theme and subject matter ==
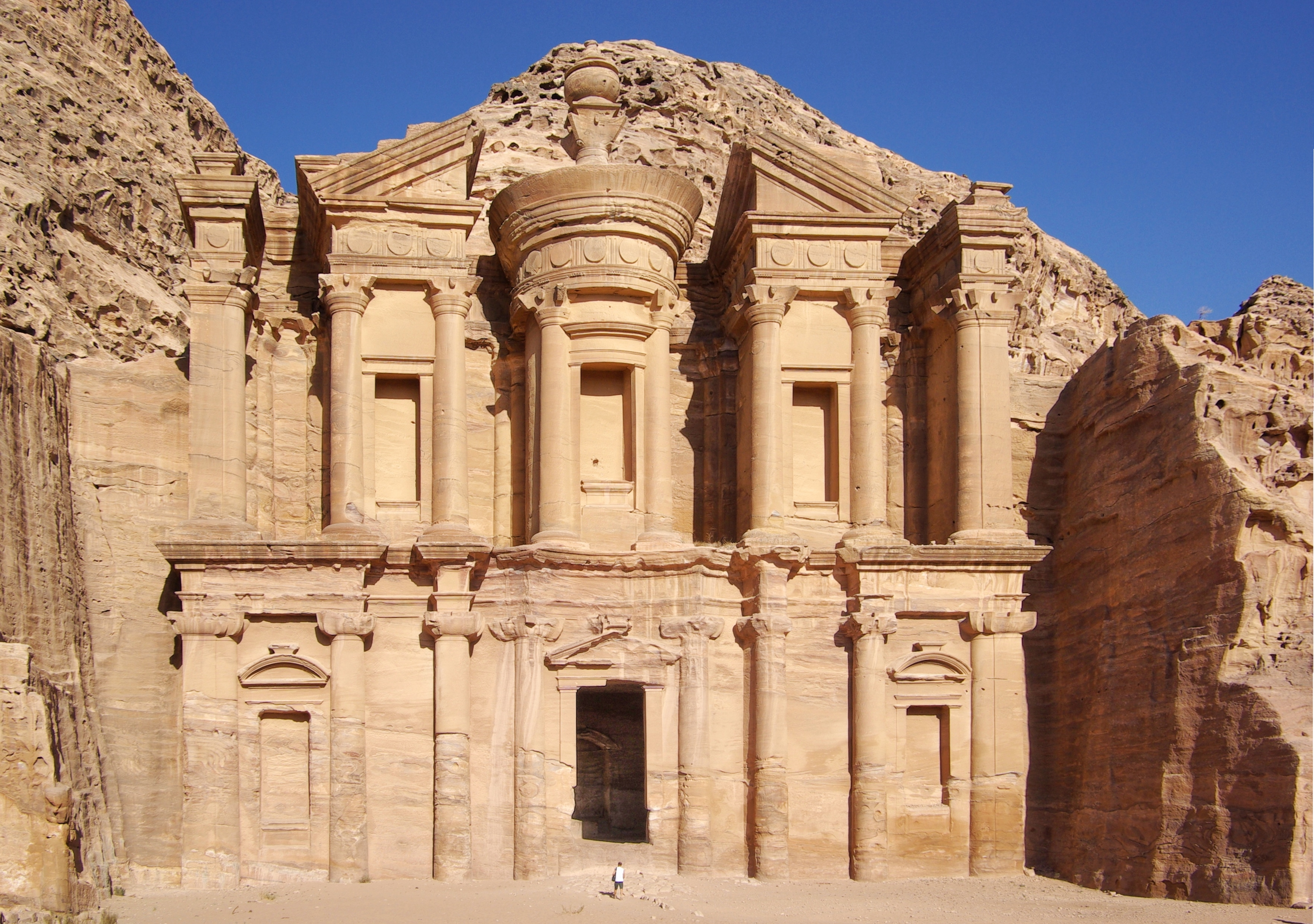
The ruins of Mada'in Saleh are often compared with those of Petra, the Nabatean capital 500 kilometres (310 mi) northwest of Mada'in Saleh.

In view of the subject matter, this Surah consists of two parts. The first part consists of vv. 1-10, and the second of vv. 11-15.

According to an account from the book A Comprehensive Commentary on the Quran, translated by George Sale, Principal Subjects of verses 1-10 is "Oaths that man's happiness and misery depends on the purity or corruption he hath wrought in it" and "Thamúd destroyed for rejecting their prophet" in verses 11-15.

Sayyid Qutb (d. 1966), who was an Egyptian author, Islamist of the Muslim Brotherhood in Egypt and was seen as a controversial intellectual due to his justification of violence against civilians, surmised the overall theme of Surat Al-Lail in the introduction to his extensive Quranic commentary, Fi Zilal al-Quran by saying:

This sūrah, which maintains the same rhyme in all its verses and keeps the same musical beat throughout, starts with several aesthetic touches which seem to spring out from the surrounding universe and its phenomena. These phenomena form the framework which encompasses the great truth which is the subject matter of the sūrah, namely, the nature of man, his inherent abilities, choice of action, and responsibility in determining his own fate.

This sūrah also refers to the story of the Thamūd and their negative attitude to the warnings they received from God's messenger, to their killing of the she-camel, and finally their complete annihilation. This provides an example of the unpromising prospects which await those who corrupt their souls instead of keeping them pure and who do not confine themselves within the limits of piety. "Successful is the one who keeps it pure, and ruined is the one who corrupts it." (Verses 9-10).Quran 90:9–10 ^{(Yusuf Ali)}

—Sayid Qutb, Fi Zilal al-Quran

Javed Ahmad Ghamidi (b. 1951), a well-known Pakistani Muslim theologian, Quran scholar and exegete, and educationist, surmised the overall theme of Surah Shams as The leaders of the Quraysh have been warned, on the basis of the law of retribution, about their rebellious and arrogant attitude towards the Prophetic mission. And his analysis of subject says:

The existence of pairs --- like the sun and the moon, the night and the day and the earth and the sky --- as a general rule in the manifestations of nature shows that just as either member of a pair needs its complement to become meaningful, this world also is incomplete unless it is viewed together with its complement: the Day of Reward and Punishment.

The innate concepts about good and evil in the human soul and the perfection given to it also testify to this reality --- the Day of Judgement. A mention of the pathways which will lead to success and doom in the Hereafter.

Historical evidence is presented on the law of retribution to thereby indirectly warn the Quraysh that if they too exceed the limits in their arrogant and rebellious attitude, like the people of the Thamud, then they will be totally wiped out, and the Almighty shall enforce his decision on them without any hesitation.

—Javed Ahmad Ghamidi

The Theme of Surah ash-Shams presented in Malik Al-Qur'an Translation coincides with Javed Ahmad Ghamidi's theme and overlaps with thematic analysis of Sayyid Maududi which says:

While narrating this story of the Thamud nowhere in the Surah has it been said "O people of Quraish, if you rejected your Prophet, Muhammad (upon whom be Allah's peace and blessings), as the Thamud had rejected theirs, you too would meet with the same fate as they met." The conditions at that time in Makkah were similar to those that had been created by the wicked among the people of Thamud against the Prophet Salih (peace be upon him). Therefore, the narration of this story in those conditions was by itself enough to suggest to the people of Makkah how precisely this historical precedent applied to them. —Abul A'la Maududi

And that its theme is to distinguish the good from the evil and to warn the people, who were refusing to understand this distinction and insisting on following the evil way, of the evil end. However Malik argues that Major Issue, Divine Law and Guidance in this surah is that "Success depends on keeping the soul pure and failure depends on corrupting it, people of Thamud were leveled to the ground for that very reason."

=== 1-10 Good and evil ===
BY the Sun, and its rising brightness۝ by the moon when she followeth him۝by the day, when it showeth its splendor۝by the night, when it covereth him with darkness۝by the heaven, and him who built it۝by the earth, and him who spread it forth۝by the soul, and him who completely formed it۝and inspired into the same its faculty of distinguishing, and power of choosing, wickedness and piety: now is he who hath purified the same, happy۝but he who hath corrupted the same, is miserable.

— Q91:1-10

The first part deals with three things:-:

1-That just as the sun and the moon, the day and the night, the earth and the sky, are different from each other and contradictory in their effects and results, so are the good and the evil different front each other and contradictory in their effects and results; they are neither alike in their outward appearance nor can they be alike in their results.

2-That God after giving the human self powers of the body, sense and mind has not left it uninformed in the world, but has instilled into his unconscious by means of a natural inspiration the distinction between good and evil, right and wrong, and the sense of the good to be good and of the evil to be evil.

3-That the future of man depends on how by using the powers of discrimination, will and judgement that Allah has endowed him with, he develops the good and suppresses the evil tendencies of the self. If he develops the good inclination and frees his self of the evil inclinations, he will attain to eternal success, and if, on the contrary, he suppresses the good and promotes the evil, he will meet with disappointment and failure. Sahl al-Tustari (d. 896), a Sufi and scholar of the Qur'an, mentions, "By the day when it reveals her [the sun], He said: This means: the light of faith removes the darkness of ignorance and extinguishes the flames of the Fire.

=== 11-15 Historical precedent of the people of Thamud ===
The Thamud (people) rejected (their prophet) through their inordinate wrong-doing, Behold, the most wicked man among them was deputed (for impiety). But the Messenger of Allah said to them: "It is a She-camel of Allah! And (bar her not from) having her drink!" Then they rejected him (as a false prophet), and they hamstrung her. So their Lord, on account of their crime, obliterated their traces and made them equal (in destruction, high and low)! And for Him is no fear of its consequences.

— Quran 91:11–15 ^{(Yusuf Ali)}

In the second part citing the historical precedent of the people of Thamud the significance of prophethood has been brought out. A messenger is raised in the world, because the inspirational knowledge of good and evil that Allah has placed in human nature, is by itself not enough for the guidance of man, but on account of his failure to understand it fully man has been proposing wrong criteria and theories of good and evil and thus going astray. That is why Allah sent down clear and definite revelation to the prophets to augment man's natural inspiration so that they may expound to the people as to what is good and what is evil. Likewise, the prophet Saleh was sent to the people of Thamud, but the people overwhelmed by the evil of their self, had become so rebellious that they rejected him. And when he presented before them the miracle of the She-Camel of God, as demanded by themselves, the most wretched one of them, in spite of his warning, hamstrung it, in accordance with the will and desire of the people. Consequently, the entire tribe was overtaken by a disaster.

The last verse (وَلَا يَخَافُ عُقْبَـٰهَا) has an alternative reading: ("فَلا يَخَافُ عُقْبَاهَا") and it is subject to varying interpretations among scholars. The suggestion that God has no fear is not appropriate when considering the divine nature of God in Islamic theology. Fear is a human attribute associated with vulnerability, uncertainty, and the possibility of harm, none of which apply to God, who is omnipotent, omniscient, and completely self-sufficient. God’s actions are driven by wisdom and justice, not by fear or anxiety. In the context of the verse (وَلَا يَخَافُ عُقْبَـٰهَا), interpreting it to mean that God does not fear any consequences would imply that there could be some form of repercussion or retaliation against God, which contradicts His supreme and transcendent nature.

As such and by drawing a parallel to the meaning of "تَخَوُّفٍ" (gradual loss) as used in Surah An-Nahl: ("أَوْ يَأْخُذَهُمْ عَلَىٰ تَخَوُّفٍ") (or He will seize them by causing them a gradual loss), it can be understood to mean that after God's retribution was executed upon the people of Thamud, nothing was left of their life that would necessitate a gradual seizing or causing of further loss. Essentially, the punishment was so complete and absolute that there was no need for any further divine intervention or gradual punitive measures. This interpretation highlights the totality and finality of the divine punishment, leaving no room for lingering effects or gradual losses to be further executed.

Another interpretation involves the word "عُقْبَـٰهَا" which can be understood to mean "its descendants" as used in Surah Az-Zukhruf:("وَجَعَلَهَا كَلِمَةً بَاقِيَةً فِي عَقِبِهِ لَعَلَّهُمْ يَرْجِعُونَ")(And He made it a lasting word among his descendants so that they might return [to it]). In this context, "عُقْبَـٰهَا" refers to the progeny or descendants of the people of Thamud. This interpretation suggests that after the divine retribution was executed upon Thamud, the surviving believers and their descendants would not fear oppression or harm from the disbelieving people. The punishment was so decisive and complete that it not only eradicated the immediate wrongdoers but also ensured safety and peace for the faithful and their progeny, thus eliminating any fear of future oppression by the disbelievers. This understanding underscores the protective aspect of divine intervention, safeguarding the believers and their lineage from the tyranny and injustice of the disbelievers. This interpretation is further supported by noting the alternative reading of the verse: **"فَلا يَخَافُ عُقْبَاهَا"** "so that its descendants do not fear."

== Asbāb al-nuzūl ==
Asbāb al-nuzūl (occasions or circumstances of revelation) is a secondary genre of Qur'anic exegesis (tafsir) directed at establishing the context in which specific verses of the Qur'an were revealed. Though of some use in reconstructing the Qur'an's historicity, asbāb is by nature an exegetical rather than a historiographical genre, and as such usually associates the verses it explicates with general situations rather than specific events. Most of the mufassirūn say that this surah was revealed at Mecca, at a stage when opposition to Muhammad had grown very strong and intense.

== Special traits of Sūrat ash-Shams ==
Muhammad is reported to have said that the reward of reciting this surah is compared to the things upon which the sun and the moon shine. The Shi'i Imam Ja'far al-Sadiq (d. 748) said that the person who recites the surah ash-Shams, al-Lail, adh-Dhuha and al-Inshirah will, on the Day of Judgement, find all creatures of the earth testifying on his behalf and Allah will accept their testimony and give him a place in Jannah (Paradise).

== Ahadith about Surah ash-Shams ==
`Abd Allah ibn `Umar (c. 614 – 693) narrated that while Muhammad was passing by Thamud's houses on his way to the Battle of Tabouk, he stopped together with the people there. The people fetched water from the wells from which the people of Thamud used to drink. They prepared their dough (for baking) and filled their water skins from it (the water from the wells). Muhammad ordered them to empty the water skins and give the prepared dough to the camels. Then he went away with them until they stopped at the well from which the she-camel (of Salih) used to drink. He warned them against entering upon the people that had been punished, saying "Do not enter the house of those who were unjust to themselves, unless (you enter) weeping, lest you should suffer the same punishment as was inflicted upon them."

Narrated Jabir ibn Abd-Allah: Muadh ibn Jabal used to pray with the Prophet and then go to lead his people in prayer. Once he led the people in prayer and recited Al-Baqara. A man left (the row of the praying people) and offered (light) prayer (separately) and went away. When Mu'adh learned of it, he said. "He (that man) is a hypocrite." Later that man heard what Mu'adh said about him, so he came to the Prophet and said, "O Allah's Apostle! We are people who work with our own hands and irrigate (our farms) with our camels. Last night Mu'adh led us in the (night) prayer and he recited Sura-al-Baqara, so I offered my prayer separately, and because of that, he accused me of being a hypocrite." The Prophet called Mu'adh and said thrice, "O Mu'adh! You are putting the people to trials? Recite 'Wash-shamsi wad-uhaha' (91) or'Sabbih isma Rabbi ka-l-A'la' (87) or the like." (Book #73, Hadith #127)

Narrated Jabir ibn Abd-Allah: Once a man was driving two Nadihas (camels used for agricultural purposes) and night had fallen. He found Mu'adh praying so he made his camel kneel and joined Mu'adh in the prayer. the latter recited Surat 'AlBaqara" or Surat "An-Nisa", (so) the man left the prayer and went away. When he learned that Mu'adh had criticized him, he went to the Prophet, and complained against Mu'adh. the Prophet said thrice, "O Mu'adh ! Are you putting the people to trial?" It would have been better if you had recited "Sabbih Isma Rabbika-l-a-la (87)", Wash-Shamsi wadu-haha (91)", or "Wal-laili Idha yaghsha (92)", for the old, the weak and the needy pray behind you." Jabir said that Mu'adh recited Sura Al-Baqara in the 'Isha' prayer. (Volume 1, Book 11(Call to Prayer), Number 673)

== See also ==
- Ancient towns in Saudi Arabia
- Atlantis of the Sands
- Biblical narratives and the Qur'an
- Legends and the Qur'an
- Meccan sura
- Prophets of Islam
- Shamash
- She-Camel of God
- Stories of The Prophets
- Thamud
