= Hud (surah) =

11th chapter of the Qur'an

Surah 11 of the Quran
هُود Hūd Hud
- Qira'ah; English text
- Classification: Meccan
- Position: Juzʼ 11 to 12
- Hizb no.: 22 to 24
- No. of verses: 123
- No. of Rukus: 10
- No. of words: 1946
- No. of letters: 7817

Hud (Arabic: هود, romanized: Hūd, lit. 'Hud') is the 11th chapter (Surah) of the Quran and has 123 verses (ayat). It relates in part to the prophet Hud. Regarding the timing and contextual background of the revelation (asbāb al-nuzūl), it is an earlier "Meccan surah", which means it is believed to have been revealed in Mecca, instead of later in Medina.

Verses 105–112 are preserved in the Ṣan‘ā’1 lower text.

== Summary ==
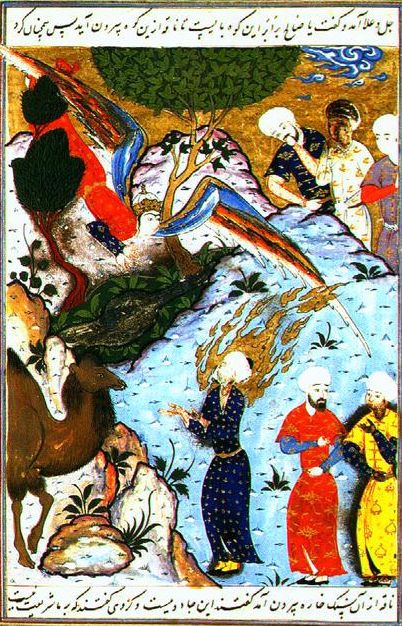
Illumination of Salih and the she-camel, 427 AH (mid-11th century CE)

=== Opening ===
- 1–2 The Quran a revelation from God
- 3–5 Muhammad a warner and a preacher of goodness
- 6 Infidels cannot hide their sin from God
- 7–8 God the Creator and Preserver of all creatures
- 8 The resurrection rejected by the infidels as sorcery
- 9 They scoff at threatened punishment
- 10–11 Mercy and judgment alike disregarded by infidels
- 12 Those who persevere in good works shall be rewarded
- 13 The unbelievers demand a sign from heaven
- 14 Muhammad charged with forging the Qurán
- 14–15 He challenges the infidels to produce ten chapters like it, or to become Muslims
- 16–17 The miserable fate of those who live for this present world
- 18 Moses and the Jews attest the truth of the Qurán
- 19–23 The maligners of prophets shall be cursed
- 24 The blessed portion of believers
- 25 Comparison of believers and nonbelievers

=== History of Noah ===
- 26–27 He is sent as a public preacher
- 28 The chiefs of his people reject him as a liar
- 29–32 Noah protests his integrity; refuses to drive away his poor followers; deprecates being thought a seer or an angel
- 33 His people challenge him to bring on the threatened judgment
- 34–35 Noah declares that God destroys and saves whom he pleaseth
- 36 Noah's people declare his message a forgery
- 37 God tells Noah that no more of his people will believe on him
- 38 He is commanded to make an ark
- 39 Noah builds the ark and is derided by the people
- 40–41 Embarks with his followers and one pair each of the animals
- 42–43 Noah in vain entreats his unbelieving son to embark
- 44 The waters abate and the ark rests on Al Júdi
- 45 Noah pleads with God for his son
- 46 God reproves him for his intercession for his son
- 47 Noah repents and asks pardon for his fault
- 48 He descends from the ark
- 49 This history a secret revealed to Muhammad

=== History of Hūd ===
- 50–52 He is sent to call Ád from idolatry
- 53 The Ádites reject him as a liar
- 54–57 Hūd protests his integrity, and declares his trust in God to save him from their plots
- 58 God delivers Hūd and his followers
- 59–60 The Ádites reject their messenger and are destroyed

=== History of Sálih ===
- 61 He is sent to call the Thamúdites from idolatry
- 62 They reject his message
- 63–64 Sálih protests his integrity, and gives them a she-camel as a sign from God
- 65 They kill the camel, and are threatened with destruction
- 66 Sálih and his followers are saved from destruction
- 67–68 The Thamúdites are miserably destroyed

=== History of Abraham and Lot ===
- 69 God's messengers sent to Abraham—He entertains them
- 70 He is filled with fear because they refuse to eat his meat
- 70–71 The angels quiet his fears and tell him they are sent to the people of Lot
- 71–73 Sarah receives the promise of Isaac and Jacob
- 74 Abraham intercedes for the people of Lot
- 75 The angels refuse his request
- 76 Lot is anxious for the safety of his angel visitors
- 77–79 The Sodomites attack his house
- 80 The angels warn Lot to leave the city and inform him of the destruction impending over his people and his wife
- 81–82 The cities are overthrown and the people killed by a shower of bricks

=== History of Shuaib ===
- 83 He is sent to call the Midianites from idolatry
- 84–86 He reproaches them for dishonest weights and measures
- 87 The people reject him, refusing to leave their idols
- 88–90 Shuaib protests his integrity, and exhorts them to flee the fate of the people of Noah, Hūd, Sálih, and Lot
- 91 The people threaten to stone him
- 92–94 Shuaib threatens them with Divine judgment
- 95–96 God destroys the infidels, but saves Shuaib and his followers

=== History of Moses ===
- 97 He is sent with signs to Pharaoh and his princes
- 98–100 They reject him, and are consigned to hell-fire
- 101–105 Exhortation and warning drawn from the fate of these cities
- 106–109 The condition of the righteous and wicked in judgment
- 110 Muhammad not to doubt about the religion of the Quraish

=== Conclusion ===
- 111 The Quraish doubt the Quran as the Jews did the Pentateuch
- 112 God will punish their evil deeds
- 113–114 Muhammad exhorted to be steadfast
- 115 An exhortation to prayer
- 116–118 God just in destroying the unbelieving cities
- 119 The unbelievers predestinated to damnation
- 120 The whole history of the prophets related to Muhammad
- 121–122 Unbelievers threatened
- 123 Muhammad exhorted to put his trust in God

== Exegesis ==
Quran 11 opens with a discussion on the nature of man and the punishment that awaits those who defy God. Thereafter, the main content of the surah is a series of stories of prophets who warned their people to follow God, the people persisting in defying God, and God punishing and killing them.

=== 25-49 The story of Noah ===
Verses 11:25-49 tell the story of Noah and how his people did not believe his commands to follow God. The non-believers are drowned in a flood, which includes Noah's son; Noah asks God about this act, but God rebukes Noah as being ignorant and says that Noah's son is "not a member of his family." Surah 66, At-Tahrim, elaborates on this and says that Noah's wife is a non-believer in hell who was unfaithful to her husband.

=== 50-60 The prophet Hud is sent to the ʿĀd ===
Verses 11:50-60 deal with the prophet Hud, the namesake of the Surah. He was sent to the ʿĀd, an Omani tribe which according to history crumbled sometime between the 3rd and 6th century AD. The ʿĀd did not believe Hud. While, Hud and those who do believe are rescued by God, followed by God inflicting a "dreadful doom" on them so that they were "accursed in the world."

=== 61-68 The people of Thamud and the prophet Saleh ===
Verses 11:61-68 concern the people of Thamud and the prophet Saleh. Saleh tries to convince Thamud to repent, but once more the unbelievers ignore the prophet. Saleh offers a she-camel as an offering of peace, but says that it should be left alone. If anything befalls it, the people will be punished. They did not listen to the prophet and they killed the Camal. The camel is hamstrung, Saleh and those who believe are rescued, and the unbelievers are smitten by a "blast from heaven."

=== 69-84 Sodom and Gomorrah ===
The story of Sodom and Gomorrah is in Verses 11:69-84. Abraham and Sarah are given the news of their son and grandson's forthcoming birth (Isaac and Jacob), after which they plead for mercy for Lot's people. God refuses the request, saying that the punishment cannot be averted (contrast with the Torah account). Lot offers his daughters( for marriage )to the men of Sodom, but they respond with disinterest and say "you know what we want."

=== 80-84 Homosexuality ===
Verses 11:80-84 describes homosexuality as being the crime of Lot's people. Angels descend to protect Lot and his daughters, and the city is destroyed by a stone rain. Lot's wife perishes as well.

=== 85-95 The prophet Shu'aib sent to Midian ===
Verse 11:85-95 deal with the prophet Shu'aib sent to Midian. Once more, the people ignore the prophet's warnings; this time, Shu'aib reminds the people of the fate of the people of Noah, Hud, Saleh, and Lot. It doesn't work, and the people spare Shu'aib from death by stoning only. This is because he comes from a powerful clan. Shu'aib and those who believe are rescued by God. Afterward, the unbelievers "[were] seized by a punishment from heaven, and lay overturned in their homes in the morning as though they had not dwelt there at all."

The Ending

The remaining verses discuss the general theme once more, with occasional references to Moses. The harsh punishment is explained as "We did not wrong them; they wronged themselves." Other gods are decried as false, powerless, and useless. Believers are commanded to walk the straight path and follow God, and those who disbelieve will suffer in Hell.
