= Asadullah =

Male given name

- Pronunciation: Arabic: [ʔasad‿ɑɫˈɫɑh] Persian: [ʔæsædoɫˈɫɒː]
- Gender: Male
- Language: Arabic, Persian

Origin
- Origin: Arabic language
- Meaning: Lion of Allah
- Region of origin: Arabia

Other names
- Alternative spelling: Assadullah, Asadollah, Assadolah, Asad Ullah, Asadallah
- Related names: Asad, Ariel

Asadullāh, Asadollah, Assadullah, or Asad Ullah, is a masculine given name of Arabic origin meaning Lion of God. The name was initially used to refer to the Islamic Prophet Muhammad's closest kinsmen, Hamza ibn Abd al-Muttalib and Ali ibn Abi Talib. Initially, the title was first given to Hamza ibn Abd al-Muttalib, Muhammad's uncle. After the Battle of the Trench, when Ali defeated Amr ibn Abd al-Wud, Muhammad reportedly gave Ali the name Asadullah (Lion of God) and praised him, saying 'Ali's strike on Amr ibn Abd al-Wud is greater than the worship of both mankind and jinn until the Day of Judgement.' Notable people with the name include:

== Given name ==
=== Asad Ullah ===
- Asad Ullah Khan, Indian microbiologist, biochemist, and professor

=== Assad Ullah ===
- Assad Ullah Shah (1926–2004), Indian politician

=== Assad-Allah ===
- Assad-Allah Imani (born 1947), Iranian Shia cleric

=== Asadollah ===
- Asadollah Abbasi (born 1961), Iranian politician
- Asadollah Alam (1919–1978), Iranian politician
- Asadollah Asadi (born 1972), Iranian diplomat
- Asadollah Asgaroladi (1934–2019), Iranian businessman
- Asadollah Azimi (born 1959), Iranian Paralympian athlete
- Asadollah Badamchian (born 1942), Iranian journalist and politician
- Asadollah Bayat-Zanjani (born 1942), Iranian theologian
- Asadollah Nasr Esfahani (1927–2026), Iranian military officer and politician
- Asadollah Lajevardi (1935–1998), Iranian politician and prison warden
- Asadollah Mahini (1918–??), Iranian weightlifter
- Asadollah Malek (1942–2002), Iranian violinist and composer
- Asadollah Mobasheri (1909–1990), Iranian judge, politician, journalist, poet, and translator
- Asadollah Mousavi, Iranian politician
- Asadollah Sanii (1904–1998), Iranian politician
- Asadollah Shirazi (died 1853), Iranian calligrapher

=== Asadulla ===
- Asadulla Al Galib (born 1998), Bangladeshi cricketer
- Asadulla Jafarov (born 1949), Azerbaijani archaeologist and paleontologist
- Asadulla Lachinau (born 1986), Russian-Belarusian freestyle wrestler
- Asadulla Nasipov (born 2001/02), Russian kickboxer

=== Asadullah ===
- Asadullah Bhutto, Pakistani politician
- Asadullah Boroujerdi, Iranian Shia cleric
- Asadullah Hamdam, Afghan politician
- Asadullah Isfahani, Iranian swordsmith
- Asadullah Jan (born 1985), Pakistani Guantanamo detainee
- Asadullah Khalid (born 1970), Afghan politician
- Asadullah Khan (born 1984), Afghan cricketer
- Asadullah Mamaghani (1881–??), Iranian jurist and clergyman
- Asadullah Matani (born 1998), Afghan cricketer
- Asadullah Saadati (born 1974), Afghan politician
- Asadullah Sumari (born 1986), Pakistani cricketer

=== Assadollah ===
- Assadollah Adeli, Iranian fighter pilot
- Assadollah Hosseinpoor (1882/83–1954), Iranian military officer
- Assadollah Rashidian (1919–1980), Iranian businessman and politician

=== Assadullah ===
- Assadullah Amin (died 1979), Afghan politician
- Assadullah Sarwari (born 1941), Afghan politician
- Assadullah Wafa, Afghan politician

== Surname ==
- Khalifa Mohammad Asadullah (1890–1949), Pakistani librarian

== See also ==
- Asad (given name)
- List of Arabic theophoric names
