= Animals in Islam =

Religious stance on attitudes to animals

According to Islam, animals are conscious of God. According to the Quran, they praise Him, even if this praise is not expressed in human language. Baiting animals for entertainment or gambling is prohibited. It is forbidden to kill any animal except for food or to prevent it from harming people.

The Quran explicitly allows the consumption of the meat of certain halal (lawful) animals. Although some Sufis have practised vegetarianism, there has been no serious discourse on the possibility of interpretations of scripture that require vegetarianism. Certain animals can be eaten under the condition that they are slaughtered in a specified way.

== Pre-7th century ==
In the Arabian Peninsula before the advent of Islam in the 7th century CE, Arabs, like other people, attributed the qualities and the faults of humans to animals. Virility, for example, was attributed to the cock; perfidy to the monkey; stupidity to the lizard; and boldness to the elephant.

Based on the facts that the names of certain tribes bear the names of animals, survivals of animal cults, prohibitions of certain foods and other indications, W. R. Smith argued for the practice of totemism by certain pre-Islamic tribes of Arabia. Others have argued that this evidence may only imply the practice of a form of animalism. In support of this, for example, it was believed that upon one's death, the soul departs from the body in the form of a bird (usually a sort of owl); the soul-as-bird then flies about the tomb for some time, occasionally crying out (for vengeance).

== Human duties in utilizing animals ==
According to Islam, human beings are allowed to use animals, but only if the rights of the animals are respected. The owner of an animal must do everything to benefit the animal. If the owner fails to perform their duties for the animal, the animal goes to someone else. The duties humans have to animals in Islam are based in the Quran, Sunnah and traditions.

=== Protection of animals' physical health ===
Harming, disabling, injuring, or cutting out the organs from any animal is strongly prohibited. Muslims may not cut the forelock, mane, or tail of a horse, because it is believed there is goodness in its forelock; its mane provides it warmth and it swats insects away with its tail.

=== Protection of animals' sexual health ===
Muslims are not allowed to perform acts such as the interbreeding (as in inbreeding) of animals. Muhammad forbade people from castrating animals.

=== Preventing cruelty and maltreatment to animals ===
Muslims are not allowed to harass and misuse animals, which includes snatching a leaf from an ant's mouth. Muslims have no right to brand animals, hamstring or crucify animals before killing, or burn animals even if they cause harm to humans. Humans should obtain animal meat by a swift slaughter and avoid cutting lengthwise. In Islamic slaughter, the spinal cord cannot be broken.

=== Avoiding punishment of animals ===
Muslims cannot use any equipment that injures an animal, (i.e., beating them in a circus show, forcing them to carry heavy loads, or running at extreme speeds in races) even to train them. Exposure to sound is also regulated.

=== Providing food ===
Muslims are obliged to provide food and water for any animal they see, even if the animal does not belong to them. In providing food and water considerations are the quality of the provisions and the amount of the provision based on the animal's condition and location.

=== Providing sanitation ===
Animals' health must be respected, along with food, water, and shelter.

=== Providing medication ===
In the event of illness, Muslims are expected to pay for the care and medication.

=== Providing dwelling ===
From an Islamic view, the appropriate shelter for an animal has three characteristics:

- Fits the animal's needs and they should not be placed in an unsanitary condition on the pretext that they do not understand.
- Fits the physical needs of the animal and its health and protect it from cold and heat.
- The dwelling of animals should not pollute the environment or spread disease to other organisms.

=== Respecting animal of status ===
In Islam, the rights of animals are respected in both life and death. Animal bodies may never be used for malicious purposes.

== Quran ==
Although over two hundred verses in the Qur'an deal with animals and six Quranic chapters (surah) are named after animals, animal life is not a predominant theme in the Qur'an. The Qur'an teaches that God created animals from water. God cares for all his creatures and provides for them. All creation praises God, even if this praise is not expressed in human language. God has prescribed laws for each species (laws of nature). Since animals follow the laws God has ordained for them, they are to be regarded as "Muslim", just as a human who obeys the laws prescribed for humans (Islamic law) is a Muslim. Just like humans, animals form "communities". In verse 6:38, the Qur'an applies the term ummah, generally used to mean "a human religious community", for genera of animals. The Encyclopaedia of the Qur'an states that this verse has been "far reaching in its moral and ecological implications."

There is not an animal (that lives) on the earth, nor a being that flies on its wings, but (forms part of) communities like you. Nothing have we omitted from the Book, and they (all) shall be gathered to their Lord in the end.

The Qur'an says that animals benefit humans in many ways and that they are aesthetically pleasing to look at. This is used as proof of God's benevolence towards humans. Animals that are slaughtered in accordance with sharia may be consumed. According to many verses of the Qur'an, the consumption of pork is sinful, unless there is no alternative other than starving to death (in times, for example, of war or famine). Surat Yusuf of the Quran mentions that a reason why Ya'qub was reluctant to let his son Yusuf to play in the open, even in the presence of his brothers, was that a dhiʾb (Arabic: ذِئْب, lit. 'wolf') could eat him.

The Quran contains three mentions of dogs:

- Verse 5:4 says "Lawful for you are all good things, and [the prey] that trained [hunting] dogs and falcons catch for you."
- Verse 18:18 describes the Companions of the Cave, a group of saintly young men presented in the Qurʼan as exemplars of religion, sleeping with "their dog stretching out its forelegs at the threshold." Further on, in verse 22, the dog is always counted as one of their numbers, no matter how they are numbered. In Muslim folklore, affectionate legends have grown around the loyal and protective qualities of this dog, whose name in legend is Qiṭmīr.

The above verses are seen as portraying dogs positively. Nevertheless, Islamic scholars have tended to regard dogs' saliva as impure; practically, this means anything licked by a dog necessitates washing. Many Islamic jurists allowed owning dogs for herding, farming, hunting, or protection, but prohibited ownership for reasons they regarded as "frivolous".

There is a whole chapter in the Quran named "The Ants". As a result, the killing of ants in Sunni Islam is prohibited. Within the aforementioned chapter of "The Ant", there is an account of Sulaymaan (Solomon) talking to the eponymous ant as well as birds, most famously the hoopoe.

The Quran talks about a miraculous She-Camel of God (Arabic: نَـاقَـة, 'she-camel') that came from stone, in the context of the Prophet Salih, Thamudi people and Al-Hijr.

Pork is haram (forbidden) to eat, because its essence is considered impure, this is based on the verse of the Qur'an where it is described as being rijs (Arabic: رِجْس, impure) (Quran 6:145).

Forbidden (haram) is also the meat of domesticated donkeys, mules, any predatory animal with canine teeth and birds with talons.

Verses 50 and 51 of Surat al-Muddaththir in the Quran talk about ḥumur ('asses' or 'donkeys') fleeing from a qaswarah ('lion', 'beast of prey' or 'hunter'), in its criticism of people who were averse to Muhammad's teachings, such as donating wealth to the less wealthy.

The Arabic word meaning "animal" (hayawān/haywān (Arabic: حَيَوَان \ حَيْوَان; plural haywānāt (Arabic: حَيَوَانَات))) appears only once in the Qur'an but in the sense of everlasting life (personal). On the other hand, the term dābbah (Arabic: دَابَّة; plural dawābb), usually translated as "beast" or "creature" to sometimes differentiate from flying birds while surprisingly including humans, occurs a number of times in the Qur'an, while remaining rare in medieval Arabic works on zoology. Animals in the Qur'an and early Muslim thought may usually (though not necessarily) be seen in terms of their relation to human beings, producing a tendency toward anthropocentrism.

== Sunnah ==
Sunnah refers to the traditional biographies of Muhammad wherein examples of sayings attributed to him and his conduct have been recorded. Sunnah consists of hadith (anecdotes about Muhammad).

Animals must not be mutilated while they are alive. Muhammad is also reported (by Ibn Omar and Abdallah bin Al-As) to have said: "there is no man who kills [even] a sparrow or anything smaller, without its deserving it, but God will question him about it [on the judgment day]" and "Whoever is kind to the creatures of God is kind to himself."

Muhammad issued advice to kill animals that were Fawāsiq (Arabic: فَوَاسِق "Harmful ones"), such as the rat and the scorpion, within the haram (holy area) of Mecca. Killing other non-domesticated animals in this area, such as equids and birds, is forbidden.

Muslims are required to sharpen the blade when slaughtering animals to ensure that no pain is felt. Muhammad is said to have said: "For [charity showed to] each creature which has a wet liver [i.e. is alive], there is a reward."

There is a hadith in Muwatta' Imam Malik about Muslim Pilgrims having to beware of the wolf, besides other animals.

Muhammad is also reported as having reprimanded some men who were sitting idly on their camels in a marketplace, saying "either ride them or leave them alone". Apart from that, the camel has significance in Islam. Al Qaswa (Arabic: ٱلْقَصْوَاء) was a female Arabian camel that belonged to Muhammad, and was dear to him. Muhammad rode on Qaswa during the Hijrah ('Migration') from Mecca to Medina, his Hajj in 629 CE, and the Conquest of Mecca in 630. The camel was also present during the Battle of Badr in 624. After the death of the Prophet, the camel is reported to have starved herself to death, refusing to take food from anyone.

In the Nahj al-Balagha, the Shi'a book of the sayings of Ali, an entire sermon is dedicated to praising peacocks. Bees are highly revered in Islam. The structural genius of a bee is thought as due to divine inspiration. Their product honey is also revered as medicine. Killing a bee is considered a great sin.

In Shi'ite ahadith, bats are praised as a miracle of nature.

The wolf may symbolize ferocity. As for the kalb (Arabic: كَلْب, dog), there are different views regarding it. The Sunni Maliki school of Islamic jurisprudence distinguishes between wild dogs and pet dogs, only considering the saliva of the former to be impure; on the other hand, some schools of Islamic law consider dogs as unclean (najis). A widely cited hadith in Sahih Muslim, narrated by Maimuna, reports that the angel Gabriel failed to keep an appointment with Muhammad, explaining that angels do not enter a house in which there is a dog or a picture. Upon discovering a puppy had been sheltering under a cot in the household, Muhammad had it removed. The narration further states that he subsequently ordered the killing of dogs, though he made exceptions for dogs used to guard fields and large gardens. A similar account narrated by Aisha appears in the same collection. These narrations form the primary textual basis for scholarly positions regarding the impurity of dogs, though their authenticity and interpretation remain subjects of debate among Muslim scholars. The historian William Montgomery Watt states that Muhammad's kindness to animals was remarkable, citing an instance of Muhammad while traveling with his army to Mecca in 630 AD, posting sentries to ensure that a female dog and her newborn puppies were not disturbed. Muhammad himself prayed in the presence of dogs and many of his cousins and companions, who were the first Muslims, owned dogs; the Mosque of the Prophet in Medina allowed dogs to frolic about in Muhammad's time and for several centuries afterwards. In "two separate narrations by Abu Hurayrah, the Prophet told his companions of the virtue of saving the life of a dog by giving it water and quenching its thirst. One story referred to a man who was blessed by Allah for giving water to a thirsty dog, the other was a prostitute who filled her shoe with water and gave it to a dog, who had its tongue rolling out from thirst. For this deed she was granted the ultimate reward, the eternal Paradise under which rivers flow, to live therein forever." The Qur'an (Surah 18, verse 9–26) praises the dog for guarding the Seven Sleepers fleeing religious persecution; Islamic scholar Ingrid Mattson thus notes that "This tender description of the dog guarding the cave makes it clear that the animal is good company for believers." Umar, the second Caliph of Islam, said that if a dog was hungry in his kingdom, he would be derelict of his duty. According to the Qur'an the use of hunting dogs is permitted, which is a reason the Maliki school draws a distinction between feral and domesticated dogs―since Muslims can eat game that has been caught in a domesticated dog's mouth, the saliva of a domesticated dog cannot be impure. Abou El Fadl "found it hard to believe that the same God who created such companionable creatures would have his prophet declare them 'unclean'", stating that animosity towards dogs in folk Islam "reflected views far more consistent with pre-Islamic Arab customs and attitudes". Furthermore, "he found that a hadith from one of the most trustworthy sources tells how the Prophet himself had prayed in the presence of his playfully cavorting dogs." According to a story by Muslim ibn al-Hajjaj, black dogs are a manifestation of evil in animal form and the company of dogs voids a portion of a Muslim's good deeds; however, according to Khaled Abou El Fadl, the majority of scholars regard this to be "pre-Islamic Arab mythology" and "a tradition to be falsely attributed to the Prophet". Mattson teaches that for followers of other schools, "there are many other impurities present in our homes, mostly in the form of human waste, blood, and other bodily fluids" and that since it is common for these impurities to come in contact with a Muslim's clothes, they are simply washed or changed before prayer. However, this is not necessary for adherents of the Sunni Maliki school as "jurists from the Sunni Maliki School disagree with the idea that dogs are unclean." Individual fatāwā ("rulings") have indicated that dogs be treated kindly or otherwise released, and earlier Islamic literature often portrayed dogs as symbols of highly esteemed virtues such as self-sacrifice and loyalty, which, in the hands of despotic and unjust rulers, become oppressive instruments.

Big cats like the asad (lion), namir (نَمِر, leopard), and namur (نَمُر, tiger), can symbolize ferocity, similar to the wolf. Apart from ferocity, the lion has an important position in Islam and Arab culture. Men noted for their bravery, like Ali, Hamzah ibn Abdul-Muttalib and Omar Mukhtar, were given titles like "Asad Allāh" ("Lion of God") and "Asad aṣ-Ṣaḥrāʾ" ("Lion of the Desert").

== Muslim cultures ==
Usually, in Muslim-majority cultures, animals have names (one animal may be given several names), which are often interchangeable with the names of people. Muslim names or titles like asad and ghadanfar (Arabic for lion), shir and arslan (Persian and Turkish for lion, respectively) and fahad (which could mean either a cheetah or leopard, however "nimr" is more common for the latter) are frequent in the Muslim world. Prominent Muslims with animal names include Hamzah, Abd al-Rahman ibn Sakhr Al-Dawsi Al-Zahrani (more commonly known by his kunya "Abu Hurairah" or the Father of the kitten), Abdul-Qadir Gilani (called al-baz al-ashhab, the wise falcon) and Lal Shahbaz Qalander of Sehwan (called "red falcon").

Islamic literature has many stories of animals. Arabic and Persian literature boast many animal fables. The most famous, Kalilah wa-Dimnah or Panchatantra, translated into Arabic by Abd-Allāh Ibn al-Muqaffaʿ in the 8th century, was also known in Europe. In the 12th century, Shihab al-Din al-Suhrawadi wrote many short stories about animals. At about the same time, in north-eastern Iran, Attar Neyshapuri (Farid al-Din Attar) composed the epic poem Mantiq al-Tayr (meaning The Conference of the Birds).

In Malaysia in 2016, the Malaysian Islamic Development Department, a religious governing body, prohibited the use of the term hot dog to refer to the food of that name. It asked food outlets selling them to rename their products or risk refusal of halal certification. The term 'pretzel dog' was refused certification, with 'pretzel sausage' considered more appropriate. Per local media, Malaysian halal food guidelines prohibit naming halal products after non-halal products. Islamist organization Hamas which controls the Gaza Strip, banned dog walking in public areas such as markets and beaches in May 2017. The ban was in response to a rise in dog ownership and dog walking in busy areas.

== Ritual slaughter ==
UK animal welfare organizations have decried some ritual methods of slaughter practiced in Islam (dhabihah) and Judaism (shechita) as inhumane and causing "severe suffering". According to Judy MacArthur Clark, chairwoman of the Farm Animal Welfare Council, cattle require up to two minutes to bleed to death when halal or kosher means of slaughter are used on cattle: "This is a major incision into the animal and to say that it doesn't suffer is quite ridiculous." In response, Majid Katme of the Muslim Council of Britain stated that "[i]t's a sudden and quick haemorrhage. A quick loss of blood pressure and the brain is instantaneously starved of blood and there is no time to start feeling any pain."

In permitting dhabiha, the German Constitutional Court cited the 1978 study led by Professor Wilhelm Schulze at the University of Veterinary Medicine Hanover which concluded that "[t]he slaughter in the form of ritual cut is, if carried out properly, painless in sheep and calves according to the EEG recordings and the missing defensive actions." Muslims and Jews have also argued that traditional British methods of slaughter have meant that "animals are sometimes rendered physically immobile, although with full consciousness and sensation. Applying a sharp knife in shechita and dhabh, by contrast, ensures that no pain is felt: the wound inflicted is clean, and the loss of blood causes the animal to lose consciousness within seconds."

== Animals in Islamic art ==
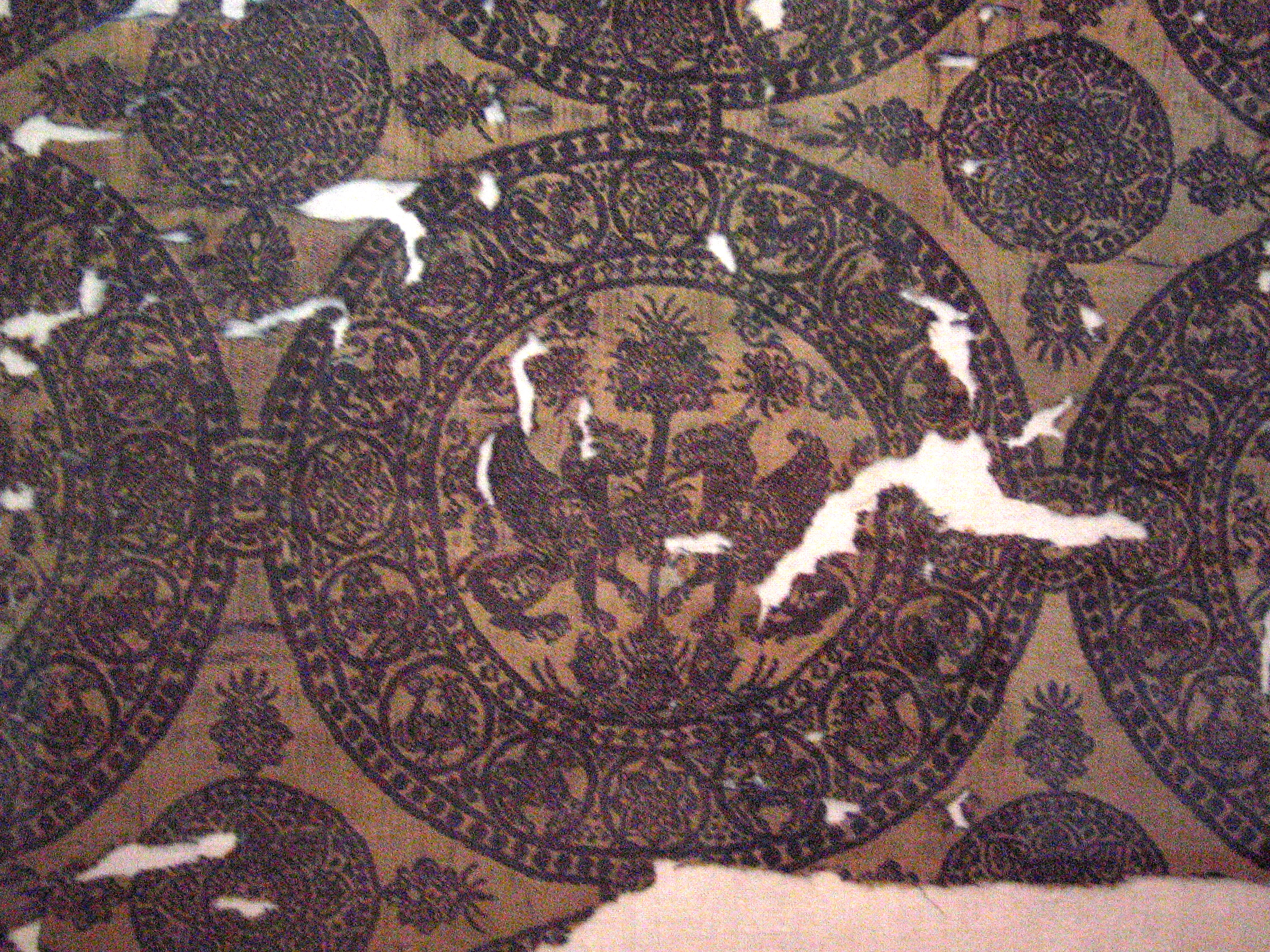
Title: Double-face textile with a tree of life & a winged lion Description: Rayy (Iran). Early Islamic Period. Silk

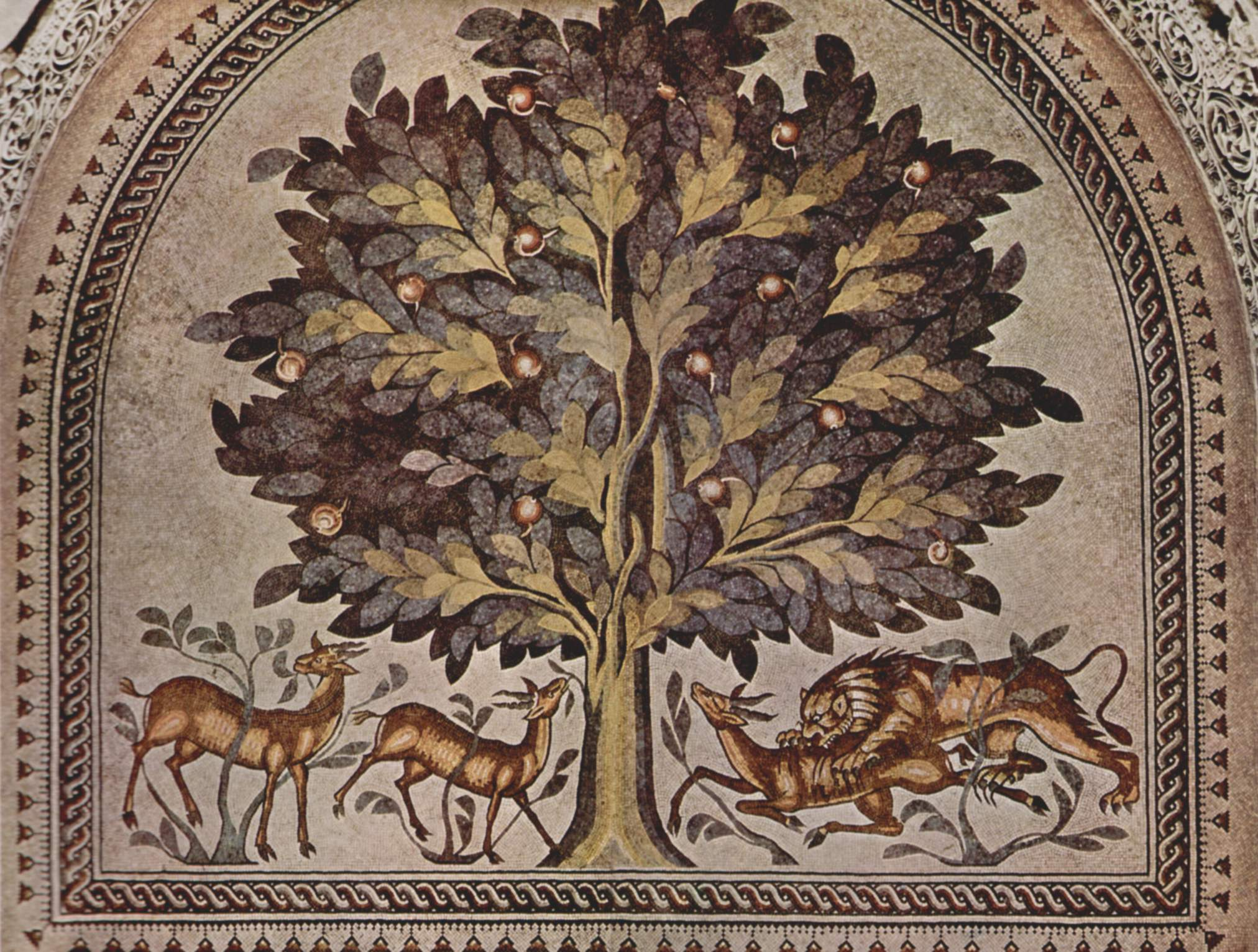
Title: Tree of Life, Khirbat al-Mafjar. Description: Jordan. Early Islamic Period, 8th century. Mosaic.

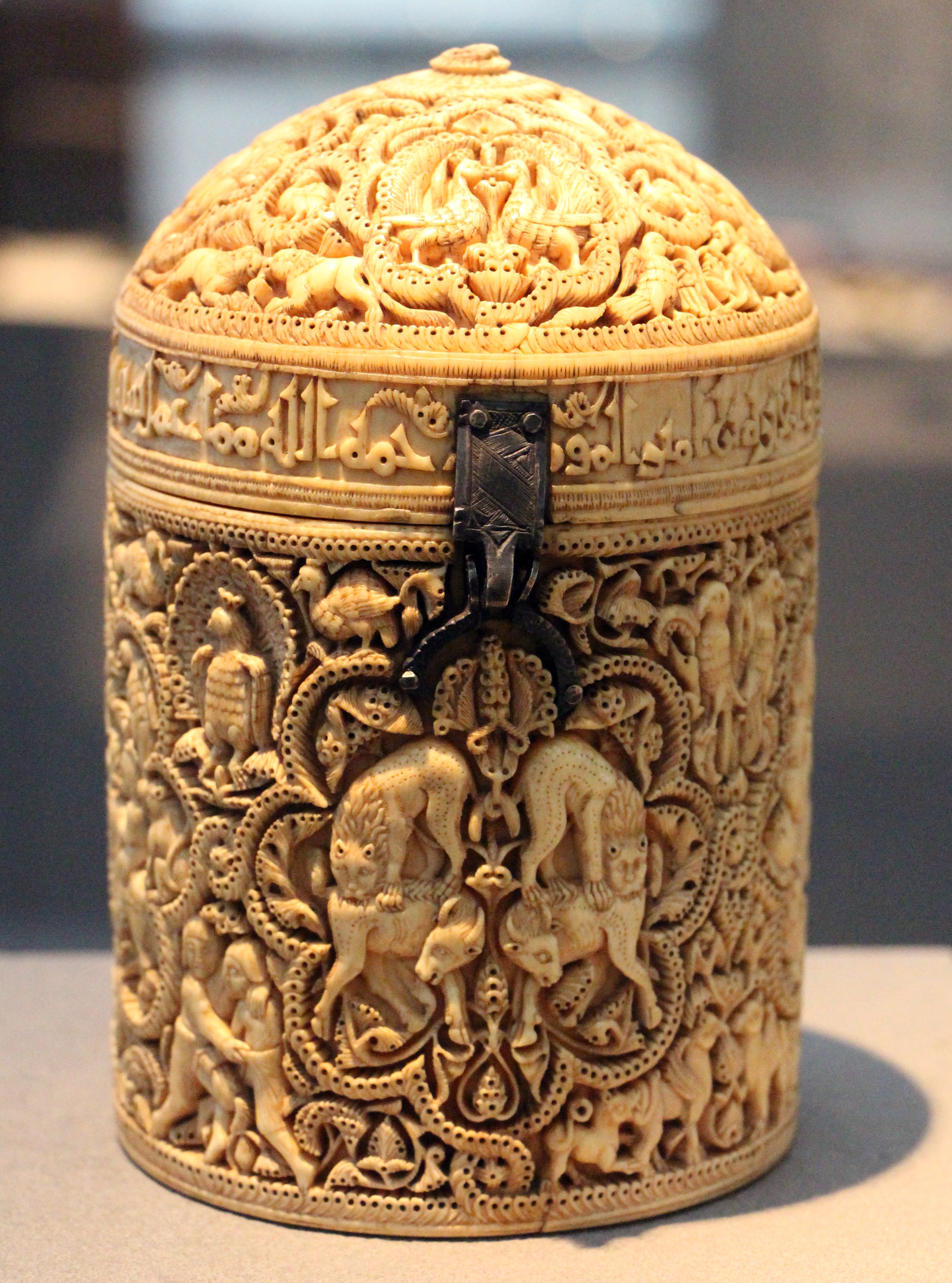
Title: Pyxis of al Mughira Description: Made at the Royal Workshop at Madinat al-Zahra, Spain for Prince al-Mughira. Hispano Umayyad, 968 CE.

The depiction of animals serve numerous functions in Islamic art. Various animal motifs may work to serve as symbolic metaphors for human beings in a variety objects but their use may vary a great degree from object to object ultimately dependent upon context in which these figures are situated in. The depiction of animals may also serve the purpose of being decorative motifs, examples of the use of animals for decorative purposes can be found in textiles, ceramics, metal work, mosaics, and in general, a wide spectrum of Islamic artistic mediums. Furthermore, depictions of animals in Islam can potentially be a combination of both decorative and symbolic in their respective usage, e.g. royal tapestries with animal motifs used to cover furniture such as the "Double-Face Textile with a Tree of Life & a Winged Lion," hailing from Rayy, Iran circa the Early Islamic Period. In the instance of the "Double-Face Textile with a Tree of Life and a Winged Lion," the use of lions can serve as a great study for reoccurring animal motifs which are used as a representational link between the symbolic power of the lion in nature and the sultan's power. Which in term demonstrates a dual use in visually portraying a lions.

Many animals are often represented alongside "vegetal" (Arabesque) patterns and are often found in an adorsed position (represented twice, symmetrically, and often side by side). Often we can find these adorsed or flanking animals surrounding an actual visual representation of a tree, this seems to be a common motif. The "Tree of Life" mosaic found at the desert palace of Khirbat al-Mafjar built under Caliph Walid II's rule during the Umayyad period, is perhaps one of the most well known mosaics depicting animals in figural form in the Islamic world. This particular mosaic was found in a private room of the desert palace which served as a bathhouse complex for the purpose of leisure. There is no religious context to this particular mosaic which explains the figural depictions of animals, under a religious context we would not see such figural depictions due to aniconism in the Islamic faith. In this mosaic we see a lion attacking a gazelle on the right side of the mosaic, and on the left side we see a depiction of two other gazelles casually grazing. Although there are multiple interpretations of this mosaic, one major interpretation seems to be that the actual physical depiction of the tree of life is a metaphor for the great and vast knowledge growing from the Islamic world. The lion attacking the gazelle is a borrowed motif from previous civilizations that is meant to represent Islam and the Islamic caliphates power as continuing the legacy of the great civilizations the preceded them (e.g. Mesopotamia). Another main interpretation is that this mosaic was a private erotic piece of art that depicted the caliphates sexual prowess, seeing as it was located in a private room of the bath complex. The entanglement of branches on the trees bearing fruit, the female gazelles grazing by the tree, and of course the lion (a stand in for the sultan) taking down his "prey" (a sole female gazelle), are all a testament to the sultan's (Walid II) reputation and exploits, which were well documented in the sultan's own writings.

Live animals or trophy pieces of deceased animals would sometimes be gifted to royal courts from one sultan to another sultan in the Islamic world. In some instances, this exchange of animals as gifts would come from outside the Islamic world as well. For example of Charlemagne gifting a sultan a live elephant. In many instances, we can observe these acquired pieces of animals such as ivory tusks, being repurposed, not only as a trophies but as a decorations. A great example of the aforementioned is "The Pyxis of al-Mughira," made at the Royal Workshop at Madinat al-Zahra, Spain, This Ivory Casket was gifted to the prince for the purpose of serving as a decorative piece with a nefarious political connotation behind it. Perhaps most interesting is that these caskets would be intricately carved from ivory, and depict various animal motifs, in various relations to pleasure, power, etc. Once again these pieces were not anionic for they were meant to be displayed in palaces or in private quarters. They did not have religious connotations behind them. Upon viewing "The Pyxis of al-Mughira" we see the adorned animals figures depicted time and time again in Islamic art. We can observe, two bulls, two men on horses, and of course two lions attacking stags. This ivory casket also depicts numerous birds, two men engaged in wrestling, what is presumed to be the sultan and his sons, musicians, the vegetal or arabesque pattern we have previously seen in other examples of Islamic art carved throughout the entirety of this casket, and a tiraz band across the upper area of the casket which serves as the aforementioned political warning.

The general overarching idea of the examples given above are that the use of animals as symbolic representations of humans, royal accoutrements, symbolic representations of power, etc. were not necessarily exclusive in their use. Instead, they could cross the entire gamut in terms of art and culture. There is a multitude of usage and meanings in the depiction of animals in Islamic art. The context could range from political, religious, decorative, etc. These animal representations in the Islamic are not static and tell countless stories.

== See also ==
- Animal theology
- Qurbani
- Sulayman and animals
- Yunus and the Nun
- Legal aspects of ritual slaughter
- Animal sacrifice
- The Case of the Animals versus Man

== Notes ==
- Masri, Al-Hafiz Basheer Ahmad (1993). Animal Welfare in Islam. Islamic Foundation. ISBN 0-86037-411-4.
- El Fadl, Khaled Abou (2004). Encyclopedia of Religion and Nature, s.v. "Dogs in the Islamic Tradition and Nature.". New York: Continuum International.
- Foltz, Richard C. (2006). Animals in Islamic Tradition and Muslim Cultures. Oneworld Publications. ISBN 1-85168-398-4.
- Gill, H. A. R. Shorter Encyclopaedia of Islam. Netherlands: Brill.
- Khan, Tauseef, Honey Bee, in Muhammad in History, Thought, and Culture: An Encyclopedia of the Prophet of God (2 vols.), Edited by C. Fitzpatrick and A. Walker, Santa Barbara, ABC-CLIO, 2014, Vol. I, pp. 263–265. ISBN 1610691776
- Tlili, Sarra, Animals, in Muhammad in History, Thought, and Culture: An Encyclopedia of the Prophet of God (2 vols.), Edited by C. Fitzpatrick and A. Walker, Santa Barbara, ABC-CLIO, 2014, Vol. I, pp. 24–29. ISBN 1610691776
