= President Assad =

President Assad may refer to:

- Hafez al-Assad (1930–2000), 18th president of Syria
- Bashar al-Assad (born 1965), 19th president of Syria and son of the 18th president

== See also ==
- Asad (name)
- Assad (disambiguation)
