= As'ad =

أَسْعَد
- Romanisation: ALA-LC: Asʻad
- Pronunciation: Arabic: [ˈʔasʕad]
- Gender: male
- Language: Arabic

Origin
- Meaning: more/most fortunate, happier/happiest, luckier/luckiest

Other names
- Variant form: Askhat (Асхат) (Kazakh)
- Anglicisations: Asaad, Assaad, Assad, Assadi

As'ad (Arabic: أَسْعَد / ALA-LC: Asʻad, Arabic pronunciation: [ˈʔasʕad]), informally transcribed as Asaad or Assaad, is an Arabic male given name derived from the elative degree of the adjective سَعِيد saʿīd, thus meaning "more/most fortunate, happier/happiest, luckier/luckiest". It also exists as a surname.

== People with the given name ==
- As'ad Abu Karib, king of Himyar from 390 to 440
- As'ad ibn Zurara, companion of Muhammad
- As'ad Pasha al-Azm
- As'ad Syamsul Arifin
- As'ad Shukeiri
- As'ad Adib Bayudh
- As'ad AbuKhalil
- Asaad Kelada
- Assaad Bouab
- Assaad W. Razzouk
- Assaad Taha
- Assaad Seif
- Assaad Feddah
- Assaad Chaftari
- Assaad Andraos
- Assaad Hardan

== People with the surname ==
- Ahmad El-Assaad
- Kamel Asaad
- Khaled al-Asaad, prominent Syrian archaeologist and historian killed by ISIS
- Man Asaad
- Nizar Assaad
- Lucas Assadi
