= Asaduddin =

Asaduddin is a Muslim masculine given name of Arabic origin and may refer to:

- Asad ad-Din Shirkuh (died 1169), Kurdish vizier
- Asaduddin Bahram Khan, medieval Bengali poet and vizier
- Asaduddin Owaisi (born 1969), president of the All India Majlis-e-Ittehadul Muslimeen
- Mohammad Asaduddin (born 1990), Indian cricketer

== See also ==
- Asad
- Uddin
