= Asad =

- Pronunciation: Arabic: [ʔasad]
- Gender: Male

Origin
- Meaning: Lion
- Region of origin: Middle East

Other names
- Alternative spelling: Assad, Asaad
- Related names: Asad al-Din; Asad al-Zaman

Asad (Arabic: أسد), sometimes written as Assad, is an Arabic male given name literally meaning "lion". It is used in nicknames such as Asad Allāh, one of the by-names for Ali ibn Abi Talib.

Notable people named "Asad" or "Assad" include:

== Given name ==
- Asadullah (disambiguation), multiple people
- Asad ibn Abd-al-Uzza, early Islamic historical figure
- Asad Abdul Rahman (born 1944), Palestinian political scientist, academic and politician
- Asad Ahmad, journalist for BBC News and newsreader for BBC London
- Asad Q. Ahmed, American scholar
- Asad Al Faqih (1910–1989), Lebanese lawyer and diplomat
- Asad ibn al-Furat (760–828) jurist and theologian
- Asad ibn Hashim, maternal grandfather of Ali ibn Abi Talib
- Asaduddin Owaisi, Indian politician
- Asad Raza (artist), Pakistani-American artist
- Asad Rustum, Lebanese historian, academic and writer
- Asad ibn Saman, early Samanid
- Assad Saftawi (1935–1993), Palestinian Fatah cofounder and leader
- Asad Shafiq, Pakistan test cricketer
- Asad Umar, Pakistani lawmaker and former politician
- Mohammed Asad Ullah Sayeed, former IAS officer from Hyderabad

== Surname ==
- Audrey Assad, American singer-songwriter and Contemporary Christian music artist
- Clarice Assad, Sérgio's daughter, a classical and jazz composer, arranger, pianist, and vocalist
- Javier Assad (born 1997), Mexican baseball player
- Julio Asad (born 1953), Argentine footballer
- María de Lourdes Dieck-Assad, Lebanese-Mexican economist
- Muhammad Asad, born Leopold Weiss, influential 20th-century writer and political theorist
- Omar Asad (born 1971), Argentine footballer
- Sérgio Assad, Brazilian classical composer, guitarist
- Talal Asad, anthropologist, son of Muhammad Asad
- Yamil Asad (born 1994), Argentine footballer

=== Al-Assad family ===
The Al-Assad family is an Alawite family from the Latakia region (specifically Qardaha), which held political power in Syria between 1970 and 2024. The family has produced two presidents:

- Hafez al-Assad, former President of Syria 1970–2000
- Bashar al-Assad, former President of Syria July 2000 to December 2024

Other family members include:

- Bassel al-Assad
- Rifaat al-Assad
- Jamil al-Assad
- Maher al-Assad
- Bushra al-Assad

== See also ==
- Asad (disambiguation)
- Asadi (disambiguation)
- Aslan (disambiguation)
- Al Asad Airbase
- Haydar
- Lions in Islam
- Qaswarah
- Shir, a Persian term for 'Lion'
