= Asadi =

Asadi, or Assadi is an Arabic surname. Notable people with the surname include:

- Ali Akbar Ostad-Asadi, Iranian footballer
- Ebrahim Asadi, Iranian footballer
- Houshang Asadi, Iranian journalist
- Mohammed al-Asadi, Yemeni extrajudicial prisoner of the United States
- Morteza Asadi, Iranian footballer
- Lucas Assadi, Chilean footballer

== See also ==
- Asad
