= Nimr =

Nimr, al-Nimr or NIMR may refer to:

== People ==
=== Surname ===
- Ali Mohammed Baqir al-Nimr (born 1994), Saudi Arabian protester sentenced to beheading and crucifixion, but later released, nephew of Nimr al-Nimr
- Amy Nimr (1898–1974), Egyptian-born artist, writer and patron of the arts
- Faris Nimr (1856–1951), Lebanese journalist
- Mek Nimr (died 1846), last mek (king) of the Ja'alin tribe of Shendi, Sudan
- Nimr al-Nimr (1959–2016), Saudi Arabian Shia cleric beheaded for criticizing his country's government
- Sonia Nimr (born 1955), Palestinian writer, storyteller, translator, ethnographer and academic

=== Given name ===
- Nimr Saleh (1929–1991), Palestinian leftist figure

== Other uses ==
- NIMR (vehicle manufacturer)
  - Nimr (armored personnel carrier)
- National Institute for Medical Research, in the UK
- National Institute of Malaria Research, in India
- Nigerian Institute of Medical Research, in Nigeria
- National Institute for Medical Research, in Tanzania

== In fiction ==
- Nelson Institute of Marine Research (NIMR), the main quasi-naval organization in the movie Voyage to the Bottom of the Sea and the TV series

== See also ==
- Al-Nimr Palace, in Nablus, West Bank
- Albu Nimr, a Sunni Arab tribe in Iraq
