= Assads =

Assads may refer to,

- Al-Assad family
- Assads, Morocco

== See also ==
- Assad (disambiguation)
