= Asadullah Isfahani =

17th century Iranian swordsmith

Shamshir minted in 1777/78 with the name of Isfahani.

Asadullah Isfahani also known as Assadullah of Isfahan, and Asad Allāh Iṣfahānī (Persian: اسداله اصفهانی; 17th century), was an Iranian artisan shamshir (English: saber) swordsmith who dedicated a sword to Abbas the Great which was later taken by Nader Shah. He was renowned worldwide in the arts and skill.

Isfahani's work is in well known museum collections including the Metropolitan Museum of Art, and Victoria and Albert Museum. His son, Ismail ibn Asad Allah Isfahani was also a well known swordsmith.
