= Houshang Asadi =

Iranian journalist and writer

- Native name: Persian: هوشنگ اسدی
- Born: 1951 (age 74–75) Iran
- Notable works: Letters to My Torturer: Love, Revolution, and Imprisonment in Iran
- Spouse: Nooshabeh Amiri

Houshang Asadi (Persian: هوشنگ اسدی; born 1951) is an Iranian journalist and writer.

== Life ==
He was a member of the Tudeh Party of Iran. During his time in prison, under duress he confessed to being an agent of the SAVAK (Persian: ساواک, short for سازمان اطلاعات و امنیت کشور Sāzmān-e Ettelā'āt va Amniyat-e Keshvar, National Intelligence and Security Organization) the secret police, domestic security and intelligence service established by Iran's Shah, Mohammad Reza Pahlavi.

He was jailed during the reign of Shah Mohammad Reza Pahlavi, and in 1974, with Ali Khamenei:

On a cold winter day in 1975, I was about to be transferred from the cell we'd been sharing. [Khamenei], who was very thin, was shaking. I was wearing a sweater, which I took off and gave to him. He first resisted and didn't want to take it. When he finally accepted it and put it on, we hugged each other. He cried and told me, "Houshang, when Islam will come to power, not a single tear will be shed."

He was a deputy editor of Kayhan newspaper until 1979. After the establishment of the Islamic Revolution he was forced to leave his job. Then he wrote some books including "Nan" (Bread). In 1981, he was arrested, imprisoned in Moshtarek prison, and sentenced to death, and then to 15 years in prison. He was kept in solitary confinement for more than 2 years, and during this period he was tortured so badly as to attempt suicide.

He was freed after 6 years, and then he translated books by Llosa and Márquez. He was a member of the Writers Association of Iran and the Syndicate of the Iranians Journalists, and co-founder of the Association of Iranian Film Critics and Script Writers. He was chief editor of the film magazine called Gozaresh-e-Film.

However, he was put under pressure by Islamic republic agents, and forced to leave Iran in 2003, fearing for his life. Now he lives in France, where he has written his latest book: Letters to my Torturer: Love, Revolution And Imprisonment in Iran. (Oxford: One World Publication). His torturer, "Brother Hamid", became Iranian ambassador to Tajikistan, but after the publication of the book, was recalled into retirement.

He co-founded the Persian-language news website Roozonline.

He is married to Nooshabeh Amiri.

== Works ==
ٍ English:

- Letters to My Torturer: Love, Revolution, and Imprisonment in Iran. Oneworld Publications. 2010. ISBN 978-1-85168-750-3.

Persian:

- Nan (Bread; short story collection). Teheran. 1359 [1980]
- Gorbe (Cat; a novel). Sweden, Nashr-e Baran. 1386 (2007), 303 p.

== Reviews for Letters to My Torturer ==
There are some bumps in the narrative—it is not clear at some points when Mr. Asadi is addressing Brother Hamid, for instance, and whether some passages were written on command, as part of his elaborate "confession" in jail, or some years later in Paris.... Nevertheless, Mr. Asadi has offered the world a powerful testament to what transpires in the prisons of Iran—a nightmare that the country's radical Islamic leadership clearly would be only too happy to export.

Asadi elliptically maps his trajectory from bright-eyed political idealist to a man so broken he once drank what he thought was a bottle of bleach left in his cell in an attempt to end his life, blending in fragments of recent Iranian political history. Asadi's 'decade of intense horror' ended in 1989 when he was released but for many more it surely continues.
