= Asadollah Mousavi =

Iranian politician

Seyyed Asadollah Mousavi

Senator of Senate of Iran
- In office 8 September 1975 – 1978
- Preceded by: Ashraf Ahmadi
- Constituency: Khuzestan Province

Member of National Consultative Assembly
- In office ?–?
- Constituency: Susangerd

Seyyed Assadollah Mousavi (Persian: سید اسدالله موسوی); was a senator and member of the National Consultative Assembly. Mousavi ran for the National Assembly for the first time, from Dasht-e Mishan, Bani-Tarf and Susangard constituencies on February 20, 1980. Mousavi could receive 10,362 votes. He also was the elected senator of Khuzestan.

== Death ==
Seyed Asadullah Mousavi, was killed in his detention center in Behbahan on July 12 th 1979.
