= Assaad Taha =

Egyptian journalist and filmmaker

- Born: 1956 (age 69–70); Suez, Egypt
- Occupations: Playwright and filmmaker
- Employer: Hot Spot Films
- Website: assaadtaha.com

Assaad Taha (Arabic: أسعد طه, born February 1, 1956) is an international award-winning Egyptian playwright and filmmaker. He began his career in writing, soon after moving over to radio and television. Reporting became the main medium in which he chose to cover areas of conflict, before specialising in documentary filmmaking.

== Life and work ==
Taha was born in Suez, Egypt. He grew up in Egypt until the age of 26, when he emigrated to Germany. He lived in Germany for over 10 years as a freelance print journalist before moving to report from conflict zones. Taha wrote for several Arab newspapers, most notably Al Hayat, Asharq Al-Awsat, Al-Ahram and Huffington Post Arabic, along with weekly as well as monthly magazines such as Al Majalla and Al Wasat. Taha has also reported for Arab Radio in Paris and other major television networks including: MBC, Al Jazeera, Al Araby TV and Saudi television.

== War reporting ==
During the 1990s and onwards, Assaad Taha reported from many conflict zones in the former Yugoslavia, Chechnya, southern Sudan, Somalia, Albania and Congo. It was mainly the Balkans and Central Asia that gained his attention .

== Bosnia and Herzegovina ==
Taha became the first to bring Bosnia and Herzegovina, a region that had been largely unknown in the Middle East, to the Arab reader and viewer through the Kuwaiti Al Mugatmah magazine, the Al Alam of London and later through the major Arab international newspapers Hayat and Al Sharq al Awsat. As he was the only Arab broadcast journalist residing in Bosnia, he worked with MBC (the first Arab satellite channel).

Taha led several exclusive stories, including reporting on the Sarajevo tunnel which served as the lifeline of the besieged city at the time and was also the first to report on the counter-attacks by Bosnian forces that led to the lifting of the siege in Sarajevo.

Taha met several times with the Bosnian President, Alija Izetbegović, along with numerous military leaders, allowing him to provide distinctive coverage from the frontlines. He also reported on the growing refugee camps. During and after the war in Bosnia, Taha travelled to and covered extensively neighbouring countries such as Croatia, Serbia, Albania and Kosovo. On 11 August 1997, two years after the war ended in Bosnia, Taha was requested by The International Court of Justice in The Hague for his testimony on what he had witnessed and reported on during the war.

== Chechnya ==
Despite attempts and pressure by the Russian authorities to bar Arab journalists from entry, Taha succeeded in reaching Grozny, the capital. He filed reports from the capital and visited several areas and frontlines in Chechnya. Taha met with Arab fighters in their military camps. He also met and interviewed the Chechen President, Aslan Maskhadov, who was the leader of the resistance, before he was assassinated by the Russian troops. Taha met with Russian prisoners and did extensive coverage on young Chechen fighters and their training camps. Taha also reported on the fall of the city of Shali to the Russians. Taha traveled to Chechnya twice; on his third visit he was detained in Nalchik by Russian authorities, and later released.

== Rwanda and Congo ==
Taha reported from Rwanda towards the end of the Civil War between the Tutsis and Hutus. Taha also covered the concentration camps that were part of the genocide in which an estimated million people were massacred. Taha then traveled to the Congo, which was then called Zaire. He was embedded with the opposition forces that were fighting to overthrow the ruling regime in Kinshasa. He also reported from the front lines in the forest. In Kinshasa, Taha covered the ongoing conflict; at one point in which he was trapped along with other foreign journalists in the main hotel. His reports continued to be broadcast as cities fell under the control of the opposition.

== Documentary ==
Taha produced, directed and presented his popular programme Hot Spot Films on the news channel Al-Jazeera from 1997 until 2013, a programme which focused on conflict zones across the world.

From 2002-2007, Taha also presented and produced for the same channel, Once Upon a Time, a series which covered historical and humanitarian issues that were told in the form of folklore tales. The programme was a combination of literature, history and politics.

The programme, The Journey, aired on Al-Arabi TV from London, was a compilation of bio-documentary series exploring over 25 years of Taha's memories and experiences in covering conflict and political issues around the world. The series also showed behind-the-scenes footage. Taha produced and presented the 13 episodes.

In 2001 Assaad Taha founded his company, Hot Spot Films, which produced and directed award-winning programmes and documentaries, in Dubai. The first of its kind in the region, Hot Spot Films quickly became reputable and known as the most prestigious institution of documentary film making across the Middle East and North Africa.

Taha led the documentary industry in the region, covering over 80 countries, some in the most remote corners of the world.

Taha exposed his audience to cultures and languages that were becoming extinct, along with social and political issues that were ignored by mainstream media. It resulted in him later gaining international recognition for his work. His company's work formed the backbone of the documentary department of Al Jazeera, producing 25 series of documentary films and programmes from 2001 until the present.

== Awards and honours ==
Taha and his production company have received the following awards:

- 1997: Best Documentary Program in Cairo Festival for Radio and Television.
- 2006: Best Documentary Program for the film Eldorado, Kazan International Festival of Muslim Cinema, Russia.
- 2007: Best Documentary Program for The Seven Tents Kazan International Festival of Muslim Cinema, Russia.
- 2010: Honoured by Festival Doc MIP Cannes Film Festival.
- 2014: Honoured by Festival Europe-Orient du Film documentaire à Asilah, Morocco.

== Activities ==
2010: Jury Member of Kazan International Muslim Film Festival.

2010: Emmy Jury The International Academy of Television Arts & Sciences.

2012: Emmy Jury The International Academy of Television Arts & Sciences.

2013: Emmy Jury The International Academy of Television Arts & Sciences.

2014: Emmy Jury The International Academy of Television Arts & Sciences.

2016: Emmy Jury The International Academy of Television Arts & Sciences.
