= Mohammed Asad Ullah Sayeed =

Mohammed Asad Ullah Sayeed محمد اسد اللہ سعید
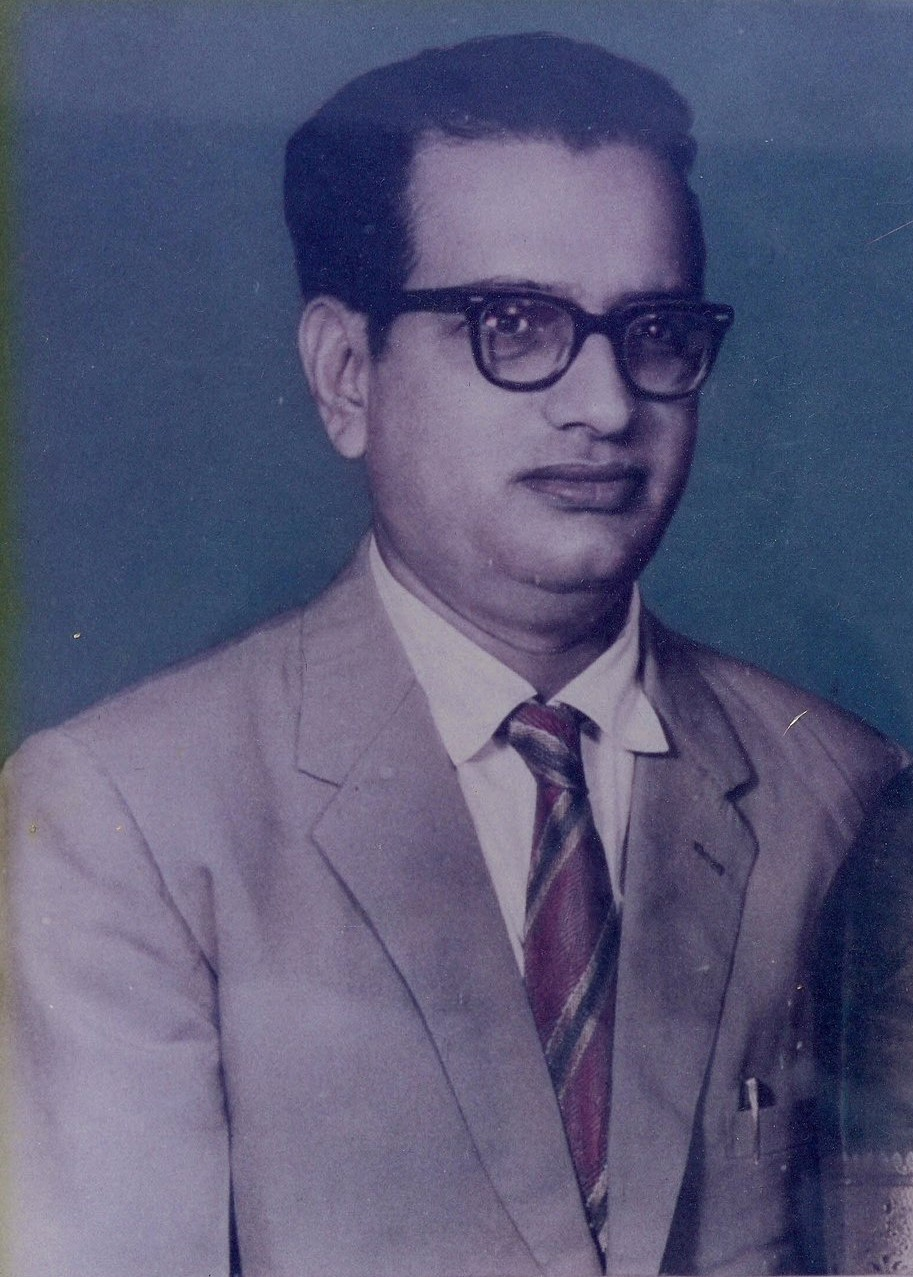

IAS officer
- In office 1950–1978

Personal details
- Born: Mohammed Asad Ullah Sayeed; 6 October 1918 Hyderabad, India
- Education: Osmania University, Hyderabad

Mohammed Asad Ullah Sayeed (6 October 1918 – 18 March 1997) was an IAS officer with government of Andhra Pradesh from 1950 to 1978 and former founding chairman of the National Association Of Muslims (NAM), a charitable organisation based in Hyderabad, India. He served as district collector of Mahbubnagar, Khammam and East Godawari districts of the then undivided state of Andhra Pradesh.

== Early life ==
Mohammed Asad Ullah Sayeed was born in Hyderabad, Telangana (former undivided Andhra Pradesh). His father Mohammad Habib Ullah Sayeed and Ayesha Begum Sayeed were from a prominent family of Navayets from Hyderabad of whom were several officers under the Nizam's government of Hyderabad state like Hasnuddin Ahmed, father of Allahuddin Ahmed, who was the City Police Commissioner of Hyderabad and later Director of Police Commissioner of Nizam state of Hyderabad. Another was Aziz Yar Jung who was an officer under the government of the Nizams of Hyderabad state.

He died on 18 March 1997 in Hyderabad.

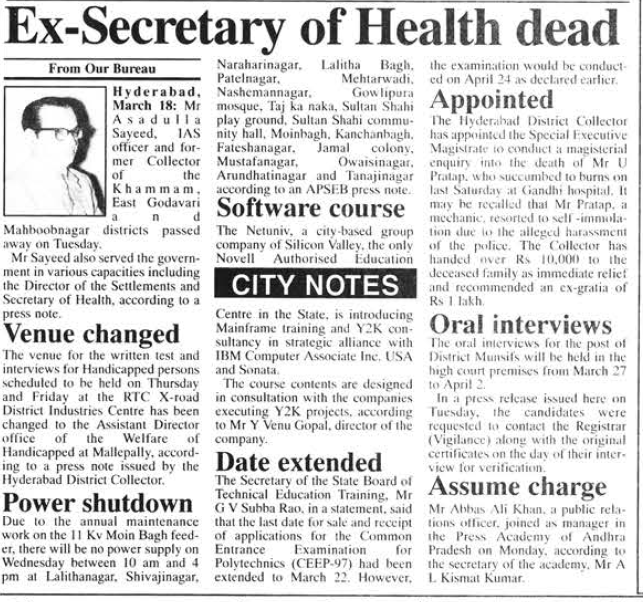
Announcement

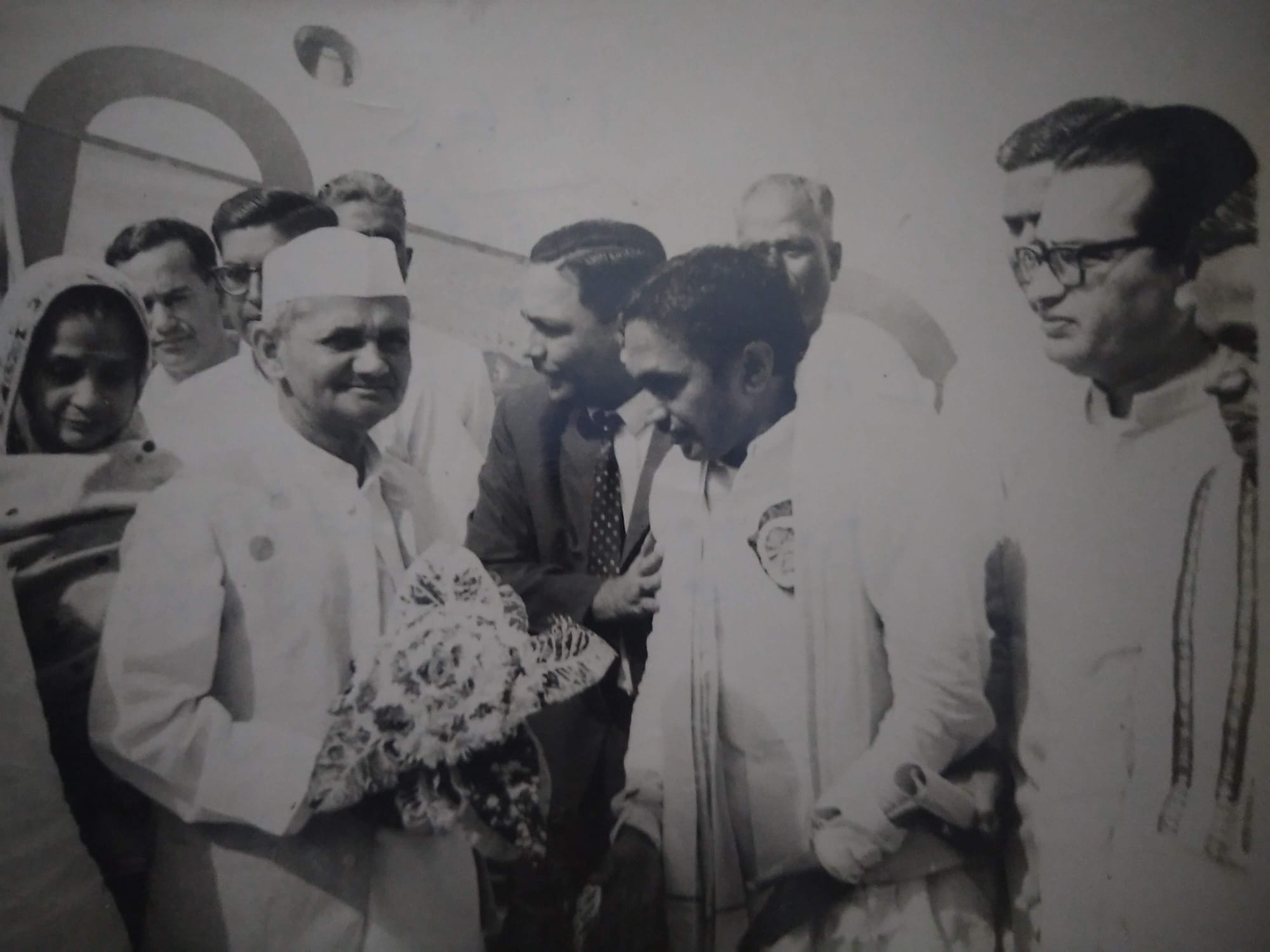
Asadullah Sayeed(Second from right) with PM Lal Bahadur Shastri

== Other work ==
Asad Ullah Sayeed was the founding Chairman of Hyderabad-based NAM foundation which is a charitable organization for upliftment of muslims.
