= Asadollah Shirazi =

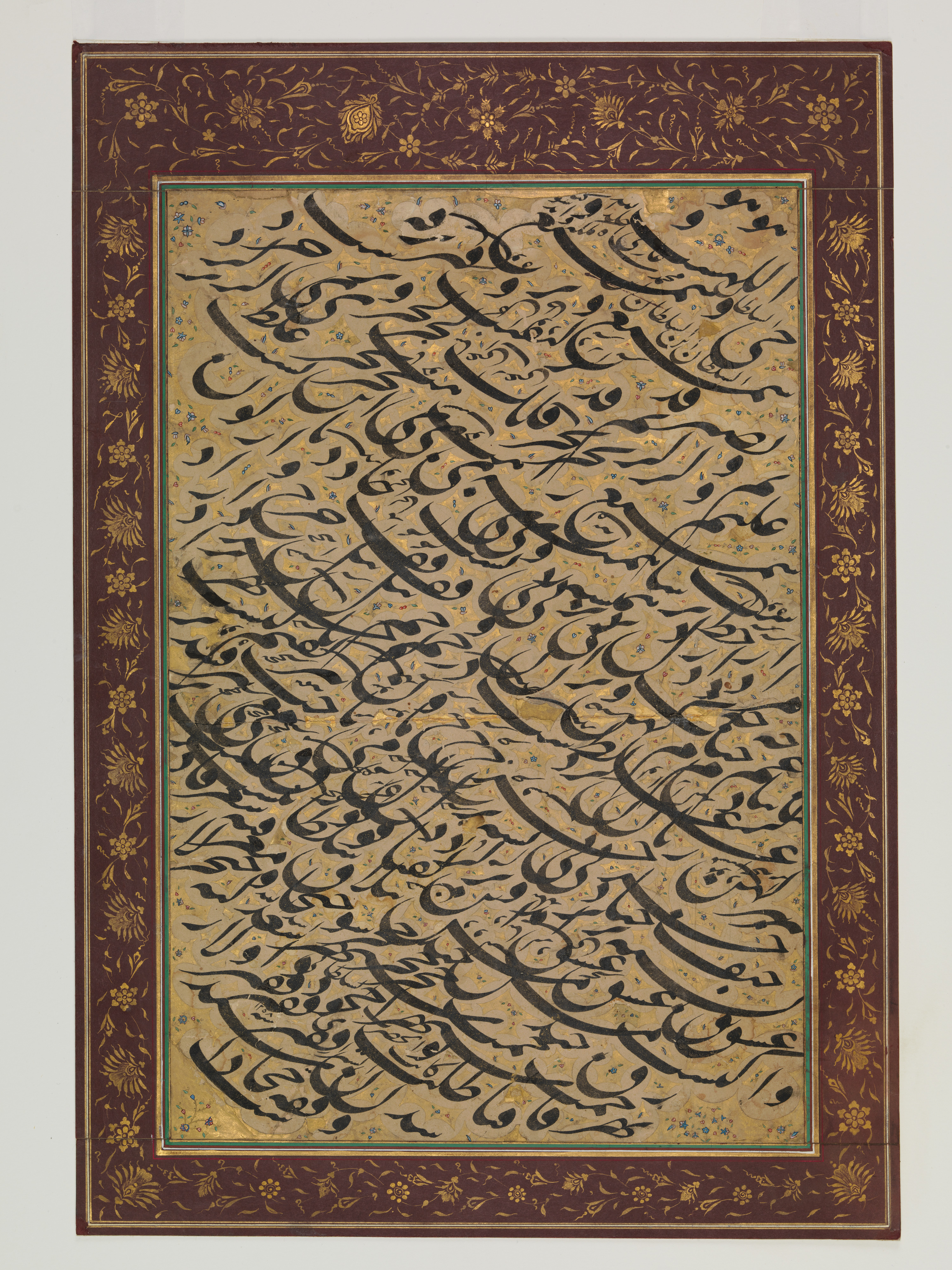
Persian calligraphy by Asadollah Shirazi, dated 1842/43

Asadollah Shirazi (Persian: اسدالله شیرازی; died 1853) was an Iranian calligrapher of the nastaliq style, who served in the court of Mohammad Shah Qajar (r. 1834–1848).

== Sources ==
- Samsar, Mohammad Hasan (2019). "اسدالله شیرازی". The Great Islamic Encyclopaedia (in Persian).
