= Nizar Assaad =

Canadian engineer

- نزار أسعد
- Born: 1948 (age 77–78); Syria
- Occupation: Businessman
- Organization(s): LEAD Contracting & Treading Ltd. (former founder and chairman)

Nizar Assaad (Arabic: نزار أسعد) is a Canadian construction engineer of Syrian origin residing in Beirut, Lebanon and Dubai, UAE. He was the Founder and Chairman of LEAD Contracting & Treading Ltd until his retirement in March 2020.

== Biography ==
Assaad was born in Syria in 1948. He was the Founder and Chairman of LEAD Contracting & Treading Ltd until his retirement in March 2020.

LEAD specializes in building infrastructure of oil and gas. This includes treatment plants, power plants, pipelines and other oil and gas and petrochemical facilities, with strong expertise in electro-mechanical construction services and large-scale civil construction and engineering projects. The company is registered in Jebel Ali Free Zone in UAE.

In 2023, the EU lifted sanctions against Nizar Assaad. The General Court of the EU ruled that the sanctions were not factually justified and breached general principles of EU law.

== Personal life ==
He has been residing between Beirut and Dubai since late 2011. He is married and has four children.
