= Asadullah Boroujerdi =

Iranian Ayatollah (d. 1892)

Asadullah Boroujerdi (Persian: اسدالله بروجردی) was a prominent 19th century Muslim Shia clergy member born in the city of Boroujerd.

== Children ==
His eldest child was Mirza Dawood. His other three children were Mirza Ziaeddin, Mirza Askari and Mirza Mohammad Mehdi. All were among the prominent clerics of their time. Boroujerdi married the daughter of scholar Mirza Qomi and had three children with her, Jamaluddin Muhammad, Fakhr al-Din Muhammad and Nureddin Muhammad, all of whom received their highest clergy ranks from Boroujerdi.

== Students ==
During his time, Boroujerd became a center for religious studies, and many students attended his lectures. The following are the names of his most famous disciples:

- Sheikh Abdul Rahim Boroujerdi
- Sheikh Muhammad Rahimi Boroujerdi
- Syed Zia-ud-Din Boroujerdi
- Morteza Ansari
- Mullah Ahmad Khansari
- Mulla Muhammad Taqi Gulpaigani
- Agha Bozorg Tehrani
- Muhammad Hasan Ashtiyani
