= Anatolia Swimming Complex =

Swimming centre in Aleppo, Syria

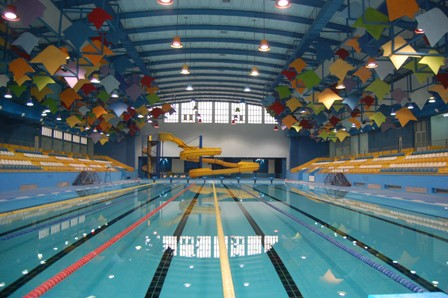
- Interactive map of Anatolia Swimming Complex
- Location: Aleppo, Syria
- Coordinates: 36°12′48″N 37°07′30″E
- Owner: Government of Syria
- Operator: Ministry of Sports and Youth
- Capacity: 1,100

Construction
- Opened: 1998
- Cost: US$ 10 million (re-construction)

Anatolia Swimming Complex (Arabic: الأناضول) is a swimming centre in Aleppo, Syria, featuring an indoor Olympic-size swimming pool with a seating capacity of 1,100 spectators. The complex was opened in 1998, and re-constructed in 2010 at a cost of US$ 10 million.

== Facilities ==
- Indoor Olympic swimming pool.
- Indoor tennis court.
- Ice-skating hall.
- Bowling saloon.
- 2 squash halls.
- Fitness centre.

== August 2013 bombing ==
On 22 August 2013, a suicide bomber belonging to the Syrian armed opposition has targeted a students' gathering in one of the restaurants of the complex. As a result of the bombing, 10 people were killed, including teenage girls and male journalists. More than 20 were seriously wounded.
