= She-camel of God =

Miraculous female camel in the Quran

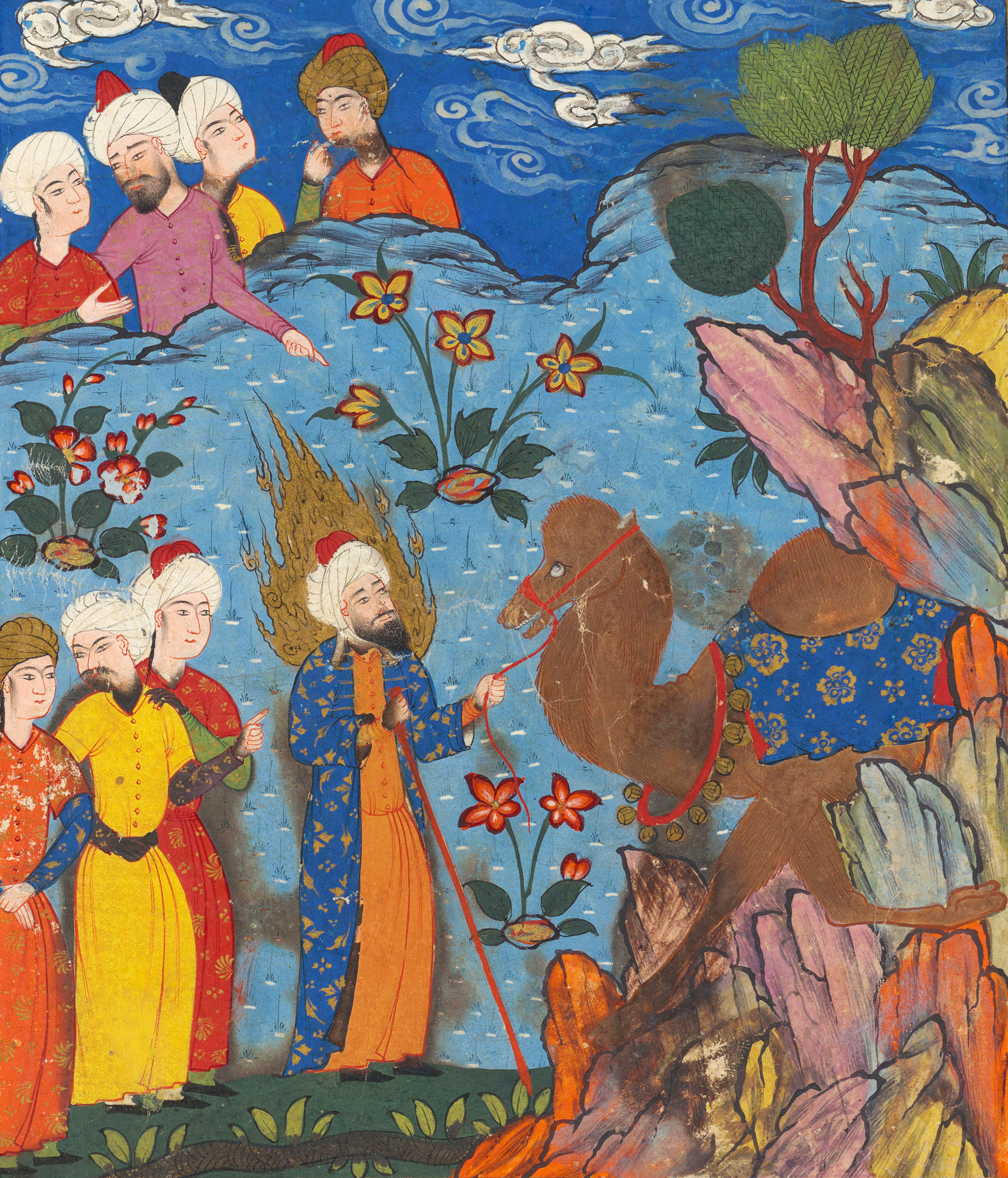
Salih inviting his people to see the She-Camel. Illuminated collection of Qisas al-Anbiya

The She-Camel of God (Arabic: نَاقة الله, romanized: naaqat Allah, lit. 'camel of God (f.)') in Islam was a miraculous female camel sent by God to the people of Thamud in Al-Hijr, after they demanded a miracle from Salih to prove his prophethood. The narrative and story of the she-camel is recorded in the Qur'an, particularly in Surah Al Hijr.

== Qur'anic mention ==
Amongst the many narrations in the Qur'an, one historical story deals with the people of Thamud, who lived after the people of ʿĀd in pre-Islamic Arabia. As the people of the community were heavily indulgent in idolatry, besides other issues, God sent the prophet and oracle Saleh to warn them of the impending doom that they would face if they did not mend their fraudulent ways.

== See also ==
- Animals in Islam
- Arabian Peninsula
- Hejaz
- List of characters and names mentioned in the Qur'an#Animals
