= Asad (2012 film) =

ASAD
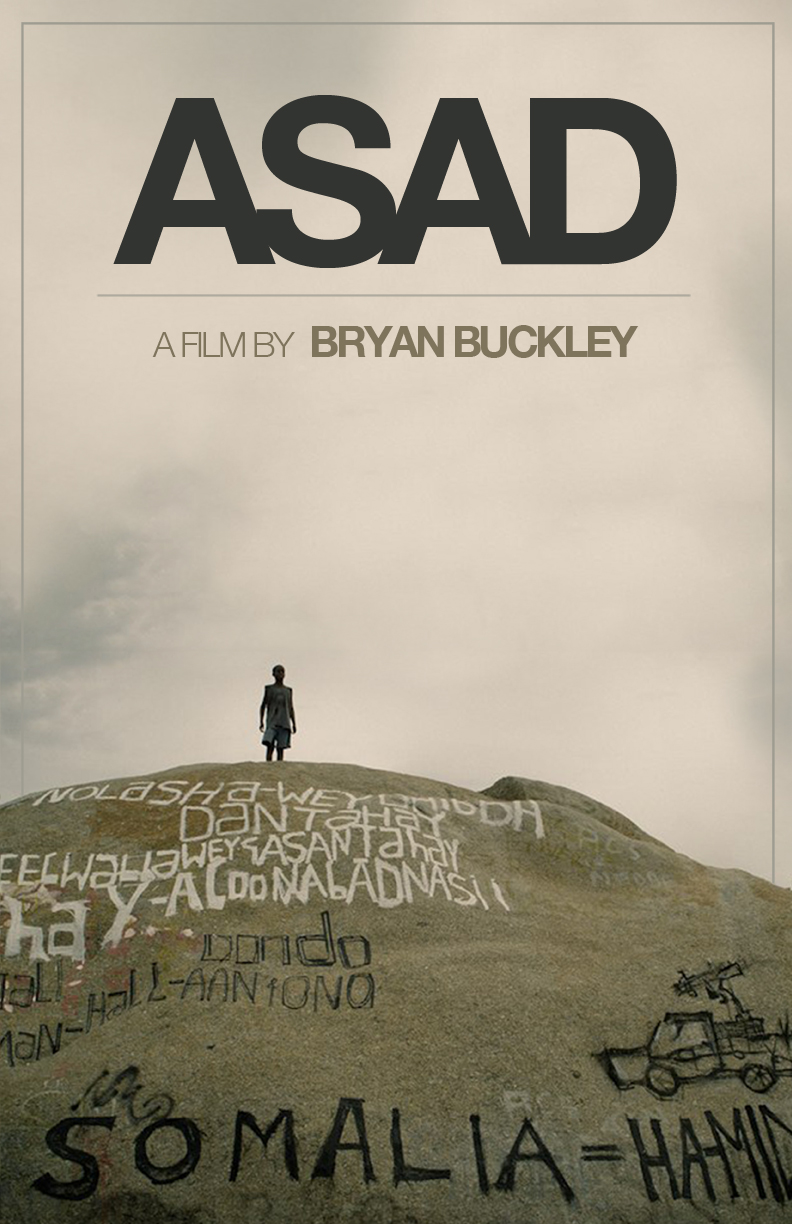
- Film poster
- Directed by: Bryan Buckley
- Written by: Bryan Buckley
- Produced by: Mino Jarjoura; Associate: Matt Lefebvre; Executive: Kevin Byrne; Hank Perlman; Producers: Bryan Buckley; Rafiq Samsodien
- Starring: Harun Mohammed; Ibrahim Moallim Hussein; Ali Mohammed; Abdiwale Mohmed Mohamed; Mariya Abdulle; Najah Abdi Abdullahi
- Cinematography: Scott Henriksen
- Edited by: Chris Franklin
- Music by: Marcel Khalife
- Distributed by: ShortsHD
- Release date: 2012
- Countries: United States; South Africa

Asad is a 2012 South African-American short film directed by Bryan Buckley. The film was nominated for the 2012 Academy Award for Best Live Action Short Film.

Produced in South Africa by Mino Jarjoura of Hungry Man Productions, the cast is made up of Somali refugees living in South Africa, none of whom had any acting experience prior to production.

After being nominated for an Oscar, the film was released along with all the other 15 Oscar-nominated short films in theaters by ShortsHD.

== Plot ==
Asad is a fisher boy in Somalia. His friends, led by Laban, are pirates. Asad feels as if he is suited for the pirate life. An old fisherman named Erasto would rather stick to an honest fishing life as opposed to piracy. Asad has never been able to catch anything on his fishing trips and is beginning to give up hope. Erasto tries to lift his spirits with his largest catch of the day.

When Asad is taking home the fish with his friend, various people on the street ask if he has caught it and he angrily tells them that he has not. His friend suggests that he should lie, but Asad says if he does he will be cursed forever and will not catch anything. As they are talking, they run into a group of Somali rebels that ask where all the beautiful women in their town are. When Asad's friend says he does not know, they threaten to kill him. Asad offers them the fish to save his friend's life.

The next day, Asad goes out to the sea to meet with Erasto for a fishing trip and notices the old man injured by the boat. Since Asad mentioned where the fish was caught, the Somali rebels had come for him. Erasto's arm was so badly injured that he could not fish. He tells Asad that the boy's luck will change today and he will finally catch something.

Asad feels the tug of a fish when out at sea and tries to reel it in, but it instead pulls his boat further into the sea, where he spies a luxury boat similar to the one that Laban and his friends were going to hold for ransom. Asad goes to see what happened and finds Laban, his friends, and the woman who had the boat all dead. He begins to inspect another room and finds a Persian cat that he brings back to Erasto. Neither of them know what a cat is, but they say it resembles a white lion. Erasto marks that Asad's name means "lion". Asad names the cat Lionfish and takes it back to his village to look after it; his luck changed.

== Awards ==
Awards for ASAD
Year	Association	Award Category	Status
2013	Academy Awards	Best Short Film - Live Action	Nominated
2012	Tribeca Film Festival	Best Narrative Short	Won
2012	Los Angeles Film Festival	Audience Award	Won
2012	Austin Film Festival	Audience Award	Won
2012	Austin Film Festival	Best Narrative Short	Won
2012	New Orleans Film Festival	Best Narrative Short Film	Won
2012	Rhode Island International Film Festival	Grand Prize – Best Short Film	Won
2012	Traverse City Film Festival	Special Jury Prize	Won
2012	HollyShorts Film Festival	Best Short Film	Won
2012	One Lens Film Festival	1st Place and Social Justice Award	Won
2012	Mill Valley Film Festival	BAFTA/LA Award - Best Short Film	Won
2012	San Jose International Film Festival	Best of Fest	Won
2012	Denver Film Festival	Starz People's Choice Award for Short Film	Won
2012	Boulder International Film Festival	Best Short Film	Won
