= Thamud =

Tribal confederation in pre-Islamic Arabia

Thamud ثَمُوْد
- Ancient Arab tribe
- Ethnicity: Arab
- Nisba: al-Thamūdi
- Location: Hegra, northern Hejaz
- Language: Thamudic, Old Arabic
- Religion: Arabian polytheism

The Thamud (Arabic: ثَمُود, romanized: Ṯamūd) were an ancient tribe or tribal confederation in pre-Islamic Arabia that occupied the northwestern Arabian Peninsula. They are attested in contemporaneous Mesopotamian and Classical inscriptions, as well as Arabic ones from the eighth century BCE, all the way until the fifth century CE, when they served as Roman auxiliaries. They are also later remembered in pre-Islamic Arabic poetry and Islamic-era sources, including the Quran. Prominently, they appear in the Ruwafa inscriptions discovered in a temple constructed circa 165–169 CE in honor of the local deity, ʾlhʾ.

Islamic sources state that the Thamud were an early Arab tribe that had gone extinct in ancient days. Thamud appears twenty-six times in the Quran, where the tribe is presented as an example of an ancient polytheistic people destroyed by God for their rejection of God's prophet Salih. In the Quran, Thamud is associated with a pattern of rebellion and destruction of past groups of people. This is done the most times with Ad, but others as well, like Lot and Noah. When Salih calls Thamud to serve one God, they demand a sign from him. He presents them with a miraculous she-camel. Thamud, unconvinced, injure the camel; for this, God destroys them, except Salih and his followers. This account is embellished with a more detailed background in the Islamic exegetical tradition. Some traditions locate the tribe in northwestern Arabia at Hegra, and in others they are identified as Nabataeans. Islamic genealogy describes the Thamud as among the true Arab tribes, as opposed to the "Arabicized Arabs".

It is possible that several, possibly unrelated groups, took on the name of Thamud; they probably spoke Old Arabic. The Thamud are not specially connected to the Thamudic scripts, an aggregate term for understudied writing systems of Ancient Arabia.

== Pre-Islamic sources ==
=== Ancient Near East ===
The word Thamud appears in the Annals of the Assyrian king Sargon II (r. 722—705 BCE), inscribed at Dur-Sharrukin. As the "Ta-mu-di", the peoples are mentioned together with the Ephah, the "Ibadidi", and the "Marsimani" as part of "the distant desert-dwelling Arabs who knew neither overseers nor officials and had not brought their tribute to any king". Sargon defeated these tribes, according to his Annals, and had them forcibly deported to Samaria. Historian Israel Eph'al questions the plausibility of Sargon's account, as the briefness of Sargon's account seems to be at odds with the fact that such a campaign deep into Arabia would have been one of the longest wars in Assyrian history, and because no mention of plunder is provided. Eph'al instead speculates that the Thamūd and other Arab tribes may have made arrangements with Sargon to trade in Samaria, which Assyrian historians embellished as submission.

A surviving letter from Nabonidus, a sixth-century BC king of Babylon, includes an order that a "Te-mu-da-a Ar-ba-a-a", apparently "Thamudi Arab", be given several talents of silver. This individual was probably a merchant or official in service of the Babylonian court.

=== Greek and Roman ===
Thamud is also mentioned in several accounts of Greek historiography. Portions of Agatharchides's (fl. 2nd century BCE) On the Erythrean Sea that survive in later quotations mention that the Thamud Arabs then inhabited a "stony and large shore" of the Arabian coastline, south of the Gulf of Aqaba. In Bibliotheca historica, Diodorus, a 1st-century BCE Greek historian, mentions Thamūd in his description of the "Arabian Gulf" (the Red Sea): "This coast, then, is inhabited by Arabs who are called Thamudeni; but the coast next to it is bounded by a very large gulf, off which lie scattered islands which are in appearance very much like the islands called the Echinades". The coast being referred to lies just prior to Yemen.

In a somewhat muddled passage, Pliny the Elder, a Roman historian of the first century CE, appears to locate the Thamūd at the unidentified inland town of "Baclanaza". Ptolemy, who lived in the second century, wrote that the "Thamuditai" tribe inhabited the Red Sea coastline, and that the "Thamoudenoi" tribe lived in inland northwestern Arabia—either or both may be references to the Thamūd—while his contemporary Uranius believed that the Thamūd neighbored the Nabateans. The Thamūd also joined the Byzantine armies as auxiliaries, and the Notitia Dignitatum mentions two units of Thamūd warriors serving the Byzantine Empire, one in Egypt and the other in Palestine.

=== Pre-Islamic Arabian inscriptions ===
The Thamūd are infrequently mentioned in contemporary indigenous Arabian sources, although two Safaitic inscriptions carved some time between the first century BCE and the fourth century CE refer to "the year of the war between Gšm and the tribe of Thamūd [snt ḥrb gšm ʾl ṯmd]". An important exception is a temple at al-Ruwāfa in northwestern Saudi Arabia, built by the Thamūd themselves in the 160s CE. The temple inscriptions, known as the Ruwafa inscriptions (composed bilingually in Ancient Greek and Nabataean Aramaic) state that it was constructed by a priest named Šʿdt of the "Thamūd of Robathū" for ʾlhʾ, apparently the patron deity of the tribe, with the Roman government's support. Robathū is likely the ancient name of modern al-Ruwāfa. The Thamūd in question were Roman auxiliary troops, as the inscription states explicitly:

For the well-being of the rulers of the whole world... Marcus Aurelius Antoninus and Lucius Aurelius Verus, who are the conquerors of the Armenians. This is the temple that was built by the tribal unit of Thamūd, the leaders of their unit, so that it might be established by their hands and be their place of veneration forever... with the support of Antistius Adventus, the governor.

=== Pre-Islamic Arabic poetry ===
Thamud is mentioned in pre-Islamic Arabic poetry. Though they may have survived as late as the fourth century CE, they are already referred to by the poets as a long-lost tribe. For the poets, the name of Thamud was an attestation of the transience of all things. One poem attributed to Imru' al-Qais observes and compares a site of massacre to the peoples of Thamud.

Another poem, attributed to Umayya ibn Abi as-Salt, a contemporary of Muhammad, describes the story of the camel and Thamud. In Umayya's account, there is no Salih. Instead, the camel is killed by a certain "accursed Aḥmar", and the camel's foal stands upon a rock and curses Thamud, leading to the tribe's annihilation except for a single lame woman who is spared to spread the message of the destruction. The authenticity of the poem is disputed.

== Islamic sources ==
Thamud is mentioned twenty-three times in the Quran as part of a moralistic lesson about God's destruction of sinful communities, a central motif in the Quran. According to the Quran, the Thamud were the successors of a previous community called the ʿĀd, who had also been destroyed for their sins. They lived in houses carved into the surface of the earth. God chose the prophet Salih to warn the polytheistic Thamud that they should worship the One God. The tribe refused to heed him, saying that Salih was merely a mortal, and demanded a sign from God. God sent down a milch camel as his sign, and Salih told his countrymen that they should not harm the camel and allow it to drink from their well. But the Thamud cut its hamstring or otherwise wounded it. God then destroyed the tribe, except for Salih and a few other righteous men. The means of God's destruction of Thamud include a thunderbolt, a storm, a shout, and an earthquake. The shout, which is an extremely loud sound, might have caused the earthquake, according to certain scholars. The account presented in Surah an-Naml also mentions nine evil people of Thamud who are immediately responsible for God's punishment of their people^{[Quran 27:48–51]} in a narrative reminiscent of Jewish descriptions of the demise of Sodom.

To the Thamūd, We sent their brother, Ṣāliḥ. He said, "My people, worship God. You have no god other than Him. It was He who brought you into being from the earth and made you inhabit it, so ask forgiveness from Him, and turn back to Him: my Lord is near, and ready to answer." They said, "Ṣāliḥ, We used to have such great hope in you. Will you forbid us to worship what our fathers worshiped? We are in grave doubt about what you are asking us to do." He said, "My people, just think: if I did have clear proof from my Lord, and if He had given me mercy of His own, who could protect me from God if I disobeyed Him? You would only make my loss greater. My people, this camel belongs to God, a sign for you, so leave it to pasture on God's earth and do not harm it, or you will soon be punished." But they hamstrung it, so he said, "Enjoy life for another three days: this warning will not prove false." And so, when Our command was fulfilled, by Our mercy We saved Ṣāliḥ and his fellow believers from the disgrace of that day. [Prophet], it is your Lord who is the Strong, the Mighty One. The blast struck the evildoers and they lay dead in their homes, as though they had never lived and flourished there. Yes, the Thamūd denied their Lord—so away with the Thamūd!^{[Quran 11:61–68 (Abdel Haleem)]}

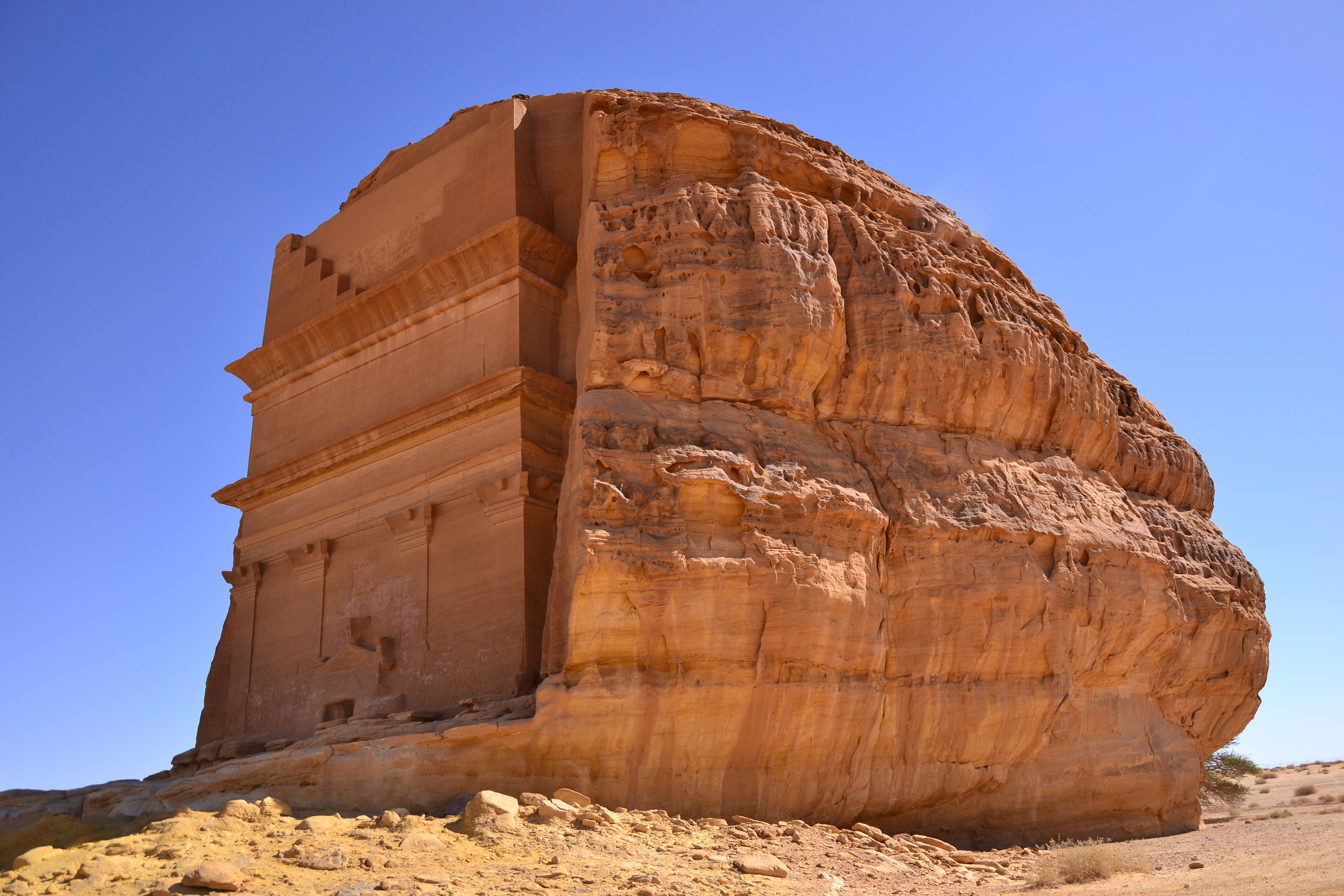
Ruins of carved buildings at Hegra

The Islamic exegetical tradition adds detail to the Quran's account. Accordingly, the Thamud were a powerful and idolatrous tribe living in Hegra, now called Madāʼin Ṣāliḥ, the Cities of Ṣāliḥ—in northwestern Arabia. When Salih began to preach monotheism, the Thamud demanded that he prove his prophethood by bringing forth a pregnant camel from solid rock. When God permitted the prophet to do this, some of the tribesmen followed Salih, while many powerful leaders continued to oppose him. After giving birth, the camel drank all the water from a well every two days and then produced enormous amounts of milk for the people. But it was hamstrung and eventually killed by nine people of Thamud, who then attempted but failed to kill Salih himself. Having failed to save his people, Salih warned that they would be destroyed after three days. On the first day, their skin would turn yellow; on the second day, red; and on the final day of destruction, black. This came to pass, and Thamud was annihilated. The traditional Muslim view is that the destruction of Thamud occurred before the prophethood of Abraham.

A hadith tradition preserved in the Ṣaḥīḥ al-Bukhārī collection narrates that the Islamic prophet Muhammad called Hegra "the land of Thamud" and did not allow his troops to drink from its wells or to use its water, and to never enter its ruins "unless weeping, lest occur to you what happened to them." The stone constructions of Hegra are actually mostly from the Nabataean period, especially the first century CE. The ninth-century Muslim scholar Ibn Saʿd believed that the Thamud were the Nabateans.

Some Islamic sources claim that the Banu Thaqif tribe, an Arab tribe from Ta'if in the period of Muhammad, was descended from a survivor of the Thamud (sometimes a slave of Salih).

== Thamudic script ==
Thamudic is an aggregate name for some 15,000 inscriptions from pre-Islamic Arabia, which have not yet been properly studied and categorized into their distinct languages. The name arose in the nineteenth century, when many people asserted that the Thamud tribe was responsible for the creation of these inscriptions. However, since then, it has become widely accepted among epigraphists that there is no evidence justifying a connection between these inscriptions and the tribe of Thamud.

== See also ==
- Atlantis of the Sands

== Sources ==
- Eph'al, Israel (1982), The Ancient Arabs: Nomads on the Borders of the Fertile Crescent, 9th—5th Centuries B.C., Brill, ISBN 9789652234001
- Firestone, Reuven (2006), "Thamūd", in McAuliffe, Jane Dammen (ed.), Encyclopaedia of the Qurʼān, Volume Five, Brill, pp. 252–254, ISBN 978-9004123564
- Graf, David F.; Zwettler, Michael J. (2004), "The North Arabian 'Thamudic E' Inscription from Uraynibah West", Bulletin of the American Schools of Oriental Research, 335 (335): 53–89, doi:10.2307/4150069, JSTOR 4150069, S2CID 162185795
- Hoyland, Robert G. (2001), Arabia and the Arabs: From the Bronze Age to the Coming of Islam, Routledge, ISBN 0-415-19535-7
- Macdonald, Michael C. A. (2015), "Arabs and Empires before the Sixth Century", in Fisher, Greg (ed.), Arabs and Empires before Islam, Oxford University Press, pp. 11–90, ISBN 978-0-19-965452-9
- Mackintosh-Smith, Tim (2019). Arabs: A 3,000-Year History of Peoples, Tribes and Empires. Yale University Press.
- Munt, Harry (2015), "Arabic and Persian Sources for Pre-Islamic Arabia", in Fisher, Greg (ed.), Arabs and Empires before Islam, Oxford University Press, pp. 434–500, ISBN 978-0-19-965452-9
- Retsö, Jan (2003), The Arabs in Antiquity: Their history from the Assyrians to the Umayyads, Routledge, ISBN 0-7007-1679-3
- Robin, Christian Julien (2010). "Langues et écritures". In Al-Ghabban, A. (ed.). Routes d'Arabie. Editions du musée du Louvre. pp. 118–131.
- Sinai, Nicolai (2011), "Religious poetry from the Quranic milieu: Umayya b. Abī l-Ṣalt on the fate of the Thamūd", Bulletin of the School of Oriental and African Studies, 74 (3): 397–416, doi:10.1017/S0041977X11000309, JSTOR 41287978
