= Salih =

Arab prophet in Islam

Prophet Ṣāliḥ Alayhi as-Salam
- صَالِحٌ Selah
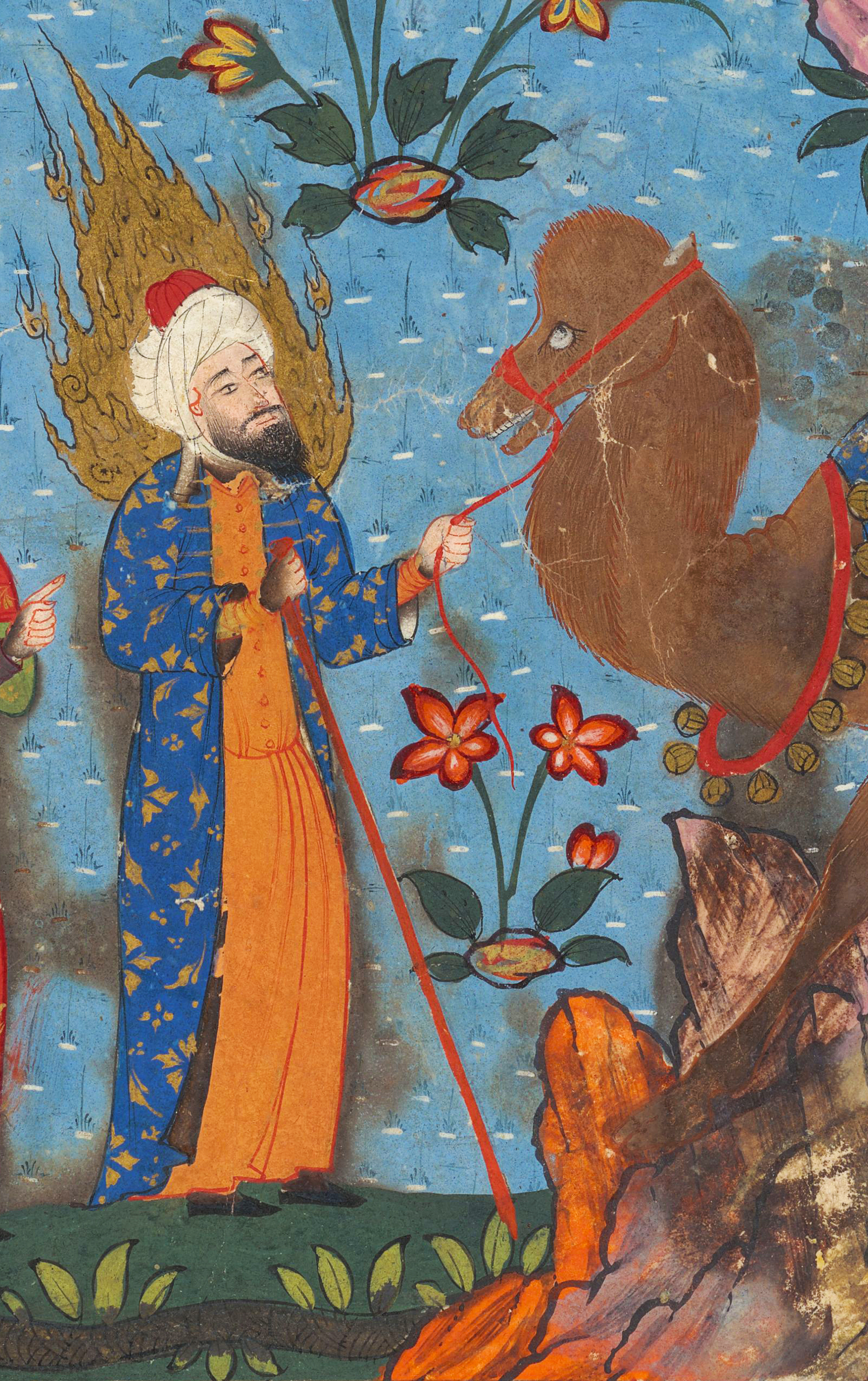
- Salih leads the she-camel of God from the side of a mountain.

Prophet of Islam
- Preceded by: Hud
- Succeeded by: Abraham

Personal life
- Resting place: Hasik (present day Oman)
- Relatives: Thamud

Religious life
- Religion: Islam

Salih or Saleh (Arabic: صَالِحٌ, romanized: Ṣāliḥ) is a prophet mentioned in the Qur'an who prophesied to the tribe of Thamud in ancient Arabia, before the lifetime of Muhammad. The story of Salih is linked to that of the she-camel of God, a gift from God to the people of Thamud when they sought a miracle to confirm that Salih was a prophet.

== Historical context ==
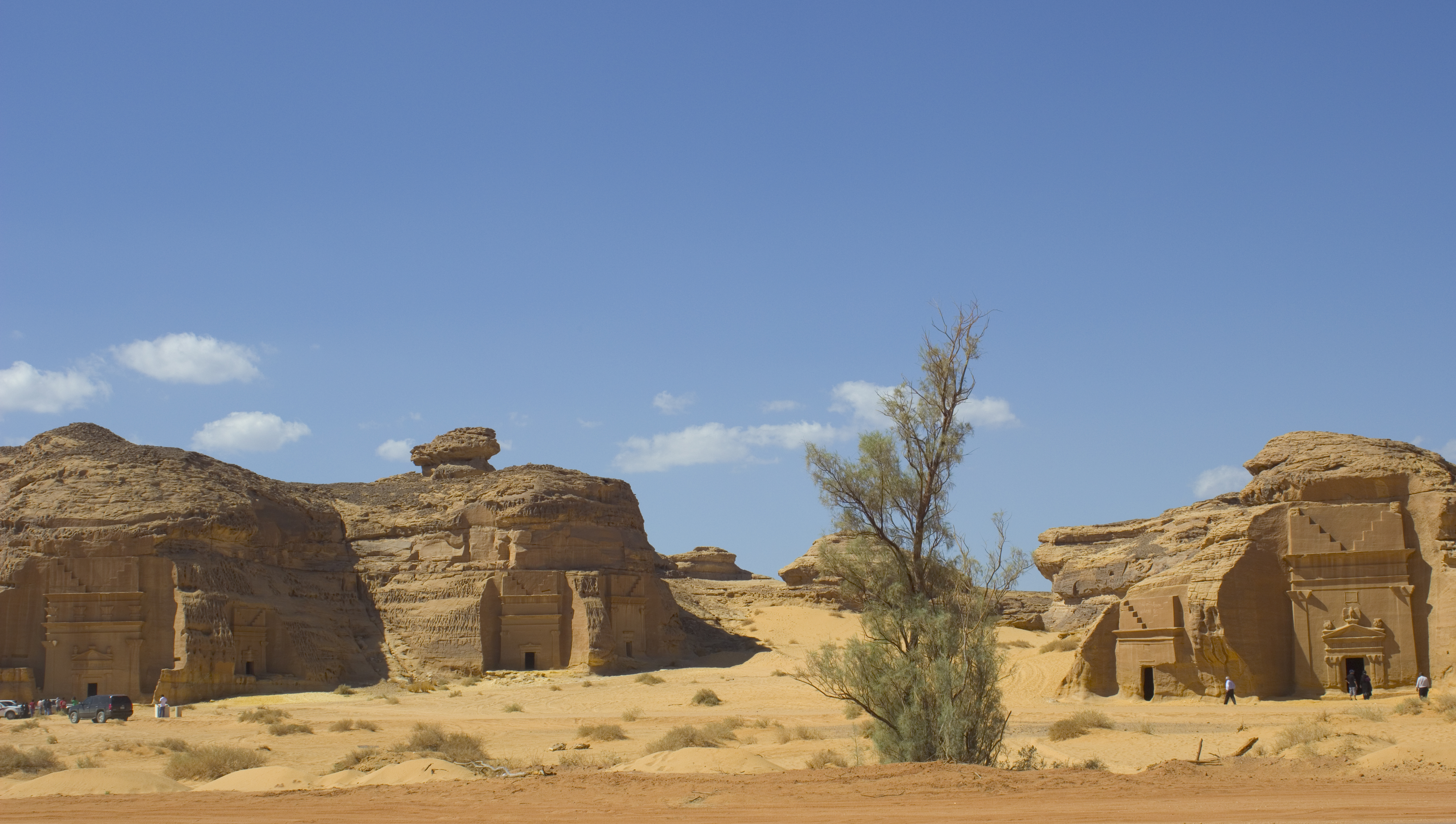
Mada'in Salih or Al-Hijr in the Hejaz Mountains of Saudi Arabia

The Thamud were a tribal confederation in the northwestern region of the Arabian Peninsula mentioned in Akkadian literature during the reign of Sargon II of the Neo-Assyrian Empire. The tribe's name continues to appear in documents into the fourth century, but by the sixth century, they were regarded as a group that had vanished long ago.

According to the Quran, the city that Salih was sent to was called al-Ḥijr (Arabic: ٱلْحِجْرْ, lit. 'The Stonetown'), which corresponds to the Nabataean city of Hegra. The city rose to prominence around the 1st century as an important site in the regional caravan trade. Adjacent to the city were large, decorated rock-cut tombs used by members of various religious groups. At an unknown point in ancient times, the site was abandoned and possibly functionally replaced by Al-'Ula. The site has been referred to as Mada'in Salih (Arabic: ﻣﺪﺍﺋﻦ ﺻﺎﻟﺢ, romanized: madāʼin Ṣāliḥ, lit. 'the cities of Salih') since the era of Muhammad and was named after his predecessor, Salih.

Salih is not mentioned in any historical texts or in any of the Abrahamic scriptures that precede the Qur'an, but the account of Thamud's destruction may have been well known in ancient Arabia. The tribe's name is used in ancient Arabian poetry as a metaphor for "the transience of all things".

== In Islam ==
=== Qur'an ===
According to Muslim tradition, the people of Thamud relied on Salih for support. He was chosen by God as a prophet and sent to preach against the selfishness of the wealthy and to condemn the practice of shirk (polytheism). Although Salih preached for a sustained period, the people of Thamud refused to heed his warning and instead asked him to perform a miracle for them. They said: “O Ṣāliḥ! We truly had high hopes in you before this. How dare you forbid us to worship what our forefathers had worshipped? We are certainly in alarming doubt about what you are inviting us to.”

Salih reminded his people of the castles and palaces they built out of stone.He also told them about their ancestors, the ʿĀd, and how they too were destroyed for their sins. Some of the people of Thamud believed Salih's words, but the tribal leaders refused to listen to him and continued to demand that he demonstrate a miracle to prove his prophethood.

In response, God gave the Thamud a blessed she-camel (Arabic: نَاقة, romanized: nāqah) as both a means of sustenance and a test. The tribe was told to allow the camel to graze peacefully and avoid harming her. In defiance of Salih's warning, the people of the tribe hamstrung the camel. Salih informed them that they had only three more days to live before the wrath of God descended upon them. The people of the city were remorseful, but their crime could not be undone, and all the disbelieving people in the city were killed in an earthquake. Al-Hijr was rendered uninhabitable and remained in ruins thereafter. Salih himself and the few believers who followed him survived.

The story is expanded upon in the surah an-Naml. Whilst the she-camel is not mentioned explicitly in this chapter, it states that nine men plotted to kill Salih and his whole family, a crime for which they were struck down by God three days later.

=== Muslim tradition ===
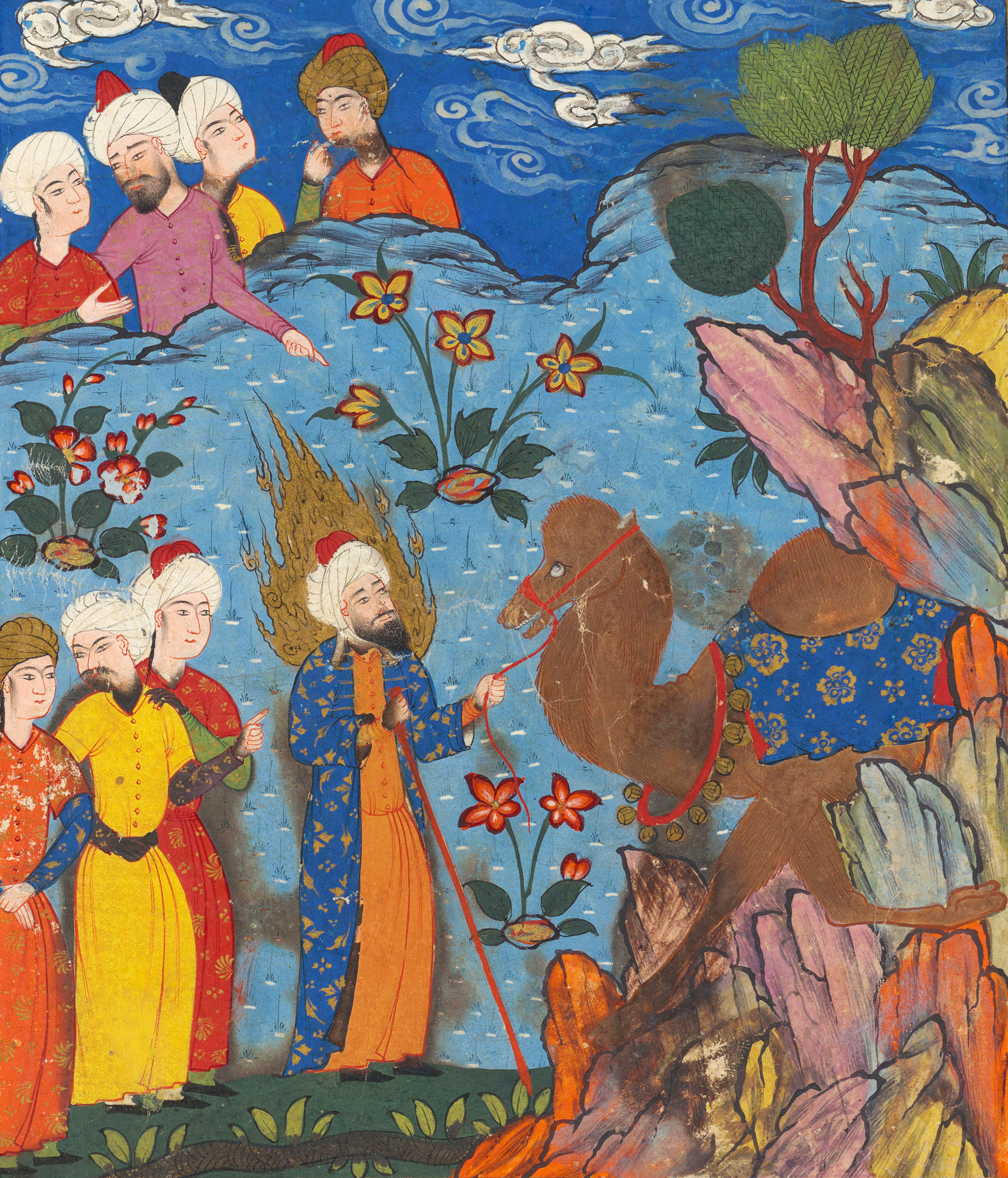
Salih inviting his people to see the She-Camel from a Persian 1577 manuscript

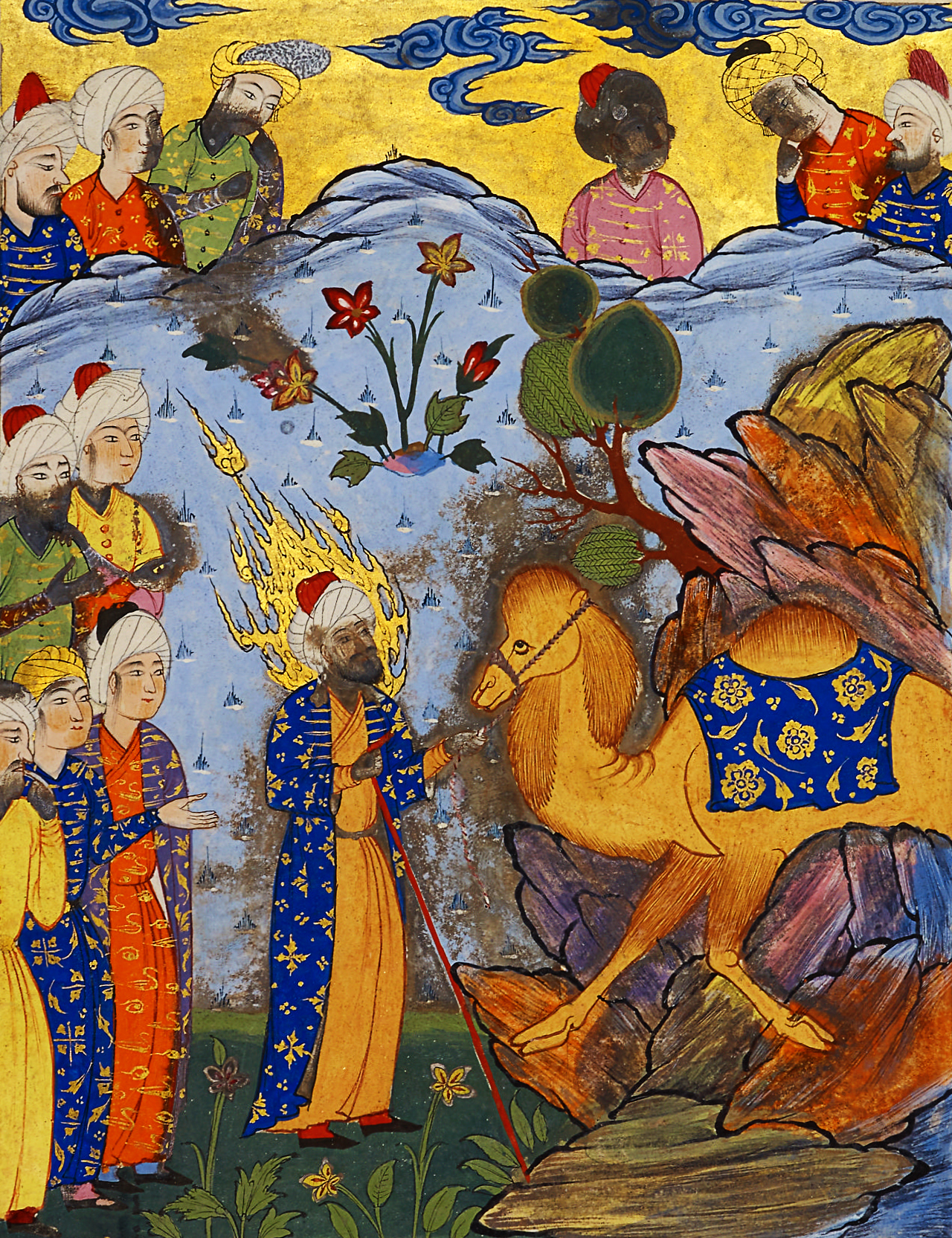
Same scene from a different 1577 manuscript

Muslim writers have elaborated upon the story of Salih and the she-camel. Early Islamic tradition often involved a motif of the camel miraculously emerging from stone, often accompanied by a calf, and the production of milk from the camel. Al-Tabari states that Salih summoned his people to a mountain, where they witnessed the rock miraculously split open, revealing the camel. The she-camel had a young calf. Salih informed the Thamud that the older camel was to drink from their water source on one day, and they were to drink from it the next day. On days when they were not allowed to drink water, the camel provided them with milk. But God informed Salih that a boy who would hamstring the camel would soon be born to the tribe, and that child was evil and grew unnaturally fast. The camel was indeed killed, by a man of honour and power amongst Thamudand its calf cried out three times, signaling that the Thamud would be destroyed in three days. Their faces turned yellow, then red, then black, and they died on the third day as predicted.

According to some Islamic scholars, the mother of Ismail, Hajar, was a granddaughter of Salih.

A similar tradition is related in an eighth-century commentary on Islam by John of Damascus and is also mentioned in the works of Ibn Kathir.

== In the Baháʼí Faith ==
The founder of the Baháʼí Faith, Bahá'u'lláh, briefly mentioned the story of the hamstrung she-camel in the Lawh-i-Burhán, and commented also upon Salih's ministry in the Kitáb-i-Íqán. 'Abdu'l-Bahá states that the she-camel symbolizes the holy spirit of Salih and the camel's milk refers to the spiritual food that he offered to his people.

In the Kitáb-i-Íqán, Salih is referred to as "the holy person of Sálih, Who again summoned the people to the river of everlasting life." Like other Prophets of God, the people of the time turned away from Him: "His admonitions, however, yielded no fruit, and His pleading proved of no avail....All this, although that eternal Beauty was summoning the people to no other than the city of God."

== See also ==
- Selah (biblical figure)
- Methuselah
- Biblical and Quranic narratives
- List of notable Hijazis
- Prophets and messengers in Islam
- Qiṣaṣ al-Anbiyāʾ ("Stories of the Prophets")
- Kitáb-i-Íqán (Book of Certitude)
