= Hud (prophet) =

Arab prophet in Islam

Prophet Hūd Alayhi as-Salam
- هود; Eber
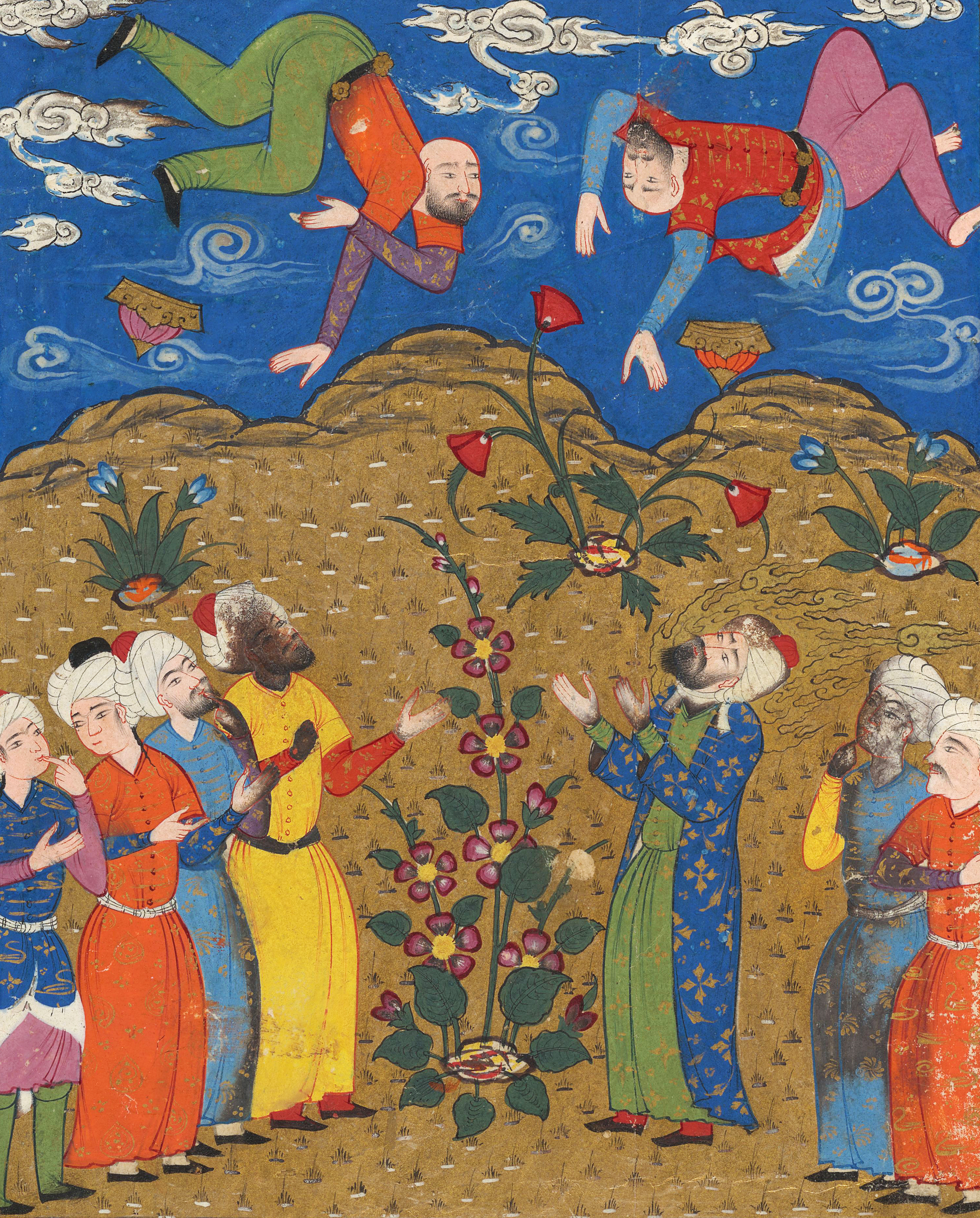
- Hud (third man from the right) causes two kings of Ad to be tossed up in the air.

Prophet of Islam
- Preceded by: Nuh
- Succeeded by: Saleh

Personal life
- Resting place: Possibly Qabr An-Nabi Hud in Hadhramaut Governorate, Yemen

Religious life
- Religion: Islam

Hūd (Arabic: هود) is believed in Islam to have been a messenger sent to ancient Arabia before Muhammad. Hud is repeatedly mentioned in the Quran (Note: Multiple references:) whose eleventh chapter is also named after him (although only a small portion of it is actually about him).

== Historical context ==
Hud has sometimes been identified with Eber, an ancestor of the Ishmaelites and the Israelites who is mentioned in the Old Testament.

Hud is said to have been a subject of a mulk (Arabic: مُلْك, lit. 'kingdom') named after its founder, 'Ad, a fourth-generation descendant of Noah (his father being Uz, the son of Aram, who was the son of Shem, who in turn was a son of Noah):

The ʿĀd people, with their prophet Hud, are mentioned in many places. See especially 26:123–140 ^{-Yusuf Ali}, and 46:21–26 ^{-Yusuf Ali}. Their eponymous ancestor ʿAd was fourth in generation from Noah, having been a son of 'Aus, the son of Aram, the son of Sam, the son of Noah. They occupied a large tract of country in Southern Arabia, extending from Umman at the mouth of the Persian Gulf to Hadhramaut and Yemen, Oman at the southern end of the Red Sea. The people were tall in stature and were great builders. Probably the long, winding tracts of sands (ahqaf) in their dominions (46:21) were irrigated with canals. They forsook the true God, and oppressed their people. A three years famine visited them, but yet they took no warning. At length a terrible blast of wind destroyed them and their land, but a remnant, known as the second ʿĀd or the Thamud (see below) were saved, and afterwards suffered a similar fate for their sins. The tomb of the Prophet Hud (qabr Nabi Hud) is still traditionally shown in Hadhramaut, latitude 16 N, and longitude 49 1/2 E, about 90 miles north of Mukalla. There are ruins and inscriptions in the neighborhood.

— Abdullah Yusuf Ali, The Holy Qur'an: Text, Translation and Commentary, Note 1040

The other tribes said to be present at this time in Arabia, were the Thamud, Jurhum, Tasam, Jadis, Amim, Midian, Amalek Imlaq, Jasim, Qahtan, Banu Yaqtan and others.

The Quran gives the location of ʿĀd as being Al-Aḥqāf (Arabic: ٱلْأَحْقَاف, lit. 'The Sandy Plains / The Wind-curved Sand-hills'). It is believed to have been in South Arabia, possibly in eastern Yemen and/or western Oman. In November 1991, a settlement was discovered and hypothesized to be Ubar, which is thought to be mentioned in the Qur'an as Iram dhāt al-ʿImād ("Iram of the Pillars" or "Iram of the Columns"), and may have been the capital of ʿĀd. One of the members of the original expedition, archeologist Juris Zarins, however, later concluded that the discovery did not represent a city called Ubar. In a 1996 interview on the subject, he said:

If you look at the classical texts and the Arab historical sources, Ubar refers to a region and a group of people, not to a specific town. People always overlook that. It's very clear on Ptolemy's second century map of the area. It says in big letters "Iobaritae". And in his text that accompanied the maps, he's very clear about that. It was only the late medieval version of One Thousand and One Nights, in the fourteenth or fifteenth century, that romanticised Ubar and turned it into a city, rather than a region or a people.

The Moroccan mystic Abdulaziz ad-Dabbagh gives detailed information about Hud: According to him, 53:50 alludes to the fact that Hud was sent to the second ʿAd tribe, which lived after Noah. The first 'Ad tribe had a messenger named Huwayd, whose message was to be revived by Hud, and the tribe was destroyed with stones and fire by God. Hud was Eber's son (see Eber in Islam for his genealogy) and Iram was the name of one of the tribes of 'Ad, specifically the one Hud was sent to (see Iram in the Qur'an).

== Narrative in the Quran ==
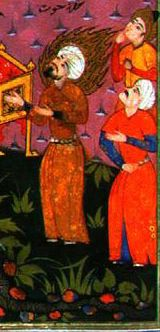
The prophet Hud, in a Persian illustrated Stories of the Prophets

This is a brief summary of Hud's narrative, with emphasis on two particular verses:

The people of ʿĀd were extremely powerful and wealthy and they built countless buildings and monuments to show their power. However, the ʿĀd people's wealth ultimately proved to be their source of pride, as they became arrogant and forsook God and began to adopt idols for worship, including three named Samd, Samud and Hara. Hud, even in childhood, remained consistent in prayer to God. It is related through exegesis that Hud's mother, a pious woman who had seen great visions at her son's birth, was the only person who encouraged Hud in his worship. Thus, the Lord raised up Hud as a prophet for the ʿĀd people. According to a tafsir of the whole Surah Hud by scholars, the 'Ad were a powerful empire that preceded the era of Abraham and Nimrod, and they were tyrannically oppressive towards other civilizations at that time.

When Hud started preaching and invited them to the worship of only the true God and when he told them to repent for their past sins and ask for mercy and forgiveness, the ʿĀd people began to revile him and wickedly began to mock God's message. Hud's story epitomizes the prophetic cycle common to the early prophets mentioned in the Quran: the prophet is sent to his people to tell them to worship God only and tells them to acknowledge that it is God who is the provider of their blessings The Quran states:

11:50 And to the people of ’Âd We sent their brother Hûd. He said, "O my people! Worship Allah. You have no god other than Him. You do nothing but fabricate lies ˹against Allah˺.
11:51 O my people! I do not ask you for any reward for this ˹message˺. My reward is only from the One Who created me. Will you not then understand?
11:52 And O my people! Seek your Lord’s forgiveness and turn to Him in repentance. He will shower you with rain in abundance, and add strength to your strength. So do not turn away, persisting in wickedness."
11:53 They argued, "O Hûd! You have not given us any clear proof, and we will never abandon our gods upon your word, nor will we believe in you.
11:54 All we can say is that some of our gods have possessed you with evil." He said, "I call Allah to witness, and you too bear witness, that I ˹totally˺ reject whatever you associate
11:55 with Him ˹in worship˺. So let all of you plot against me without delay!
11:56 I have put my trust in Allah—my Lord and your Lord. There is no living creature that is not completely under His control. Surely my Lord’s Way is perfect justice.
11:57 But if you turn away, I have already delivered to you what I have been sent with. My Lord will replace you with others. You are not harming Him in the least. Indeed, my Lord is a ˹vigilant˺ Keeper over all things."

— Surah Hud 11:50-57

=== Miracle ===
According to a tafsir from Ibn Qayyim al-Jawziyya in his book of analysis, Madaarij Saalikeen, which has been quoted by Ibn Abi al-Izz in his syarh (commentary) of Al-Aqida al-Tahawiyya, Hud has a miracle, which is pointed by the verse of 54-57:

(54–55) "All we can say is that some of our gods have smitten you with evil." He replied: "I call God to witness, and you be witness too, that I am clear of what you associate (in your affairs) ... Apart from Him. Contrive against me as much as you like, and give me no respite."

(56) "I place my trust in God who is my Lord and your Lord. There is no creature that moves on the earth who is not held by the forelock firmly by Him. Verily the way of my Lord is straight."

(57) "If you turn away, then (remember) I have delivered to you the message I was sent with. My Lord will put other people in your place, and you will not be able to prevail against Him. Indeed my Lord keeps a watch over all things."

— Qur'an, Surah 11 (Hud), Ayat 54 –57

Both Ibn Qayyim and Ibn Abi al-Izz, examining this chain of verses as the occurrence when Hud fought alone against entire nation of 'Ad, the entire city was about to harm him both psychologically and physically, only to be defeated by miraculous power shown by Hud, which resulted from his firm belief to the protection from God. Umar Sulaiman Al-Ashqar, a Salafi scholar of Tafsir, quoted this literation in his book, while his brother, Muhammad Sulaiman Al Ashqar, professor of Islamic University of Madinah, also implied his support of this narrative about Hud's miracle, in his own tafsir, Zubdat at Tafsir Min Fath al Qadir. The miracle is further highlighted by Firanda Andirja, lecturer of Al-Masjid al-Haram.

=== Calamity upon ʿĀd ===
After Hud has been left alone by the people of ʿĀd for a long time. The majority of them, however, refused to pay any notice to his teachings and they kept ignoring and mocking all he said. As their aggression, arrogance and idolatry deepened, God, after plenty of warning, sent a thunderous storm to finish the wicked people of ʿĀd once and for all. The destruction of the ʿĀd is described in the Quran:

Then when they saw the torment as a ˹dense˺ cloud approaching their valleys, they said ˹happily˺, "This is a cloud bringing us rain." ˹But Hûd replied,˺ "No, it is what you sought to hasten: a ˹fierce˺ wind carrying a painful punishment!" It destroyed everything by the command of its Lord, leaving nothing visible except their ruins. This is how We reward the wicked people.

— Surah Al-Ahqaf 46:24-25

The King Saud University from The Kingdom of Saudi Arabia stated the interpretation from Al-Tabari of Quran 69:6-129 were narrated about the disaster which caused the extinction of ʿĀd. Wahbah al-Zuhayli, Salih bin Abdullah al Humaid, Imam of the Masjid al-Haram, along with the officials of the Ministry of Islamic Affairs, Dawah, and Guidance also agreed the verse were speaking about the punishment from God towards ʿĀd peoples.

Meanwhile, another Quran verse that describes further the characteristics of winds that bear calamity was in surat adh-Dhariyat: "And in ˹the story of˺ ’Âd ˹was another lesson,˺ when We sent against them the devastating wind."Surah Adh-Dhariyat 51:41

Exegesis experts translate Ar-Rīḥ al-ʿAqīm (ٱلرِّيْح ٱلْعَقِيْم) literally as "fruitless wind" or "barren wind", a wind that does not bring benefit or any positive reaction to any biological existences. According to Arabic linguists and tafseer experts who examined al-Aqeem, its literal form is "sterile" in this verse's context, which correlates with the antithesis of the common characteristic of natural winds, which usually benefit the natural cycle, or any biological progressions or reproductions, whether for humans, animals or plants.

In addition to its barren characteristic, another verse also described additional features about the catastrophic tornado which decimated the 'Ad is in Surah Al-Qamar: "Indeed, We sent against them a furious wind, on a day of unrelenting misery".Surah Al-Qamar 54:19

Exegesis experts describe ar-Rīḥ ash-Sharshar (ٱلرِّيْح ٱلشَّرْشَر, the cold and harsh wind) as literally freezing yet possess thunderous deafening voice, and according to Tafsir Ibn Kathir, the strength of such punishing winds alone has squeezed the peoples of Ad inside out, until their intestines came out from their rectum and mouths. Nevertheless, modern contemporary scholars such as Al-Tahawi, Wahbah al-Zuhayli, and other scholars from Islamic University of Madinah and Saudi religious ministry has interpreted the verses of Al-Qamar from 18th verse to the 20th verse were narrating the story about the process of the calamity upon ʿĀd.

== In the hadith ==
There are several hadiths from various chains that became supporting materials regarding Calamity that has fallen upon the ʿĀd peoples, such as:

- Abd al-Aziz al-Tarifi commented in the Aqida al-Khurasaniyya on a hadith narrated by Abu Sa'id al-Khudri, in which Muhammad warned about the Kharijites: "From this one's lineage, there will emerge people who recite the Quran, but it will not go beyond their throats. They will separate themselves from Islam and leave the idol worshippers unharmed; if I live to see them, I will surely kill them as ʿĀd were killed (by Hud)." This hadith is recorded in Sahih al-Bukhari, Sahih Muslim, Al-Nasa'i, and Sunan Abi Dawud, and was graded authentic by Al-Albani (d. 1999). "They will separate themselves from Islam and leave the idol worshippers unharmed; if I live to see them, I will surely kill them as ʿĀd were killed (by Hud)."
- Another mention of the calamity of 'Ad from Hadith came from the narration of Ibn Abbas and recorded in Sahih al-Bukhari and Sahih Muslim during the Battle of the Trench, when the Quraysh's coalition army encampment were struck by storm, that Muhammad as said: "I have been made victorious with as-Saba (easterly wind) and the people of 'Ad were destroyed by ad-Dabur (westerly wind)."

== Place of burial ==
Several sites are revered as the tomb of Hud. The most noted site, Qabr Hud, is located in a village in Hadhramaut, Yemen, and is a place of frequent Muslim pilgrimage. Robert Bertram Serjeant, in his study of the pilgrimage rite to the tomb of Hud, verified on the spot the facts related by Al-Harawi, who described, at the gate of the Mosque, on the west side, the rock onto which Hud climbed to make the call to prayer, and mentioned the grotto of Balhut at the bottom of the ravine. Around the tomb and neighborhood, various ancient ruins and inscriptions have been found. However, as is often the case with the graves of prophets, other locations have been listed. A possible location for his qabr (Arabic: قَبْر, romanized: grave) is said to be near the Zamzam Well in Saudi Arabia, or in the south wall of the Umayyad Mosque in Syria. Some scholars have added that the Masjid has an inscription stating: Haḏā Maqām Hūd (Arabic: هَٰذَا مَقَام هُوْد, romanized: This is (the) Tomb of Hud); others, however, suggest that this belief is a local tradition spewing from the reverence the locals have for Hud.

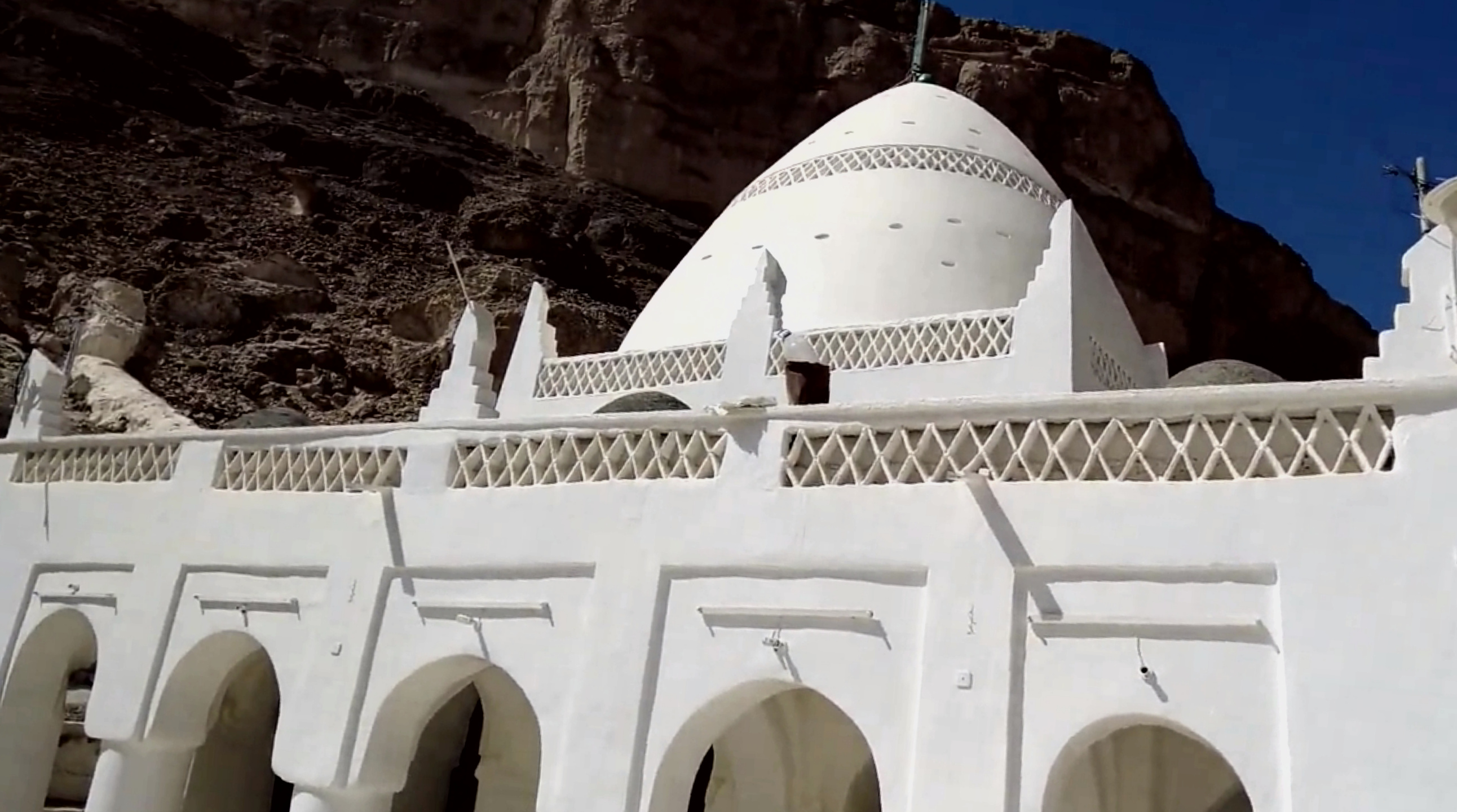
Qabr Hud in the governorate of Hadhramaut, Yemen

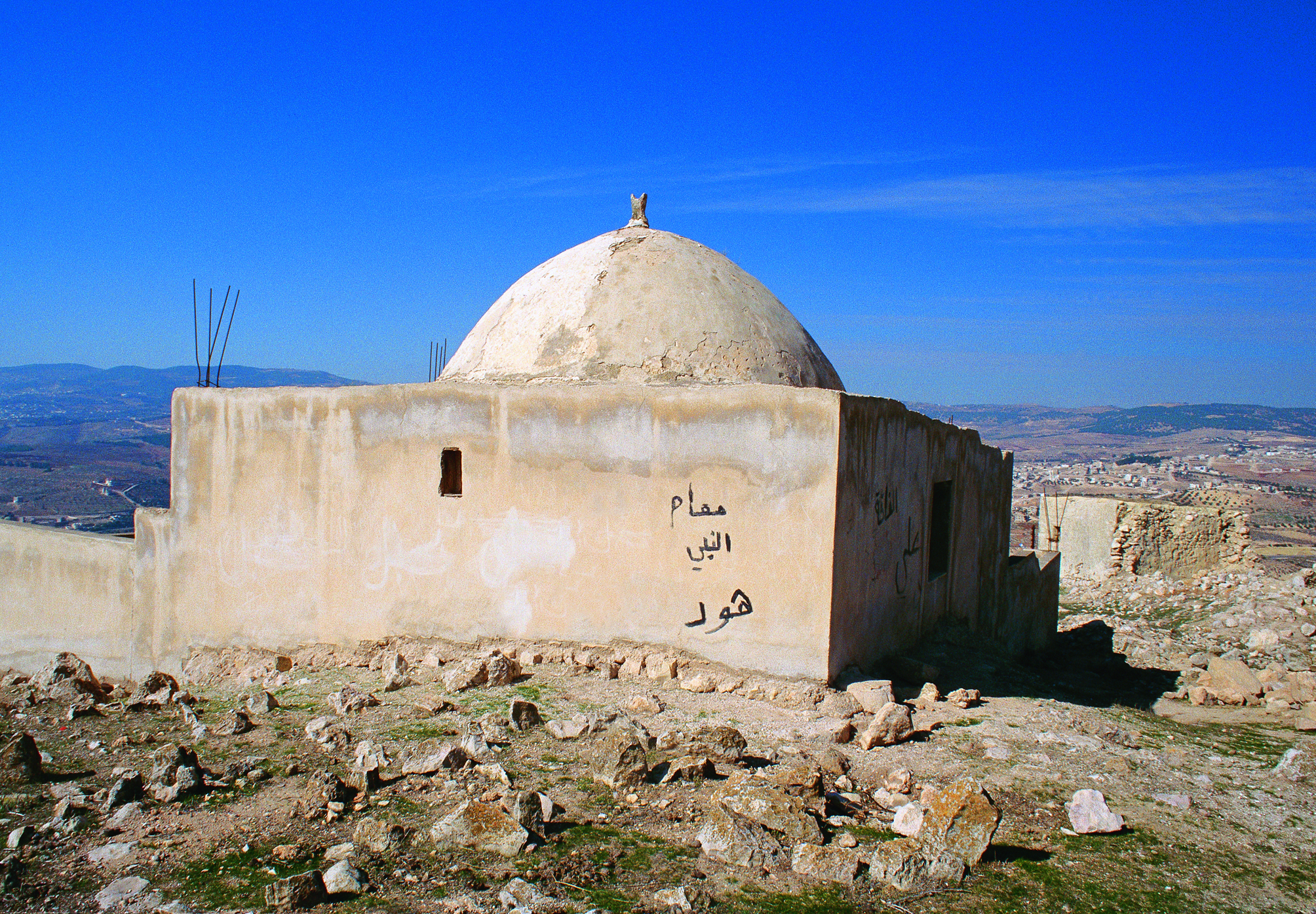
Maqam of Hud in Jordan, the Levant

== In other religions ==
Hud is referred to in the Baháʼí Faith as a Prophet who appeared after Noah and prior to Abraham, who exhorted the people to abandon idolatry and practice monotheism. His endeavors to save His people resulted in their "willful blindness" and His rejection.

Judaism and Christianity do not venerate Hud as a prophet and, as a figure, he is absent from the Bible. However, there are several pre-Quranic references in Palmyrene inscription to individuals named Hud or possessing a name which is connected to Hud as well as references to the people of ʿĀd.

== See also ==
- Biblical narratives in the Quran
- List of legends in the Quran
- Muhammad in Islam
- Qisas al-Anbiya

== Bibliography ==
=== References in the Qur'an ===
- ʿĀd people built their land: 7:69, 26:133-134, 89:7-8
- Arrogance of the ʿĀd people: 41:15, 26:128-129,
- Hud's prophecy: 7:65-72, 11:50-57, 23:32 26:124-127, 26:131-132, 26:135, 46:21-23
- Persecution of Hud: 7:66-67, 11:53-55, 14:9, 26:136-137 38:12, 46:21, 50:13, 54:18
- Destruction of ʿĀd: 7:72, 11:58, 11:89, 23:41, 25:38, 26:139, 29:38, 29:40, 40:31, 41:13, 41:16, 46:24-25, 51:41-42, 53:50, 54:19-20, 69:6-8, 89:6
