= Land of Uz =

Location mentioned in the Hebrew Bible

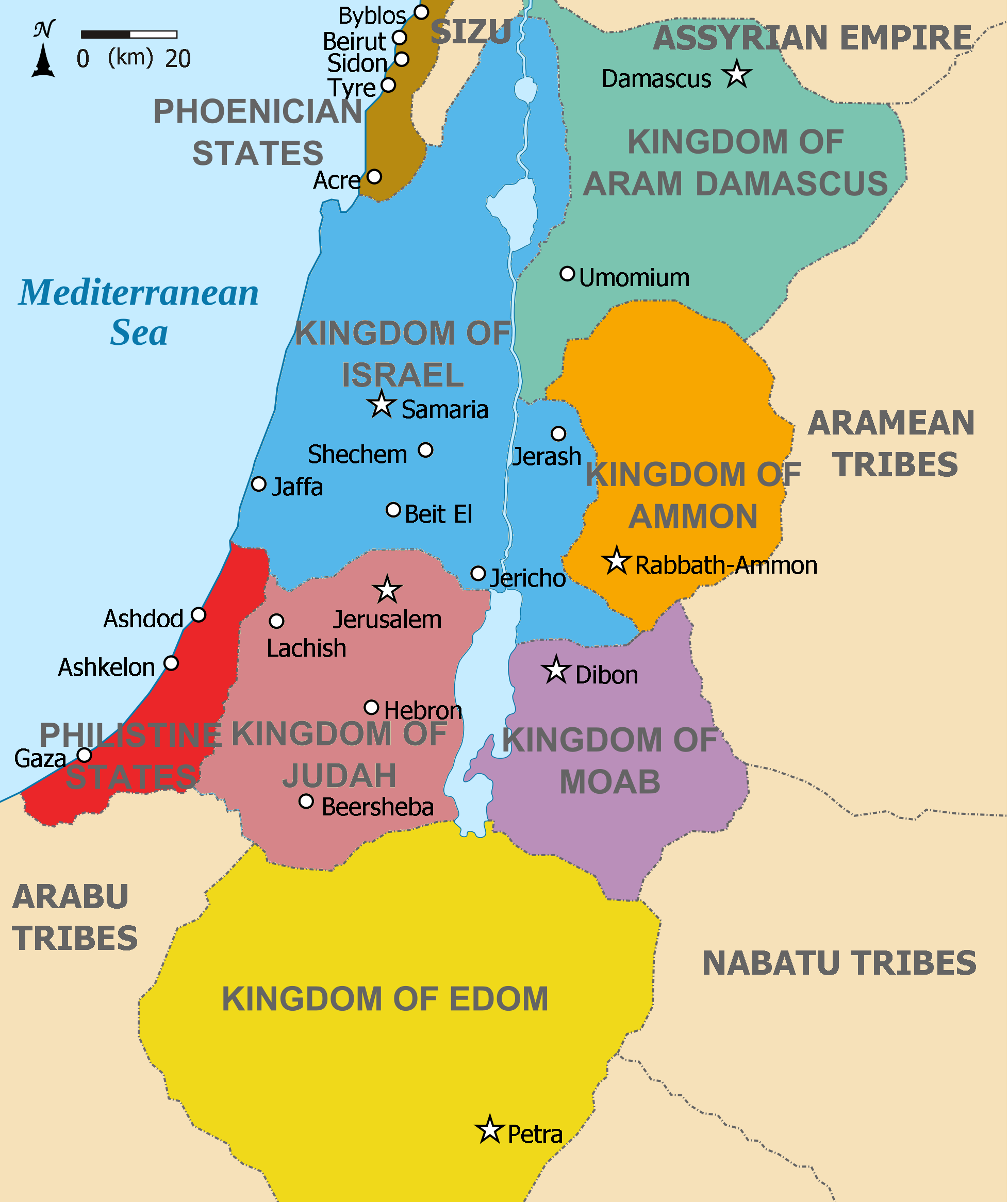
Uz has often been identified as either Aram in modern-day Syria (teal) or Edom in modern-day Jordan (yellow).

The land of Uz (Hebrew: אֶרֶץ־עוּץ – ʾereṣ-ʿŪṣ) is a location mentioned in the Hebrew Bible, most prominently in the Book of Job, which begins, "There was a man in the land of Uz, whose name was Job".

The name "Uz" is used most often to refer to Uz, son of Aram, presumably the region's namesake. He is mentioned repeatedly in the Bible, in the books of Genesis and 1 Chronicles. It is most often theorized that the Land of Uz is located in either Aram, Edom, or both.

== Location ==
It has been long debated if Uz is in either Aram or Edom. In the Bible, Genesis 10:23, Genesis 22:21 and 1 Chronicles 1:42 mention Aram, son of Shem, whose firstborn son is named Uz. Thus, Rashi places Uz in Aram. According to the War Scroll (one of the Dead Sea Scrolls) the land of Uz existed beyond the Euphrates, possibly in relation to Aram. In column 2 verse 11, the War Scroll says,

"they shall fight against the rest of the sons of Aramea: Uz, Hul, Togar, and Mesha, who are beyond the Euphrates."

Assyrologist K.L. Younger has suggested that a possible extrabiblical attestation of Uz might occur in a copy of Esarhaddon's Succession Treaty discovered at Tell Tayinat, which Younger (2023) reconstructs as referring to "the city and land of ˹Usî" in modern-day Syria.

Edom was roughly in the area of modern-day southwestern Jordan and southern Israel. Lamentations 4:21 reads:

"Rejoice and be glad, Oh daughter of Edom, that dwellest in the land of Uz."

According to the Book of Job, Job lived "in the land of Uz". Jeremiah 25 lists nations including Uz and Edom, but not Aram, supporting the identification of Uz with Aram. Job has often been identified as the Jobab mentioned in Genesis 36:33, king of Edom and great-grandson of Esau.

It is also possible that there were two distinct locations, both known as the Land of Uz, one in Edom and another in Aram.

=== Other interpretations ===
Some scholars hold that Uz is a fictional place, invented to serve as a setting for the story of Job, rather than a physical land. The word Uz in Hebrew means "counsel" or "advice", which here suggests that this story takes place in the "Land of Counsel". This fits the story, as the remainder of the book is a story about a man named Job who wrestles with his suffering, and is counseled by several men, and ultimately God.

A similar conjecture is that if Uz was a physical place, it may have been chosen as the setting for the story due to the meaning of its name.
