= Divine retribution =

Supernatural punishment by a deity

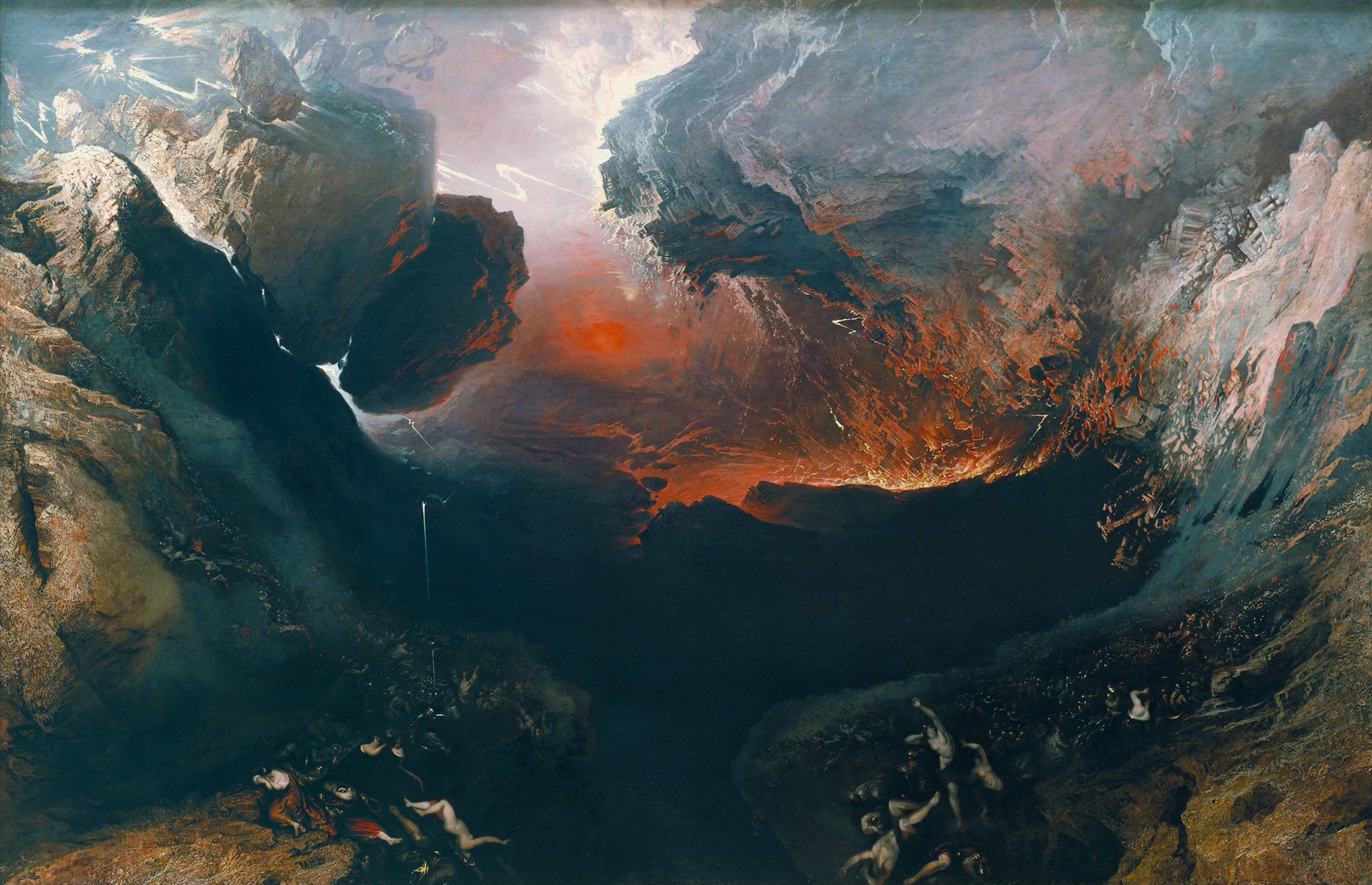
The End of the World, commonly known as The Great Day of His Wrath, an 1851–1853 oil painting on canvas by the English painter John Martin. According to Frances Carey, the painting shows the "destruction of Babylon and the material world by natural cataclysm". The painting, Carey holds, is a response to the emerging industrial scene of London as a metropolis in the early 19th century, and the original growth of the Babylon civilisation and its final destruction. According to the Tate, the painting depicts a portion of Revelation 16, a chapter from the New Testament.

Divine retribution or divine punishment is the supernatural punishment of a single person, a group of people, or everyone, by a deity in response to the invocation of their anger. Myths and folklore detailing how a deity imposed punishment on previous inhabitants of a land, causing widespread death and misfortune, can be found across many cultures.

An example of divine retribution is the story, found in many religions, about a great flood that destroys all of humanity, as described in the Epic of Gilgamesh, the Hindu Vedas, or the Hebrew Book of Genesis (6:9–8:22), but leaves one 'chosen' survivor. In the Tanakh, as well as the Old Testament and the Quran, a man named Nuh (Noah) was commanded by God to build an ark in order to survive a great flood; meanwhile, in the Epic of Gilgamesh, the survivor of this flood is Utnapishtim, and in the Hindu Vedas, it is Manu.

Other examples in biblical history include the dispersion of the builders of the Tower of Babel (Genesis 11:1–9), the destruction of Sodom and Gomorrah (Genesis 18:20–21, 19:23–28) (Quran 7:80–84), and the Ten Plagues visited upon the ancient Egyptians for persecuting the Jewish children of Israel, and to get the Egyptians to free their Hebrew slaves (Exodus, Chapters 7–12). The Bible refers to divine retribution as, in most cases, being delayed or "treasured up" to a future time. Sight of God's supernatural works and retribution would militate against faith in God's Word.

In Greek mythology, the goddess Hera often became enraged when her husband, Zeus, would impregnate mortal women, and would exact divine retribution on the children born of such affairs. In Greek versions of the myth, Medusa was turned into her monstrous form as divine retribution for her vanity; in Roman myths it was a punishment from Minerva for being raped by Neptune in Minerva's temple, which Minerva saw as a violation of her sacred place.

Some religious positions have no concept of divine retribution, nor posit a deity being capable of (or willing to express) such human sentiments as jealousy, vengeance, or wrath. For example, in Deism and Pandeism, the creator deity does not intervene in the universe at all; not for good or for bad, and therefore exhibits no such behavior. In Pantheism (as reflected in Pandeism as well), God is the universe and encompasses everything within it, and has no need for retribution, as all things against which retribution might be taken are simply within God. This view is reflected in some pantheistic or pandeistic forms of Hinduism, as well.

== Buddhism ==
The concept of divine retribution is resolutely denied in Buddhism. Gautama Buddha did not endorse belief in a creator deity, refused to express any views on creation, and stated that questions on the origin of the world are worthless. The non-adherence to the notion of an omnipotent creator deity or a prime mover is seen by many as a key distinction between Buddhism and other religions, though precise beliefs vary widely from sect to sect and "Buddhism" must not be taken as a single, holistic religious concept.

Buddhists accept the existence of beings in higher realms (see Buddhist cosmology), known as devas, which, however, are said like humans to be suffering in samsara, and are not necessarily wiser than humans on earth. The Buddha is often portrayed as a teacher of the gods, and superior to them. However, there are believed to be enlightened devas, but since there may also be unenlightened devas, there also may be godlike beings who engage in retributive acts, and if they do so, they do so out of their own ignorance of the greater truth.

Despite its nontheism, Buddhism fully accepts the theory of karma, which posits punishment-like effects, such as rebirths in realms of torment, as an invariable consequence of wrongful actions. Unlike in most Abrahamic monotheistic religions, the effects are not eternal though they can last for a very long time. Even theistic religions do not necessarily see such effects as "punishment" imposed by a higher authority, rather than natural consequences of wrongful action.

== Abrahamic Religions ==
"The wrath of God", an anthropomorphic expression for the attitude which some believe God has towards sin, is mentioned many times in the Bible.

=== Hebrew Bible ===
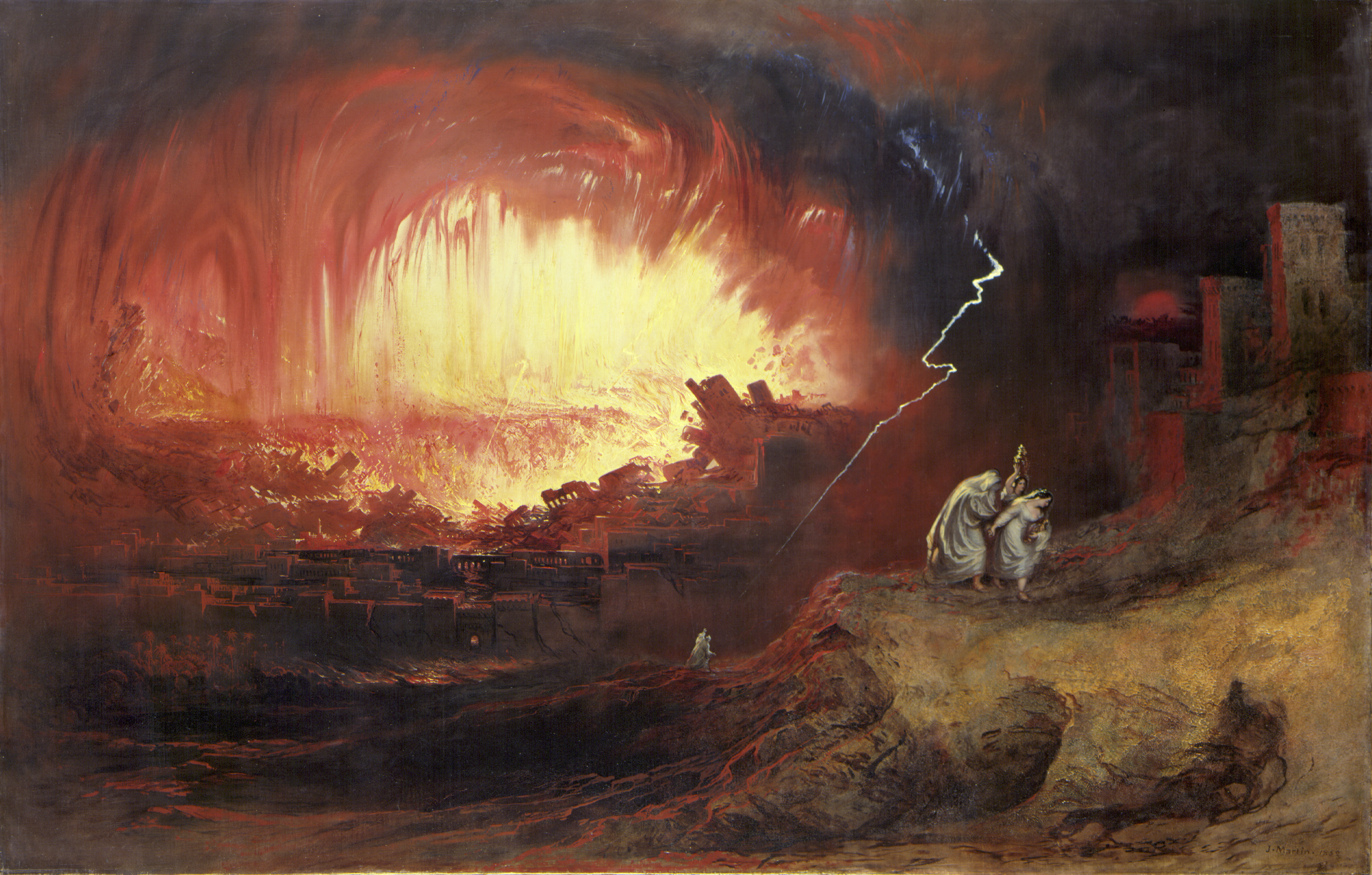
The Destruction of Sodom And Gomorrah by John Martin, 1852

Divine retribution is often portrayed in the Tanakh or Old Testament, for example:

- Genesis 3:14–24 – the curse imposed on Adam and Eve and their expulsion from the Garden of Eden on account of their disobedience
- Genesis 4:9–15 – the curse imposed on Cain after his slaying of his brother, Abel
- Genesis 6–7 – the Great Flood; rampant evil and Nephilim
- Genesis 11:1–9 – the confusion of languages at the Tower of Babel; to scatter them over the Earth
- Genesis 19:23–29 – the destruction of Sodom and Gomorrah, the plains around them, the area's vegetation and its population, with only Lot and his immediate family being saved
- Genesis 38:6–10 – the destruction of Er and Onan for their wickedness in the Lord's sight
- Exodus 7–14 – Plagues of Egypt; to establish his power over that of the gods of Egypt
- Exodus 19:10–25 – divine threats at Mount Sinai; warn that the mountain is off limits and holy
- Exodus 22:23 – God's wrath will "wax hot" against any Israelites who "afflict any widow, or fatherless child"
- Exodus 32 – plagues at the incident of the golden calf; disowning the people for breaking his covenant with them
- Leviticus 10:1–2 – Nadab and Abihu are burned; offering unauthorized fire in their censers
- Leviticus 26:14–39 – curses upon the disobedient; divine warning
- Numbers 11 – a plague accompanies the giving of manna in the wilderness; rejecting his gracious gift of heavenly food and failing his test of obedience
- Numbers 16 – the rebellion of Korah, Dathan, and Abiram – their supernatural deaths and the plague that followed; insolence and attempting self-promotion to roles they were unworthy of holding
- Numbers 20:9–13 – a reprimand is given to Moses at the water of Meribah for disobeying the Lord's instruction, showing distrust and indifference in God's presence
- Numbers 21 – the murmuring of the people and the plague of fiery flying serpent; spurning God's grace
- Numbers 25 – whoredom with the Moabites and resulting plague; breaching God's covenant through sexual immorality and worshipping other gods
- Deuteronomy 28 – curses pronounced upon the disobedient: another divine warning
- 1 Samuel 6:19 – some/many men of Beth Shemesh killed; looking into the Ark of the Covenant
- 2 Samuel 6:1–7 – Uzzah struck dead; touching the Ark of the Covenant
- 1 Kings 11 – God promises to tear King Solomon's kingdom from his son except for a single tribe; building altars to other gods for his wives
- Job 14:13 – sending trials to the just man Job

=== New Testament and Christian thought ===
The New Testament associates the wrath of God particularly with imagery of the Last Day, described allegorically in Romans 2:5 as the "day of wrath". The wrath of God is mentioned in at least twenty verses of the New Testament. Examples are:

- John 3:36 – John the Baptist declares that whoever believes in the Son has eternal life; whoever does not obey the Son, or in some English translations, does not believe the Son, shall not see life, but the wrath of God remains on him.
- Acts 5:1 – Ananias and his wife Sapphira are struck dead for holding back some of the proceeds after selling a piece of property
- Romans 1:18 – For the wrath of God is revealed from heaven against all ungodliness and unrighteousness of men, who by their unrighteousness suppress the truth.
- Romans 5:9 – Since, therefore, we have now been justified by his blood, much more shall we be saved by him from the wrath of God.
- Romans 12:19 – Beloved, never avenge yourselves, but leave it to the wrath of God, for it is written, "Vengeance is mine, I will repay, says the Lord".
- Ephesians 5:6 – Let no one deceive you with empty words, for because of these things the wrath of God comes upon the sons of disobedience.
- Revelation 6:17 – For the great day of his wrath has come, and who is able to withstand?
- Revelation 14:19 – So the angel swung his sickle across the earth and gathered the grape harvest of the earth and threw it into the great winepress of the wrath of God.
- Revelation 15:1 – Then I saw another sign in heaven, great and marvelous: seven angels having the seven last plagues, for in them the wrath of God was finished.
- Revelation 19:15 – From his mouth comes a sharp sword with which to strike down the nations, and he will rule them with a rod of iron. He will tread the winepress of the fury of the wrath of God the Almighty.

Eusebius suggests that the final illness and death of Herod the Great were examples of divine punishment for his slaughter of the innocents after the birth of Jesus. Matthew's gospel mentions Herod's death in passing. Josephus gives a more vivid portrayal of his condition and demise.

Heinrich Meyer observes in his consideration of John 3:36 that the wrath of God "remains" on anyone who rejects belief in the Son. That means that the rejection of faith is not the trigger for God's wrath but is there already. Their refusal to believe amounts to a refusal to allow the wrath of God to be lifted from them.

=== Quran ===
In Islam, the concept of divine retribution is fundamentally the principle of Jaza (recompense), affirming that Allah (God) justly and perfectly recompenses all human actions. The comprehensive system of accountability manifests through both reward for good deeds and punishment for wrongdoing. While consequences may be experienced in worldly life as trials or natural repercussions, the full measure of Jaza is delivered in the Hereafter. The doctrine’s ultimate goal is to establish absolute justice, which compels believers toward righteousness by balancing the fear of divine wrath with the hope for divine mercy.

40:17 This Day every soul will be recompensed for what it earned. No injustice today! Indeed, Allāh is swift in account.

- 11:40 ^{-Yusuf Ali}: People of Nuh (Noah) who were drowned in the flood
- 54:18–20 and 69:6–8: Ād (people of Hud) who God sent a stormy cold wind against them for seven nights and eight Days successively, which killed them all
- 54:31: Thamud (people of Salih), who killed the miraculous she-camel, so God sent against them several natural disasters, such as a storm and a powerful earthquake, thereby destroying them
- 11:81–83 and 54:37–38: Sodom and Gomorrah, who because of homosexuality, God turned the town upside down and rained on them stones. Previously when they asked Lut to leave his guests to them in order to commit the shameful act, God blinded their eyes.
- 22:42–44: People of Ibrahim (Abraham) that had divine retribution after denying Ibrahim
- 11:94 and 16:189: Dwellers of the Cities of Median and Aikah, who denied prophet Shuaib (Jethro) and in selling did notgive full measure and weight with justice, so an earthquake and blast hit them and killed them all.
- 7:130–133: Pharaoh's people were punished by Years of drought and shortage of crops. Also God sent upon them all sorts of calamities: a flood, locusts, lice, frogs and blood, a succession of signs representing Allah's wrath.
- 7:136 Pharaoh and his people, which God drowned in the sea, because they belied his signs and miracles and were heedless about them
- 28:76–81: Korah was punished due to his extreme arrogance by being swallowed by earth along with all his great material wealth.
- 7:155 and 2:55–56: 70 chosen Israelites who asked for visiting God, and were seized with a thunderbolt, and then were raised to life after death
- 7:163–165 and 2:65–66: Companions of the Sabbath who became apes, because of breaking the rule of Sabbath and fishing on that day
- 7:166–167 and 2:83–90: Israelites, when they revoltingly persisted in what they had been forbidden, the Lord announced that He would send against them those who would impose the worst torment on them until Resurrection Day
- 2:59 and 7:162: the wrongdoers of the Israelites changed The Word which was stated to them, for an irrelevant word, so God sent them a plague from the heavens due to their evildoing
- 5:12: The Israelites breaking their covenant, whom God cursed them and made their hearts Hard, so they changed the words of Torah from their right places and have forgotten a part of the Message that was sent to them
- 10:98 and 37:139–148: People of Yunus (Jonah), whom when they saw the symptoms of torment, believed God and obeyed him, so he removed from them the torment; because Yunus wasn't patient enough and left his people before God tells him to do so, a fish swallowed him; and after he admitted his wrongdoing and glorified God, God accepted his repentance and released him from the fish's belly
- 34:15–21: People of Sabaʾ(Sheba) whom because of their ingratitude, God afflicted them with a violent flood arising from a broken dam, and destroyed their productive gardens and dispersed the people
- 50:14 and 44:37: People of Tubba who were punished by God after denying their prophet
- 50:12–14 and 25:38: Companions of the Rass that rejected their messenger, so they became the subject of divine torment
- 68:17–27: Owners of the burnt garden, whom because of not giving to the poor, an affliction fell upon their garden from God, and the garden was turned into a black barren land
- 18:32–44: The owner of a beautiful garden, whom because of his arrogance and denial of the day of resurrection, an affliction fell upon their garden from God, and the garden was ruined on its trellises and its fruits were all destroyed
- 36:13–29: People of Ya-Sin: After they belied the messengers and killed the believer, there was a single and sudden divine outcry and they all became silent and Motionless corpses.
- 105:1–5: Companions of the elephant who were stoned by birds, because they wanted to destroy the Kaaba.

== Alleged modern examples ==
Since the 1812 Caracas earthquake occurred on Maundy Thursday while the Venezuelan War of Independence was raging, it was explained by royalist authorities as divine punishment for the rebellion against the Spanish Crown. The archbishop of Caracas, Narciso Coll y Prat, referred to the event as "the terrifying but well-deserved earthquake", which "confirms in our days the prophecies revealed by God to men about the ancient impious and proud cities: Babylon, Jerusalem and the Tower of Babel". That prompted the widely quoted answer of Simón Bolívar: "If Nature is against us, we shall fight Nature and make it obey".

After the 1814 burning of Washington by British forces, the American physician and abolitionist Jesse Torrey argued in A Portraiture of Slavery in the United States (1817) that the burnings were divine punishment for American slavery:

Would it be superstitious to presume, that the Sovereign Father of all nations, permitted the perpetration of this apparently execrable transaction, as a fiery, though salutary signal of his displeasure at the conduct of his Columbian children, in erecting and idolizing this... temple of freedom, and at the same time oppressing with the yoke of captivity and toilsome bondage, twelve or fifteen hundred thousand of their African brethren... making merchandize of their blood, and dragging their bodies with iron chains, even under its towering walls?

While some Orthodox Jews believe that the Holocaust was divine retribution for sins, that argument has many critics. In contrast, many Germans at the time believed that the bombing of Germany was divine retribution for the November pogrom although seeing the bombings as divine retribution became less popular after the war.

The 1953 Waco tornado outbreak, in the United States, was regarded by some people in the local African-American community as divine retribution for the lynching of Jesse Washington over thirty years prior.

On an episode of The 700 Club two days after the 9/11 terror attacks, Rev. Jerry Falwell blamed "the pagans, and the abortionists, and the feminists, and the gays and the lesbians who are actively trying to make that an alternative lifestyle" to which host Pat Robertson replied, "I totally concur". Soon thereafter, a White House spokesman said of President George W. Bush, "He does not share those views, and believes that those remarks are inappropriate". Falwell ultimately apologized for his remarks: "I would never blame any human being except the terrorists, and if I left that impression with gays or lesbians or anyone else, I apologize".

Various Christian, Jewish, and Muslim religious leaders claimed that Hurricane Katrina was God's punishment on New Orleans, the United States, or the world for any of a variety of alleged sins, including abortion, sexual immorality (including the gay pride event Southern Decadence), the policies of American imperialism, failure to support Israel, and failure of black people to study the Torah.

The 2007 United Kingdom floods were claimed by Graham Dow to be God's punishment against homosexuals.

Televangelist Pat Robertson stirred up controversy again after claiming that the 2010 Haiti earthquake may have been God's belated punishment on Haitians for allegedly having made a "pact with the Devil" to overthrow the French during the Haitian Revolution. Yehuda Levin, an Orthodox Jewish rabbi, linked the earthquake to gays in the military via an alleged Talmudic teaching that homosexuality causes earthquakes. Levin posted a video on YouTube the same day as the 2011 Virginia earthquake in which he said, "The Talmud states, 'You have shaken your male member in a place where it doesn't belong. I too, will shake the Earth.'" He said that homosexuals should not take it personally: "We don't hate homosexuals. I feel bad for homosexuals. It's a revolt against God and literally, there's hell to pay".

Chaplain John McTernan said that Hurricane Isaac, like Hurricane Katrina, was God's punishment on homosexuals. Buster Wilson of the American Family Association concurred with that statement. McTernan also said that Hurricane Sandy may have been God's punishment against homosexuals. In addition, WorldNetDaily columnist William Koenig, along with McTernan himself, suggested that American support for a two-state solution to the Israeli-Palestinian conflict had led to the hurricane.

Malaysian politician Ahmad Zahid Hamidi called the 2018 Central Sulawesi earthquake and tsunami "God's (Allah) rage against homosexuals in Indonesia because they were allowed to live in Indonesia".

Orthodox Rabbi Shmuel Eliyahu stated that the 2023 Turkey–Syria earthquakes were acts of rivine retribution and that "God is judging all the nations around us who wanted to invade our land and throw us into the sea". Iraqi Shia cleric Muqtada al-Sadr said the deadly earthquakes were "God's (Allah) rebuke against Turkey because [of] weak response against the holy book (Quran) burning by right wing extremist groups in Sweden". Islamic State officials in their propaganda narrative called the deadly eathquakes "God's (Allah) rage against Turkey for renounced Sharia laws, replaced it with unbeliever (Kuffar) laws and enforced it, adopted unbeliever lifestyles, declared war against ISIS and allied with the army of unbelievers (NATO)".

=== Rebuttals ===
Orthodox Rabbi Shmuley Boteach denounces such claims since they carry the implication of victim blaming and wrote, "For many of the faithful, the closer they come to God, the more they become enemies of man". He contrasts the Jewish tradition, which affords a special place for "arguing with God", with an approach to religion that "taught people not to challenge, but to submit. Not to question, but to obey. Not how to stand erect, but to be stooped and bent in the broken posture of the meek and pious". Speaking about the COVID-19 pandemic, Boteach said "I utterly reject and find it sickening when people believe that this is some kind of punishment from God – that really upsets me".

A Jesuit priest, James Martin, stated on Twitter in response to Hurricane Sandy, "If any religious leaders say tomorrow that the hurricane is God's punishment against some group, they're idiots. God's ways are not our ways".

== See also ==
- Apocalypse
- Apocalyptic and post-apocalyptic fiction
- Apocalyptic literature
- Act of God
- Collective punishment
- Confirmation bias
- Divine judgment
- Divine providence
- Eschatology
- Eye for an eye
- Frontier justice
- Just-world fallacy
- Karma
- Law of the jungle
- Mills of God
- Nemesis
- Penal substitution
- Retribution (poem)
- Retributive justice
- Societal collapse
- Spirit away
