= Q46 =

Q46 may refer to:

- Q46 (New York City bus)
- Al-Ahqaf, a surah of the Quran
- French submarine Turquoise (Q46)
