= Qabr Hud =

Qabr Hud Arabic: قَبْر هُوْد Shiʿb Hūd
- Village
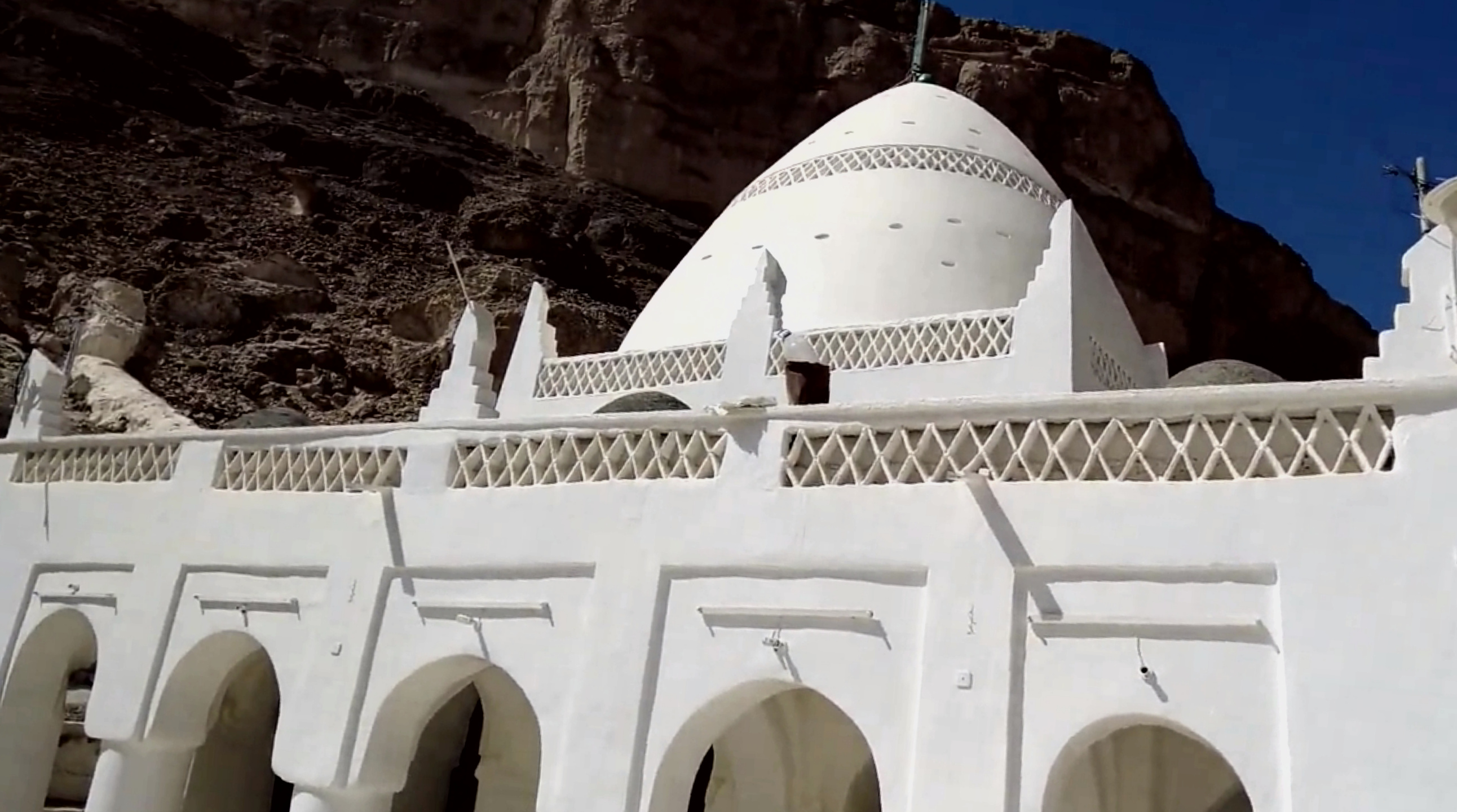
- The tomb of the Islamic prophet Hud

- Location in Yemen Qabr Hud (Middle East) Qabr Hud (West and Central Asia)
- Coordinates: 16°6′6.05″N 49°34′6.41″E
- Country: Yemen
- Governorate: Hadhramaut
- District: As Sawm
- Time zone: UTC+3 (Arabia Standard Time)

Qabr Hud (Arabic: قَبْر هُوْد, romanized: Qabr Hūd, lit. 'Grave of Hud'), or Shiʽb Hūd (Arabic: شِعْب هُوْد), is a village situated in the Yemeni Governorate of Hadhramaut. It is the traditional burial site of the Islamic prophet Hud, who is mentioned in the Qur'an.

== Pilgrimage ==
The annual pilgrimage takes place between the 11th and 15th days of Sha'ban.

Robert Bertram Serjeant, in his study of the pilgrimage rite to the tomb of Hud, verified on the spot the facts related by Al-Harawi, who described at the gate of the Mosque, on the west side, the rock onto which Hud climbed to make the call to prayer, and mentioned the grotto of Balhut at the bottom of the ravine. Around the tomb and neighborhood, various ancient ruins and inscriptions have been found.

== Geography ==
Qabr Hud is located on the southern bank of Wadi al-Masilah, 60 km (37 mi) east of Tarim.
