= Wheels of justice =

The wheels of justice alludes to the legal proverb "The wheels of justice turn slowly, but grind exceedingly fine".

It may also refer to:

- 18 Wheels of Justice, an American action drama television series (2000–2001)
- The Wheels of Justice, a silent drama film (1915)
