= Hul (biblical figure) =

Minor biblical figure

In the Book of Genesis, Hul (Hebrew: חוּל Ḥūl) is the son of Aram, son of Shem, who is mentioned twice in the Tanakh, both times in genealogies. According to the 1st century Jewish historian Flavius Josephus, he founded Armenia. A variant tradition in some mediaeval texts assigning rather the "Lydians" as the offspring of Hul may be traced to Hippolytus of Rome (c. 230). Because Hul's father is Aram, the eponymous ancestor of the Arameans (sometimes also called Syrians), the Holman Bible Dictionary infers that he must have been included in the Table of Nations as "the original ancestor of an Aramean or Syrian tribe."

Those who have searched for cuneiform references to Hul have found Urartian language inscriptions confirming the Ḫulu people beside Lake Van, as well as Ḫula in reference to the Hula Valley north of the Sea of Galilee.

Other speculations have included comparing the name to the Greek term Coele-Syria; or placing it in Southern Mesopotamia, or identifying along with Stephanus a "Cholobotene" district of Armenia said by Bochart to be from Hebrew for "House of Hul" (Hul Bet).

Australian Chinese revolutionary Tse Tsan-Tai (1914) identified his descendants with the "Malays, Burmese, Siamese and Annamites".
