= Gether =

According to the Table of Nations in the Book of Genesis in the Hebrew Bible, Gether (Hebrew: גֶּתֶר Geṯer) was the third son of Aram, son of Shem. He appears only twice in the Hebrew Bible, and both times is only mentioned in passing in genealogical lists. In the Table of Nations (Genesis 10:23), he is identified as a son of Aram, while in 1 Chronicles 1:17, he is listed among the sons of Shem.

In Islamic traditions, he (here called 'Athir') is sometimes considered the father of Thamud, whose descendant was the Islamic prophet Salih.

According to the first-century Jewish historian Josephus, Gether is an ancestor of the Bactrians. Jerome (c. 390) considers Gether the ancestor of the Acarnanians. Isidore of Seville (c. 635) makes him ancestor of the Acarnanians or Curians.

Chinese Australian revolutionary Tse Tsan-Tai makes Gether the ancestor of the indigenous peoples of Australia, Indigenous New Zealanders, and Native Hawaiians.
