= ʿĀd =

Ancient tribe mentioned in the Qurʾān

'Ād عَادٌ
- Ancient Arab tribe
- Ethnicity: Arab
- Nisba: 'Ādi
- Location: Arabian Peninsula
- Descended from: 'Ād bin 'Aws bin Iram bin Sam bin Nuh

ʿĀd (Arabic: عاد, ʿĀd) was an ancient tribe in pre-Islamic Arabia. The banū ʿĀd (people of ʿĀd) are best known for being mentioned two dozen times in the Quran, often in conjunction with Thamud. In 2025 it was shown that 'Ad was a tribe that existed two millennia ago in the Wadi Rum region of the southern Jordan.

The tribe's members, the ʿĀdites, formed a prosperous nation until they were destroyed by a violent storm. According to Islamic tradition, the storm came after they had rejected the teachings of a monotheistic prophet named Hud. 'Ad is regarded as one of the original tribes of Arabia, "The Extinct Arabs".

== Etymology ==
There is a possibility that the tribal name ʿĀd represents a misinterpretation of a common noun: the expression min al-ʿād is today understood to mean "since the time of ʿĀd", but ʿād might originally have been a common noun meaning 'antiquity', which was reinterpreted as a proper noun, inspiring of the tribe 'Ad in Islamic conception.

== Sources ==
The banū ʿĀd, or what can be interpreted and translated as referring to them, are mentioned in some Arabic poetry (though none can be confirmed to predate the Qur'an), including the work attributed to Ṭarafa and in the Mufaḍḍaliyyāt, and in material recorded by ibn Hishām; in this material they are understood as "an ancient nation that had perished".

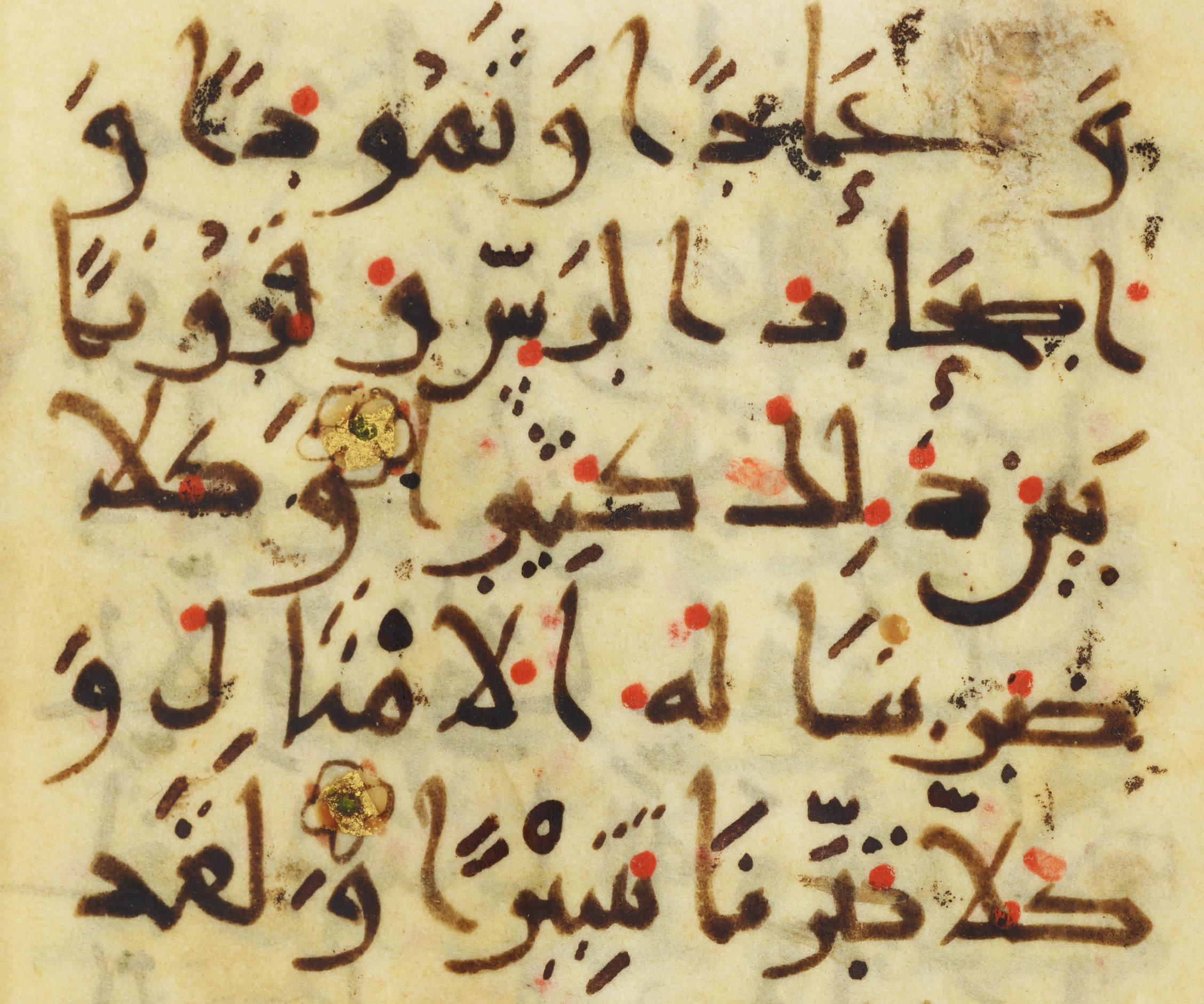
"And Ad, and Thamud, and the Companions of the Rass, and many generations between those – and to each of them We set forth parables, and each one We utterly razed. [...]"

The banū ʿĀd are mentioned twenty-four times in the Quran. According to the Quran, the ʿĀd built monuments and strongholds at every high point and their fate is evident from the remains of their dwellings. In Andrew Rippin's summary,

the tribe of ʿĀd is frequently mentioned alongside Thamūd and Noah, as in Q 9:70. A prosperous group living after the time of Noah (Q 7:69), the ʿĀd built great buildings (Q 26:128) associated with the aḥqāf (Q 46:21), understood as the "sand dunes" and identified by tradition as a place in the south of Arabia ... Hūd and other prophets were sent to the people of ʿĀd but they rejected him; they were then destroyed by a violent wind (Q 41:16, 46:24, 51:41, 54:19, 69:6) that lasted for a week and left only their buildings standing. The remnant of the tribe who survived, were the followers of Hūd (Q 7:72, 11:58).

== History and location ==
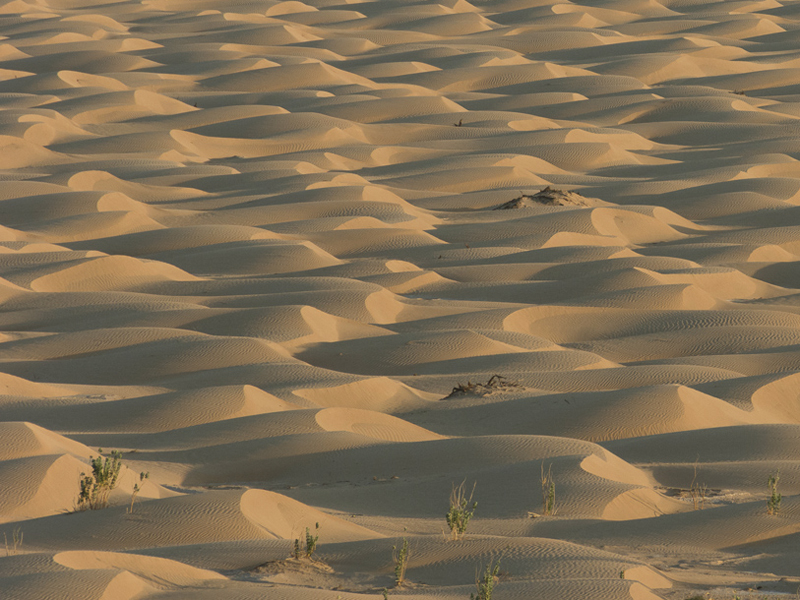
Sand dunes in Ar-Rub' Al-Khali (The Empty Quarter), Oman

As of 2012, the historicity of the tribe of ʿĀd was an unanswered question. The lines referring to 'Ad in pre-Islamic poetry were of disputed authenticity and while some nineteenth-century scholars suggested identifying 'Ad with the better known Iyād, or with a tribe allegedly mentioned by Ptolemy known as the Oadites, these suggestions have not been successful. Related issues pertain to the geographical location of 'Ad. In later folklore, multiple attempts have been made to identify the location of 'Ad, including based on the statement that they were at the "winding tracts of sands" (46:21). The most common location proposed in traditional sources is in South Arabia, but alternative opinions have also proposed the Levant, near Damascus, or even in Alexandria, in many situations based on the assumption of a relationship with the location of Iram of the Pillars. According to Andrew Rippin, "some modern speculation has associated Iram—and thus ʿĀd—with the buried city referred to as Ubar (Wabār), located at Shisur, Oman, because of the pillars found at that site."

Recently, a secure identification has been made between Iram and a region in northern Arabia and Wadi Rum in the desert of southern Jordan. The place, in combination with the place-names found attested to by inscriptions from the region, are compatible with the al-ʾaḥqāf, "winding tracts" description of 'Ad in 46:21. Subsequently, it was also shown that three pre-Islamic Arabian inscriptions (two in Hismaic, one in Safaitic) mention the tribe of 'Ad in the same area. Therefore, it is now widely accepted that both Iram and 'Ad belonged to the Wadi Rum area of the southern Jordan.

== In Islam ==
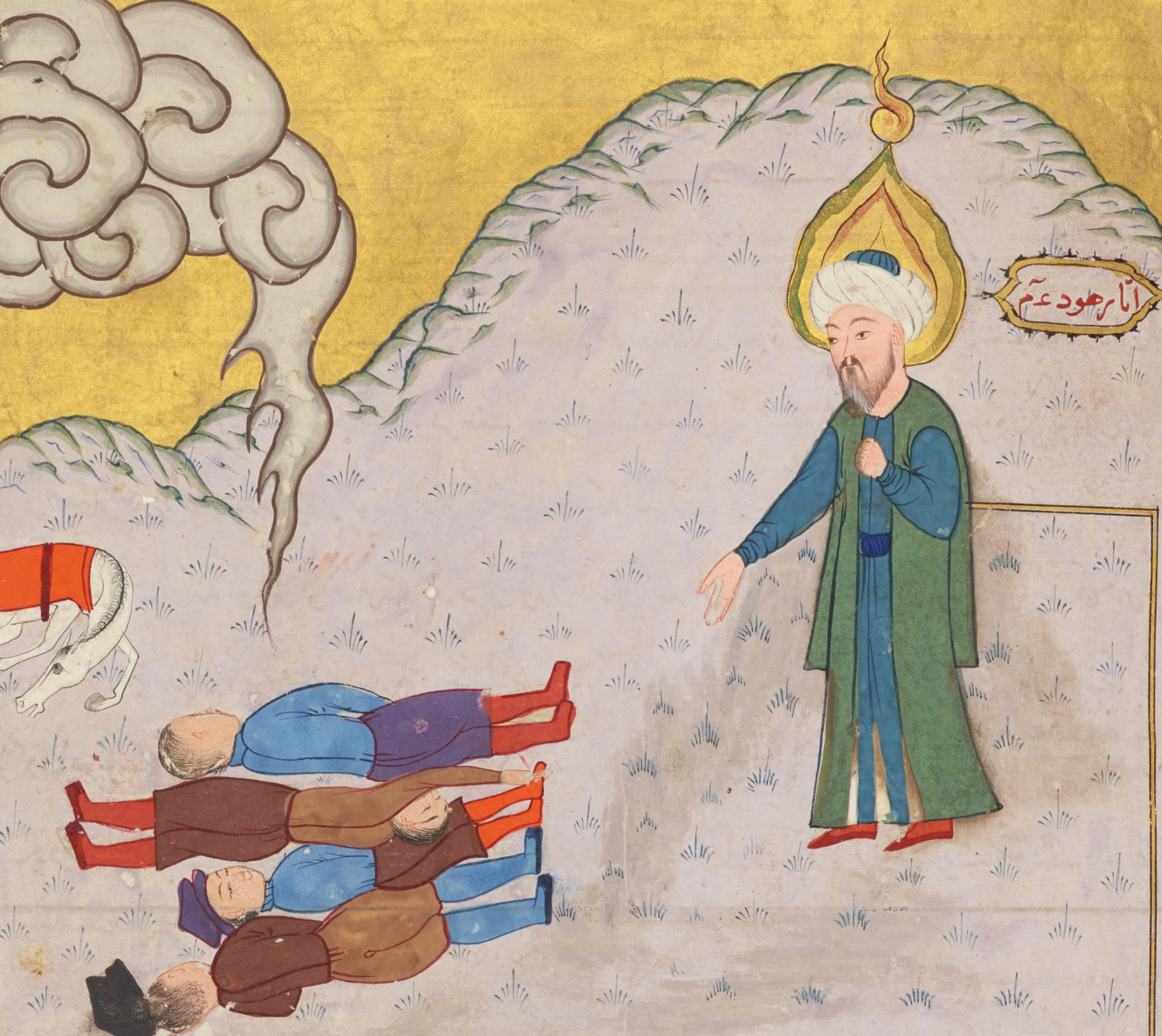
Hud gazes over piles of cadavers after God smote the banu 'Ad and their beasts by means of a divine storm.

According to Islamic tradition, the tribes of Hud and 'Ad are both linked to an eponymous, legendary king named ʽAd, but modern scholarship has discarded the idea of such a king. ʿĀd came from the northeast of Arabia, more exactly Iraq, and was the progenitor of the Adites, as well as the son of Uz (عوض), who was the son of Aram (إرم), who was the son of Shem, the son of Noah (سام بن نوح). Therefore, Noah (نوح) is said to be ʽAd's great-great-grandfather. After ʽAd's death, his sons Shadid and Shedad reigned in succession over the Adites. ʿĀd then became a collective term for all those descended from ʽAd. The 9th-century historian Al-Masudi reported that: "There was no people on earth who could be compared to [ʿĀd] in strength, in the grandeur of their works, in the vigor of their spirit, in the power of their character. Destruction had no hold on their bodies, so strongly had nature constituted them, so solid was their structure, so perfect was their form, as God himself revealed."

== Sources ==
- Al-Jallad, Ahmad (2025). "The Epigraphy of the Tribe of ʿĀd". Athīrat: Journal of Ancient Arabia. 1 (1–2): 281–289. doi:10.1163/30504880-12340015. ISSN 3050-4880.
