= Mills of God =

Aphorism about divine retribution

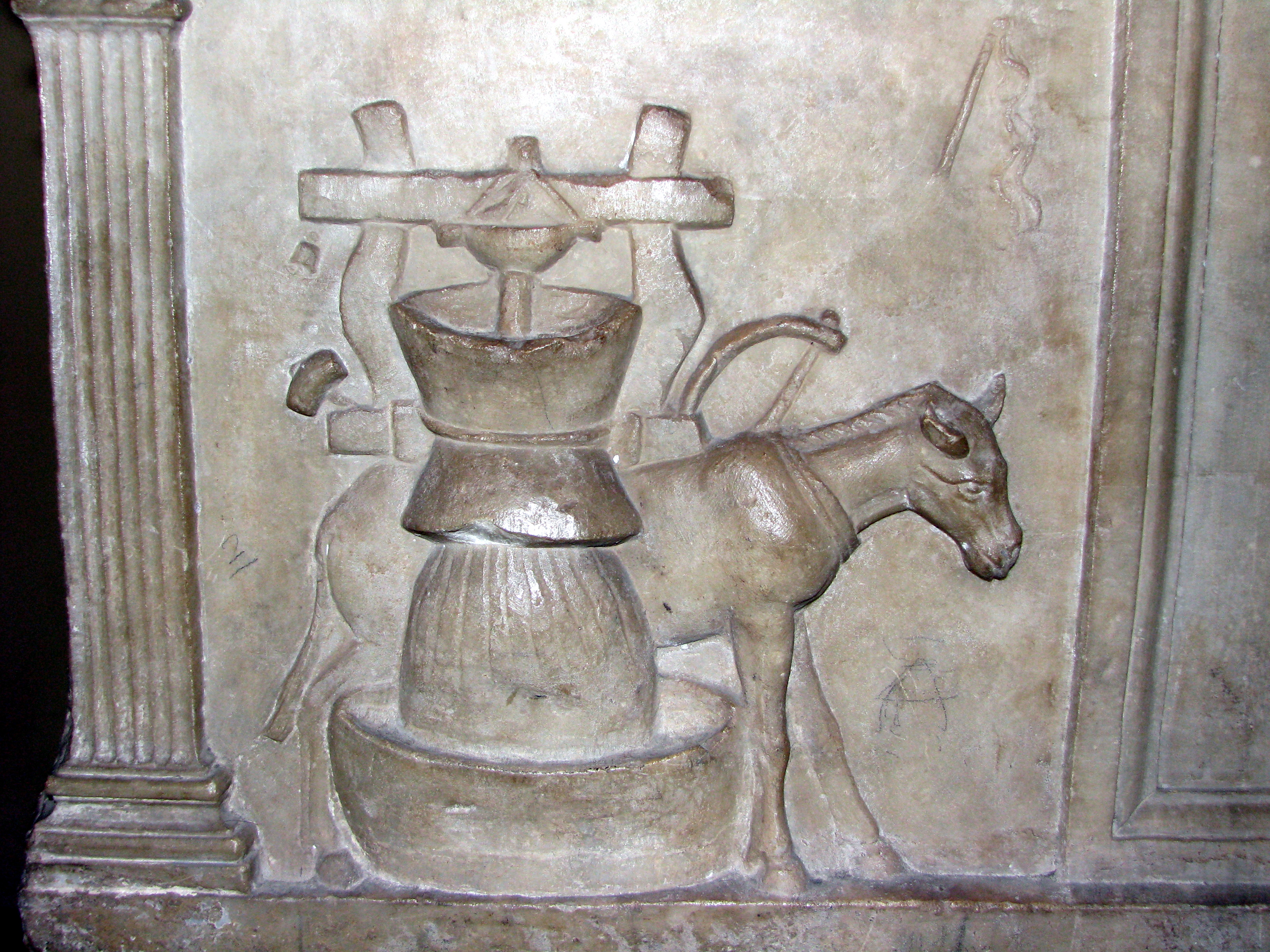
Roman-era depiction of an animal-driven flour mill.

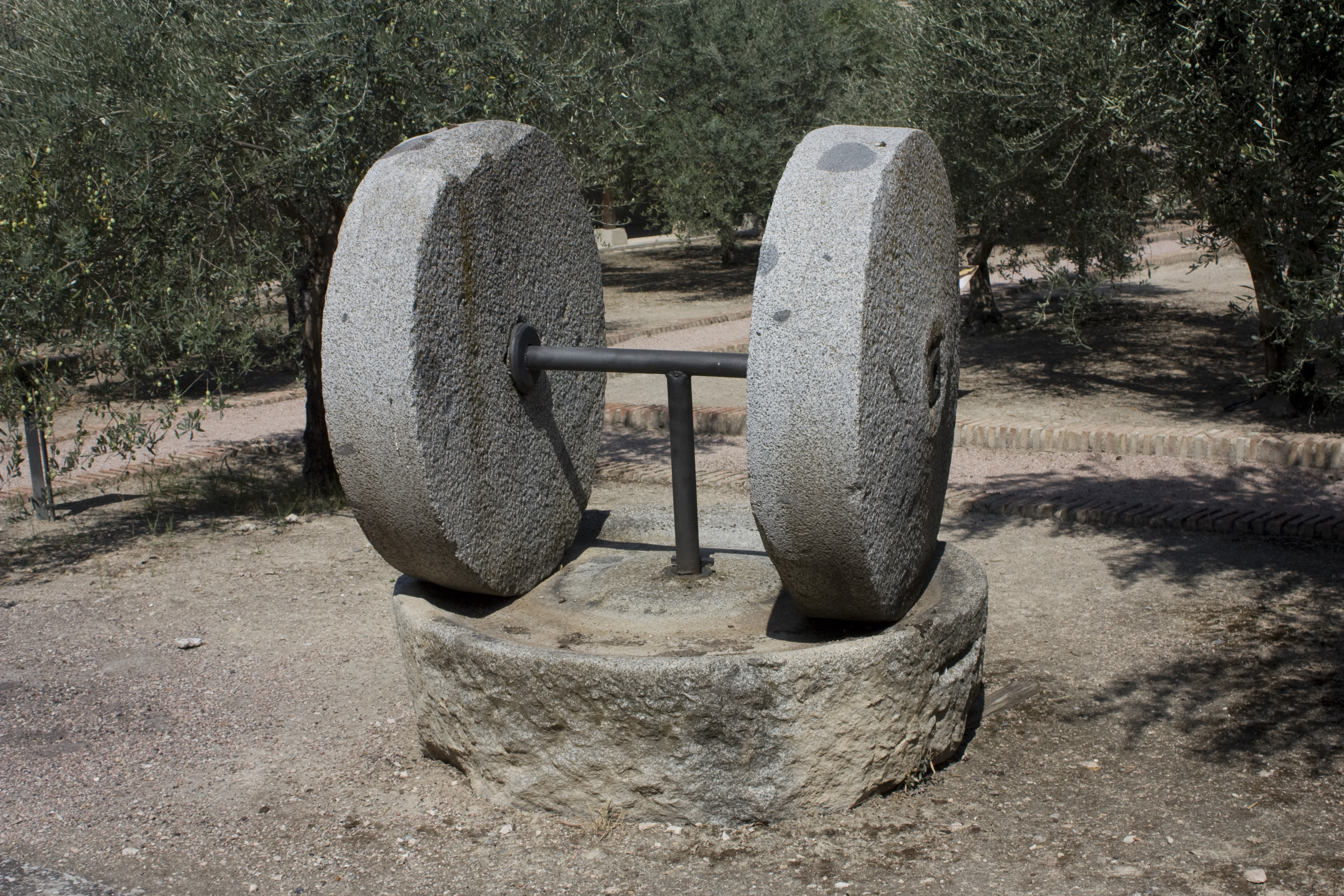
An edge mill with two millstones. Katherine Maltwood portrayed a similar arrangement in her bronze, The Mills of God (1918/9), which was inspired by the suffering of the Great War.

The proverbial expression the mills of God grind slowly signifies slow but certain divine retribution.

== Ancient Greek usage ==
Plutarch (1st century CE) alludes to the metaphor as a then-current adage in his Moralia (De sera numinis vindicta 'On the Delay of Divine Vengeance'):

Thus, I do not see what use there is in those mills of the gods said to grind so late as to render punishment hard to be recognized, and to make wickedness fearless.

Plutarch no doubt here makes reference to a hexameter by an unknown poet, cited by sceptic philosopher Sextus Empiricus (2nd century) in his Adversus Grammaticos as a popular adage:

Ὀψὲ θεῶν ἀλέουσι μύλοι, ἀλέουσι δὲ λεπτά.
The millstones of the gods grind late, but they grind fine.

This expression was invoked by Celsus in his (lost) True Discourse where, defending the concept of ancestral fault, "a priest of Apollo or of Zeus" says:

Ὀψὲ, φησι, θεῶν ἀλέουσι μύλοι, κἆϛ παίδων παῖδας τοί κεν μετόπισθε γένωνται.
"Late", he says, "do the mills of the gods grind, and down to the children of children, and to those who are born after them."

The Sibylline Oracles (c. 175) have Sed mola postremo pinset divina farinam ("but the divine mill will at last grind the flour").

== In 16th and 17th century Europe ==
The proverb was in frequent use in the Protestant Reformation, often as the Latin Sero molunt deorum molae 'slowly grind the mills of the gods' due to Erasmus of Rotterdam (Adagia, 1500), but also in German.

An Italian variation of 1666 reads

Il molin di Dio macina adaggio, mà amara n'è la semola
God's mill grinds slowly, but bitter is his bran.

The expression was anthologised in English by George Herbert in his collection of proverbs Jacula Prudentum (1652) as "God's mill grinds slow but sure" (no. 743). The German epigrammatist Friedrich von Logau, in his Sinngedichte (c. 1654), composed an extended variant under the title "Göttliche Rache" (divine retribution),

Gottes Mühlen mahlen langsam, mahlen aber trefflich klein,
ob aus Langmut er sich säumet, bringt mit Schärf 'er alles ein.

translated by Henry Wadsworth Longfellow ("Retribution", Poetic Aphorisms, 1846):

Though the mills of God grind slowly; Yet they grind exceeding small;
Though with patience He stands waiting, With exactness grinds He all.

== Modern usage ==
Arthur Conan Doyle quotes the proverb in A Study in Scarlet:

. . . "...the Lord stretched out His hand and gathered you into the true fold."
"As He will all the nations in His own good time," said the other in a nasal voice; "He grindeth slowly but exceeding small."...

The proverb is quoted by characters in Agatha Christie's Hercule Poirot's Christmas and A Pocket Full of Rye in reference to the deaths of the victims. It is also quoted in W. Somerset Maugham's The Moon and Sixpence where it is used, somewhat piously, by a family member to imply a certain justice in the demise of the central character Charles Strickland,

When I had narrated his lamentable death I ceased. For a minute or two we were all silent. Then Robert Strickland struck a match and lit a cigarette. "The mills of God grind slowly, but they grind exceeding small," he said, somewhat impressively.

— W. Somerset Maugham, "The Moon and Sixpence" (1919)

During the Second World War, both Winston Churchill and Franklin Roosevelt quoted Longfellow when promising retribution for the extermination of the Jews.

=== As phrasal template ===
The expression has become a phrasal template, with various words being substituted for "God":

- "The wheels of government usually grind slowly..." (1841)
- "...the wheels of Chinese statesmanship grind slowly" (1890)
- "The wheels of progress grind slowly in Japan, but they grind exceeding sure." (1894)
- "The wheels of Congress grind slow, but in time they turn out what the farmers of the nation demand." (1909)

==== The wheels of justice ====
The most common version today mentions "justice", in the legal proverb "The wheels of justice turn slowly, but grind exceedingly fine" (1920).

- "If the mills of the Gods grind slowly, what shall we say of the wheels of justice?" (1890).
- "...the wheels of justice are pursuing their slow grind." (1896)
- "...the wheels of justice may grind slowly, but they are grinding, grinding with unerring truth." (1916)
- "...though the wheels of justice grind slowly and exceedingly fine, the criminal escapes and a premium is placed upon crime." (1909)

== See also ==
- Ancestral fault
- Justice delayed is justice denied
