= Companions of the Rass =

Ancient community mentioned in the Qur'an

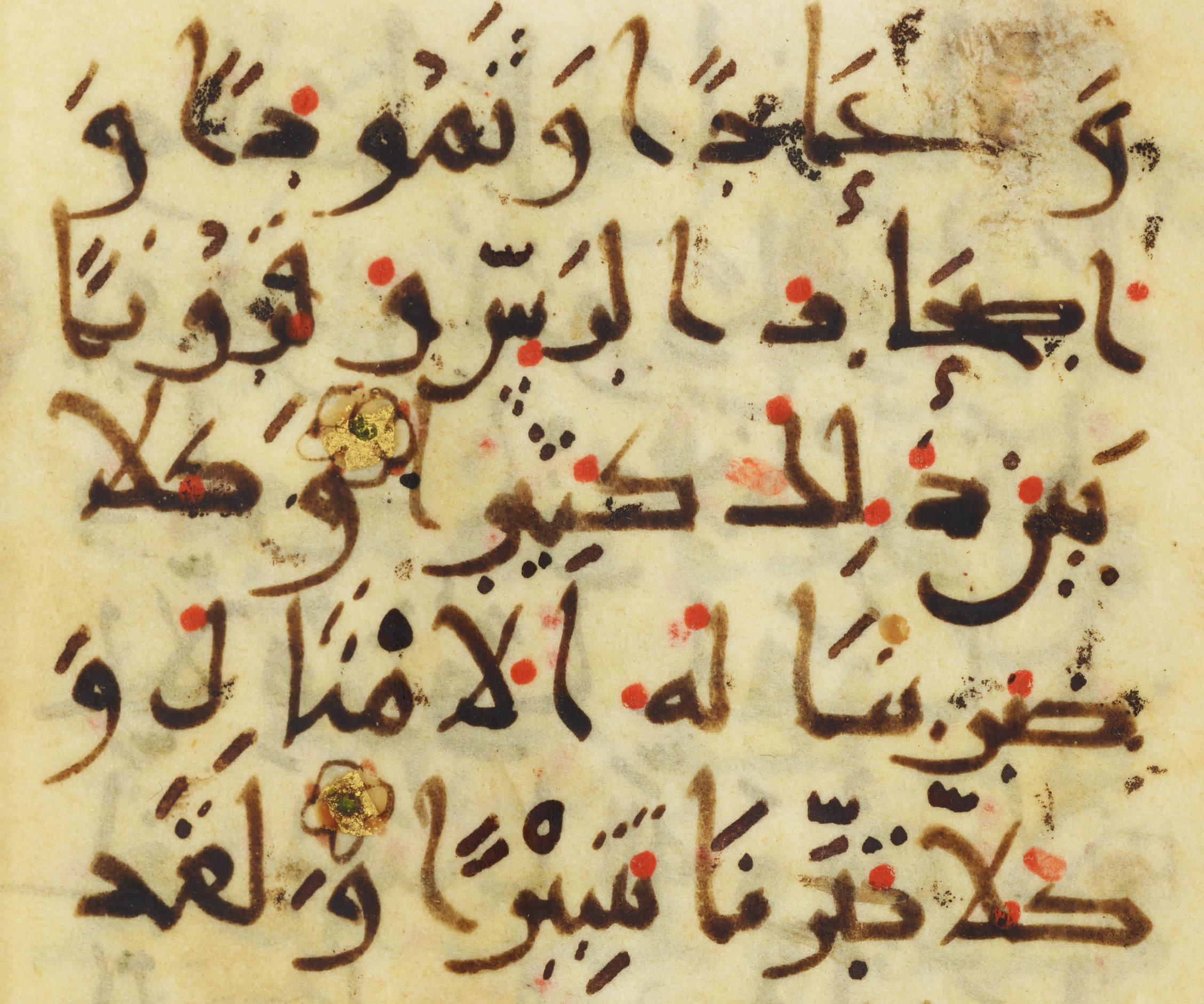
"And Ad, and Thamud, and the Companions of the Rass, and many generations between those – and to each of them We set forth parables, and each one We utterly razed. [...]"

The Companions of the Rass, also known as the People of the Well or the People of Ar-Rass, were an ancient community, who are mentioned in the Qur'an. The Qur'an provides little information concerning them other than to list them with other communities, including ʿĀd, Thamud, the People of Noah and others; the Qur'an groups all these communities together as nations who went astray and were perished for their sins.

The Qur'an does not identify their location. Muslim commentators proposed several locations, including Al-Yamama and southern Arabia, Midian, Antioch, and Azerbaijan. A South Arabian tradition preserved by al-Hamdani placed al-Rass between Bayhan, Marib, al-Jawf, Najran and Hadhramaut, and described its people as tribes descended from Qahtan. Their prophet was identified in this tradition as Hanzala ibn Safwan.

== Account in Exegesis ==
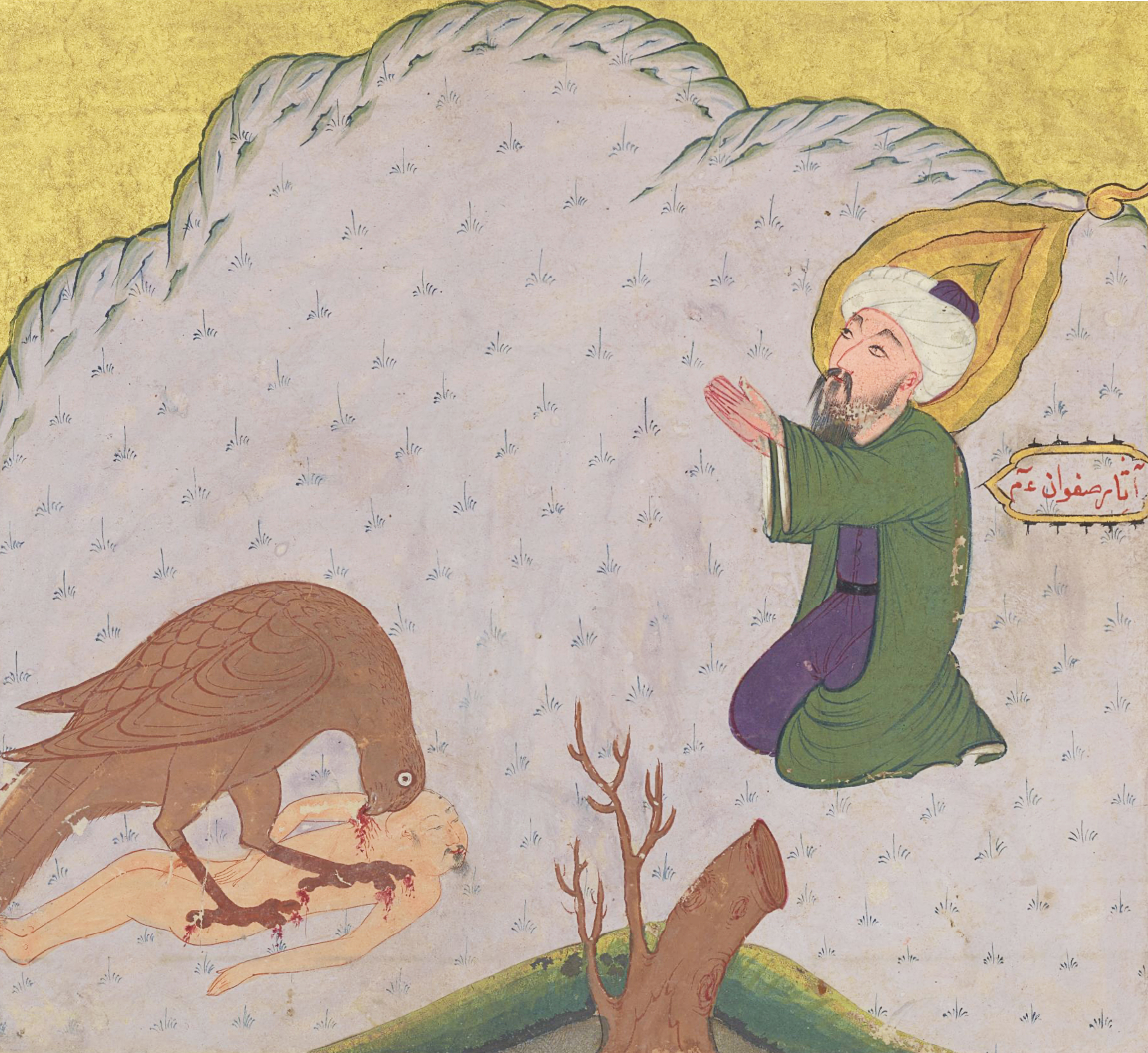
1585-1590 depiction of Safwan, father of the Islamic prophet sent to Companions of the Rass, sitting in prayer as he watches the Anqa devour a man.

Other documents of Islamic literature give little information on the place or people of this particular community. However, Ibn Kathir states in his Stories of the Prophets that the prophet sent to them was a man named Hanzalah ibn Safwan. Exegesis narrates that the people of this community threw the prophet into a well, with some accounts narrating that he died in the well and others narrating that he survived.

Modern day scholars such as Imad Zuhair Hafidh, Hikmat ibn Bashir ibn Yasin and Muhammad Sulaiman al-Ashqar, three professors of tafseer from Muhammad Sulaiman al-Ashqar has viewed that Ashab al-Rass or peoples of Rass were the peoples who lived during the time of Shuaib, a prophet of Islam.

There has been theories that People of the Well are ancestors of those now live in Russia or ancestors of modern-day Russians who refer to themselves as "Ross" or Kievan Rus who inhabited modern day Ukraine.
