= Aram, son of Shem =

Biblical figure in the Book of Genesis

Aram (Hebrew: אֲרָם Aram) is a son of Shem, according to the Table of Nations in Genesis 10 of the Hebrew Bible, and the father of Uz, Hul, Gether and Mash or Meshech. The Book of Chronicles lists Aram, Uz, Hul, Gether, and Meshech as descendants of Shem, although without stating explicitly that Aram is the father of the other four.

Aram in the Hebrew Bible has usually, as in Flavius Josephus' writings, been regarded as the eponymous ancestor of the Aramean people of ancient Syria.

== Name ==
The name Aram (אֲרָם, Aram) means etymologically "height, high region", according to Wilhelm Gesenius and "the highland" according to Strong's Concordance, in which it is referred to as Hebrew word #758.

== Masoretic Text ==
The Masoretic Text of the Hebrew Bible uses the Hebrew word ארמי ărammì for Aramean (or Syriac, some translations). Bethuel the Aramean from Padan-aram is identified as the father-in-law of Isaac. Laban the son of Bethuel is also referred to as an Aramean who lived in Haran in Padan-aram (map, bottom). Deuteronomy 26:5 might refer to the fact that both Jacob and his grandfather Abraham had lived for a time in Syria, or to Jacob being the son of a Syrian mother: "Then you shall declare before the LORD your God: 'My father was a wandering Aramean, and he went down into Egypt with a few people and lived there and became a great nation, powerful and numerous.' " (New International Version) The Hebrew word רמי rammîy is found at 2 Chronicles 22:5, also translated Aramaean or Syrian.

The land of Aram-Naharaim ("Aram of the Two Rivers") included Padan-Aram and the city of Haran (or Harran), Haran being mentioned ten times in the Bible. This region is traditionally thought to be populated by descendants of Aram, as is the nearby land of Aram that included Aram-Damascus and Aram Rehob. David wrote of his striving with Aram-Naharaim and Aram-Zobah (Psalm 60, title). Aram-Naharaim is mentioned five times in Young's Literal Translation.

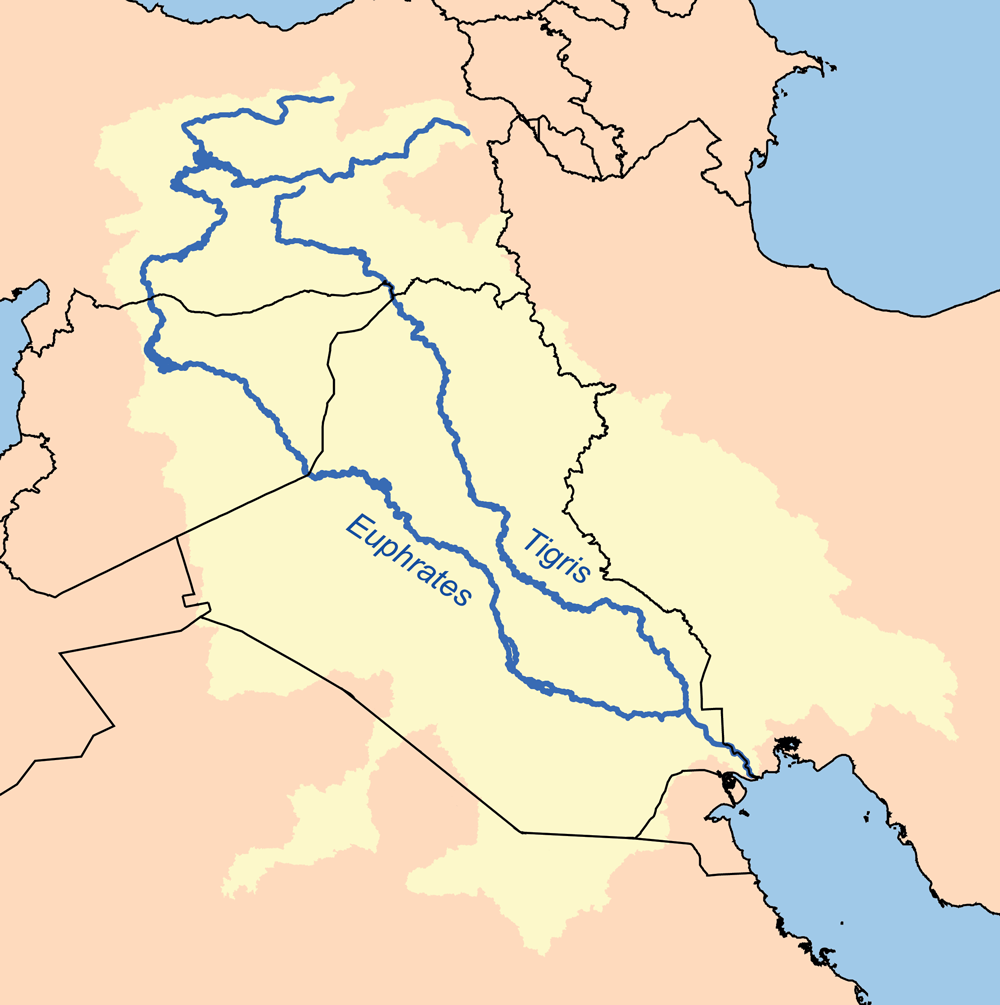
The Euphrates and Tigris Rivers flow (top left to bottom right) from Ararat (Turkey) through Aram (Syria), to Assyria (Iraq), and into the Persian Gulf.

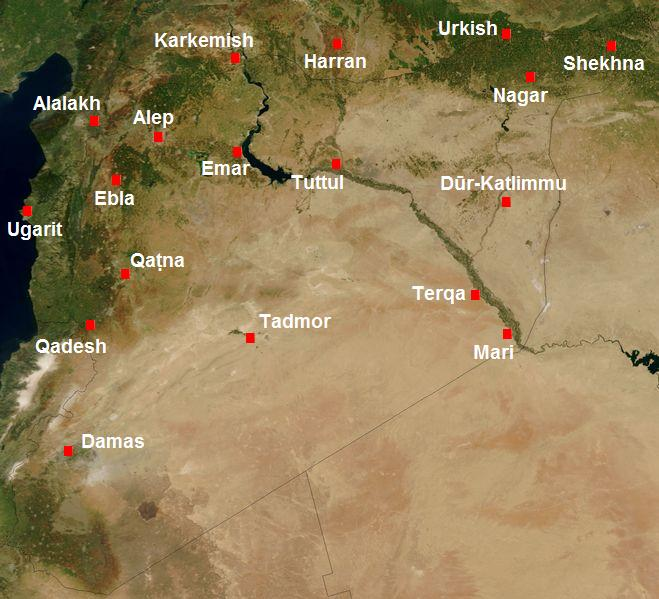
Syrian cities of the 2nd millennium B.C.E. (from left, clockwise): Ugarit, Ebla, Aleppo (Alep), Haran (Harran) and Mari.

== Book of Division (Jubilees) ==
According to the Book of Jubilees (9:5,6), the portion of the earth to be inherited by the descendants of Aram included all of the land between the Tigris and Euphrates rivers "to the north of the Chaldees to the border of the mountains of Asshur and the land of 'Arara."

"The mountains of Asshur in the north, and all the land of Elam, Asshur, and Babel, and Susan and Ma'edai" (Persia, Assyria, Babylonia, and Media, i.e. the Medes the sons of Madai) were apportioned to sons of Shem (Jubilees 8:21) and, consistent with the statement of the Book of Jubilees on Aram, the Aramaeans have historically been predominant in the north here, specifically central Syria, where Aramaic was the lingua franca, or common language, before the advent of Christianity.

== Antiquity of historical references to people of Aram ==
The toponym A-ra-mu appears in an inscription at Ebla listing geographical names, and the term Armi, which is the Eblaite term for nearby Aleppo, occurs frequently in the Ebla tablets (ca. 2300 BC). The inscriptions of Naram-Sin of Akkad, in the Akkadian language, closely associated Arman (i.e. Aleppo) with Ebla. One of the annals of Naram-Sin (22nd century) mentions that he captured "Dubul, the ensi of A-ra-me" (Arame is seemingly a genitive form), in the course of a campaign against Simurrum in the northern mountains.

Other early references to a place or people of "Aram" have appeared in the archives at Mari (c. 1900 BC) and at Ugarit (c. 1300 BC).

Tiglath-Pileser I (c. 1100 BC), in impressions of his later annals, referred to the Arameans: "I have crossed the Euphrates 28 times, twice in one year, in pursuit of the Aramaean Aḫlamū" (^{kur}Aḫ-la-me-e ^{kur}Ar-ma-a-ia^{meš}).

There may also have been a city named Arman east of the Tigris river.

The Semitic storm-god, Hadad, was patron deity of both Aram and Ugarit. The King of Aram (Syria) was called Ben-Hadad (English: son of Hadad; Aramaic: Bar-Hadad).

== In Islam ==
Islamic prophet Hud, a Prophet of ancient Arabia, is believed by Muslim scholars to have been a descendant of Aram. Hud is said to have preached in ʿĀd, in Arabia, according to the Quran. The town's eponymous ancestor, Ad, is considered to have been the son of Uz, one of Aram's sons.

The chapter of the Quran named Hud, Chapter 11, mentions the people of ʿĀd, and in verse 44, the ship of Noah is described as coming to rest on Mount Judi after "waves like mountains brought punishment upon wrongdoing people."

The Islamic prophet Saleh is also told to be a descendant of Aram.
