= Robert Bertram Serjeant =

British academic (1915–1993)

Robert Bertram Serjeant, FBA (23 March 1915 – 29 April 1993) was a British scholar, traveller, and one of the leading Arabists of his generation.

== Background and career ==
He was born and raised in Edinburgh and studied at the University of Edinburgh under the Quranic scholar Richard Bell. He received his MA in 1935, and moved on to Trinity College, Cambridge, completing his PhD dissertation on Islamic textiles under the supervision of Professor Charles Ambrose Storey. He won a scholarship to work at SOAS University of London with Arthur Stanley Tritton. In 1940, he was working in Aden Colony, but with the Second World War in progress, he was commissioned into the Aden Government Guards, spending his time in the canton of Subayhi.

He returned to the United Kingdom in 1941, where he edited the "Arabic Listener" at the BBC. When the war ended, he restarted his academic career at SOAS, and in 1947 went to research the language and society of the Hadhramaut in South Arabia. He published a study called Prose and Poetry from Hadhramawt in 1951. In 1955, he became the chair of Modern Arabic at SOAS. In 1964, his friend Professor AJ Arberry prompted him to return to Cambridge where he was appointed Lecturer in Islamic History. He was also director of the Middle East Centre at Pembroke College, Cambridge, remaining in this post until his retirement in 1981. Following Arberry's death in 1969, he was appointed Sir Thomas Adams's Professor of Arabic. After his retirement, he returned to his native Scotland where he continued his academic research.

Two of his notable works are The Portuguese off the South Arabian Coast, published by the Clarendon Press in 1963, and Sanaa: an Arabian Islamic city (1983) which he wrote and co-edited with Professor Ronald Lewcock. The latter is regarded as the definitive work on the Yemeni capital city of Sanaa. He also published South Arabian Hunt in 1976 and contributed to The Cambridge History of Arabic Literature in 1983.

== Personal life; death ==
Bob Serjeant married Marion Robertson, a doctor, in 1941 and they went on to have two children. They were married until his death in April 1993, when he died in the garden of his cottage in Denhead, St Andrews.

== Estate ==
In 1995, his widow donated his library of nearly 5,000 volumes on Islam and the Yemen, as well as his unpublished manuscripts to the University of Edinburgh.
