= Uz, son of Aram =

Minor Biblical figure and ascribed ancestor to various communities

Uz (Hebrew: עוּץ ‘Ūṣ) is one of the sons of Aram, son of Shem, according to the table of nations of Genesis 10 in the Hebrew Bible. This makes him a great-grandson of Noah.

He may have given his name to an area of the Middle East, later inhabited by the Old Testament character Job. Flavius Josephus states the tradition that he founded the cities of Trachonitis and Damascus.

According to Muslim scholar Ibn Kathir, (here called "Aus") he was the father of ‘Ad, the ancestor of the people of ʿĀd.

Australian Chinese revolutionary Tse Tsan-Tai seems to identify his descendants with the indigenous peoples of the Americas.
