= Nizar =

Nizar or Nazar or Nezar or Nezzar (Arabic: نزار, romanized: nizār) may refer to:

== Ancient and medieval people ==
- Nizar ibn Ma'ad, ancestor of Muhammad and most of the Adnanite tribes
- Abu Mansur Nizar al-Aziz Billah (955–996), fifth Caliph of the Fatimid Caliphate
- Nizar ibn al-Mustansir (1045–1095) Fatimid prince and claimant caliph in 1095

== Modern people ==
=== Surname ===
- Jamo Nezzar (born 1966), Algerian bodybuilder
- Khaled Nezzar (1937–2023), Algerian general
- Lotfi Nezzar, Algerian businessman
- Salman Nizar (born 1997), Indian cricketer
- Yazin Nizar (born 1990), Indian playback singer
- Ali Nizar, Maldivian politician

=== Given name ===
- Nizar Al-Adsani, Kuwaiti business man
- Nazar Al Baharna (born 1950), Bahraini politician
- Nezar AlSayyad (born 1956), Egyptian-American architect
- Nizar Assaad (born 1948), Syrian-born Canadian construction engineer
- Nizar Baraka (born 1964), Moroccan politician
- Nizar Chaari (born 1977), Tunisian radio and television presenter and producer
- Nizar Dramsy, Malagasy politician
- Nizar Hamdoon (1944–2003), Iraqi politician and diplomat
- Nizar Hamid (born 1988), Sudanese footballer
- Nezar Hindawi (born 1954), Jordanian convicted of attempting to place a bomb on a plane
- Mohammad Nizar Jamaluddin (born 1957), Menteri Besar (MB) of the Malaysian state of Perak
- Nizar Khalfan (born 1988), Tanzanian footballer
- Nizar Knioua (born 1983), Tunisian basketball player
- Nizar Madani (born 1941), Saudi politician
- Nizar Mahrous (born 1963), Syrian football player
- Nizar Ben Nasra (born 1987), Tunisian-Austrian football forward
- Nizar Nayyouf (born 1962), Syrian journalist
- Nizar Niyas (born 1990), Indian first-class cricket player
- Nizar Qabbani (1923–1998), Syrian diplomat, poet and publisher
- Nizar Rayan (1959–2009), Palestinian Hamas leader
- Nizar Sassi (born 1979), Frenchman detained in Guantanamo
- Yousif Nizar Saleh (born 1994), Kuwaiti squash player
- Nizar Samlal (born 1979), Moroccan canoeman
- Nizar Shafi (born 1989), Indian cinematographer
- Nizar Trabelsi (born 1970), Tunisian football player
- Nizar Wattad, Palestinian/American rapper
- Mohd Nizar Zakaria (born 1969), Malaysian politician
- Nizar Zakka, Lebanese information technology expert

== Places ==
- Gamishli Nazar, village in Iran
- Nizar, Iran, a village in Kohgiluyeh and Boyer-Ahmad Province, Iran
- Nezar, Iran, a village in Kurdistan Province, Iran
- Nijhar, sometimes written as Nizar, tehsil in Tapi district in Gujarat, India
