= Battle of Redon =

1799 battle

- Part of the Chouannerie
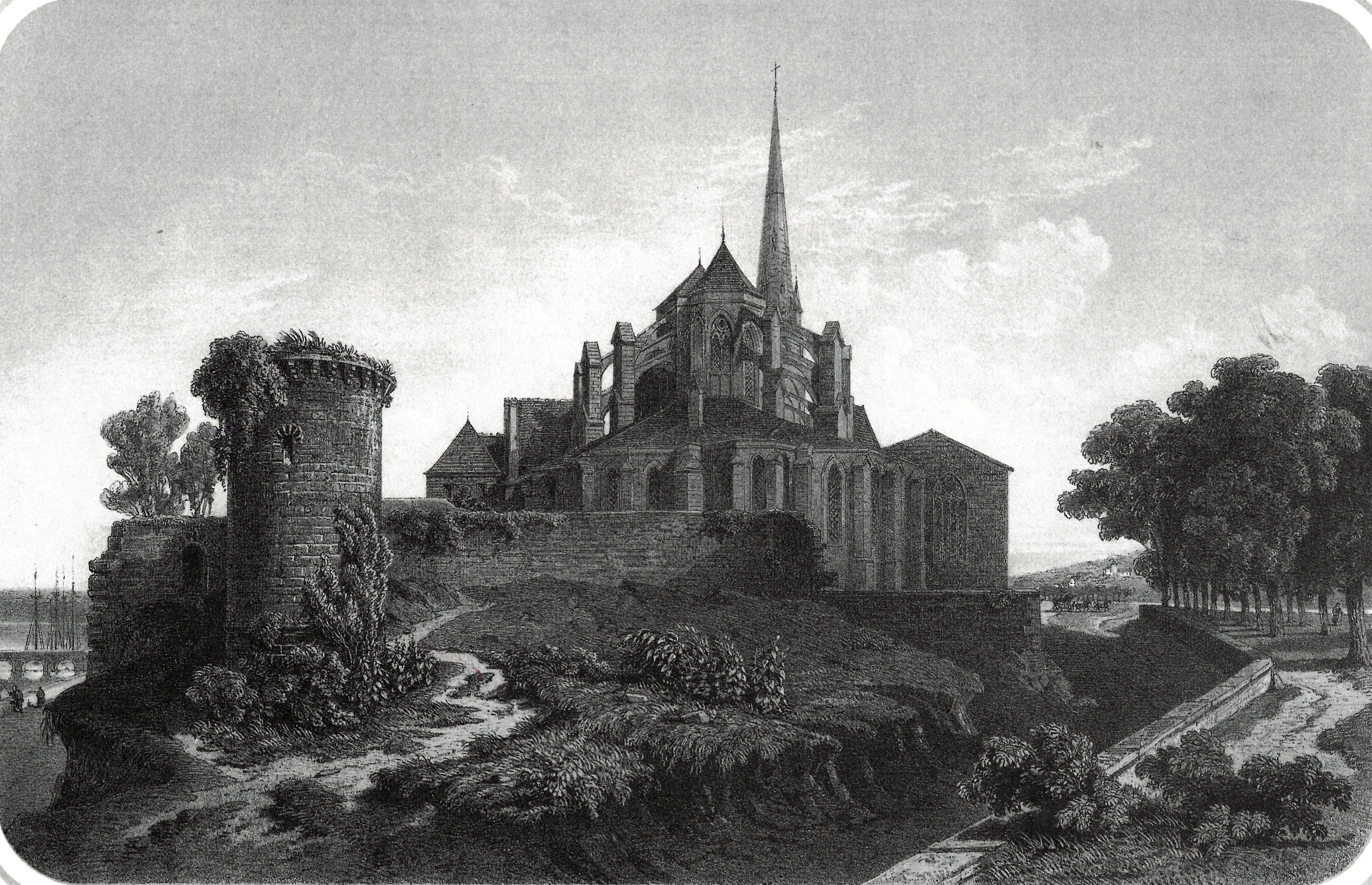
- Abside de l'église Saint-Sauveur à Redon, engraving by Thomas Drake, 1860
| Date | November 10, 1799 |
| Location | Redon, France 47°39′08″N 2°05′01″W |
| Result | Chouan victory |

Belligerents
| (France) French Republic | Chouans |

Commanders and leaders
| Capitaine Gely | Louis de Sol de Grisolles |

Strength
| 40 to 60 individuals 4 cannons 3 pierriers | 900 to 1,200 individuals 2 cannons |

Casualties and losses
| 5 dead 5 wounded 30 to 50 prisoners (released) | 1 to 4 dead 4 to 12 wounded |
- Location within France

The Battle of Redon occurred on November 10, 1799, during the Chouannerie. The battle concluded with the triumph of the Chouans, who proceeded to occupy the town of Redon.

== Prelude ==
In October 1799, the Chouans of the Redon and Muzillac legion, attached to the Catholic and Royal Army of Morbihan and commanded by Louis de Sol de Grisolles, initiated a series of attacks on localities held by Republican forces. The campaign commenced with the capture of La Roche-Bernard on October 26. This was followed by the occupation of Nozay on the 27th, Bain on the 29th, and a return to La Roche-Bernard on November 2. Subsequently, they entered Muzillac without resistance on the 4th and Questembert on the 5th. De Sol abandoned his plans to attack Rochefort-en-Terre, which he deemed to be too well-defended, and instead decided to march on Redon.

On November 7, Captain Gely, the commanding officer in Redon, was informed that a considerable quantity of military supplies had been unloaded following a shipwreck and subsequently stored in Redon's warehouses. Gely dispatched a missive to General Roulland in Rennes to apprise him of the situation, but the letter was intercepted by the Chouans. Despite implementing security measures, including the concealment of the letter within the courier's cravat and the use of a decoy, the message was nevertheless discovered. Consequently, the Chouans were made aware of a considerable quantity of weapons and munitions in Redon.

On November 9, reports were filed concerning the presence of Chouans in Saint-Martin-sur-Oust, Fougerêts, and Glénac, situated to the northwest of the town.

== Forces involved ==
At that time, the garrison at Redon consisted of 40 to 60 individuals, under the command of Captain Gely.

In the aftermath of the assaults on neighboring communities, Redon was placed under siege. All military provisions were stored within the church, and patrols were established. The town was encircled by medieval fortifications, yet these were in a state of disrepair and could not offer robust protection. In response, the Republicans constructed fortifications at Saint-Sauveur Abbey, the town hall, and in front of the tower. Four cannons and three small mortars were mounted at these locations.

Captain Gely estimated the royalist army under Louis de Sol de Grisolles to consist of 900 individuals, or 1,200 well-armed troops, including 30 to 40 deserters from the Republican army and 160 elite soldiers. In his report to the Minister of War, General Taponier augmented this figure to 2,000 or 3,000 troops. (Note: It is presumed that a letter from the commander of Redon to the general commanding the subdivision of Ille-et-Vilaine, reporting the scarcity and weakness of the garrison in this town and the existence of a storehouse containing supplies for the Republic, prompted the Chouans to resolve to seize it. The unfortunate courier who was conveying this missive was killed. The battle lasted seven hours. It was only when De Sol, the leader of the band of brigands, threatened the garrison and the townspeople that he would set the town alight if they did not surrender. Facing imminent destruction, the valiant Republicans requested permission to surrender. Their plea was granted, and 40 men, accompanied by drums beating and fuses lit, were permitted to withdraw with the remaining 2,000 Chouans and the townspeople. — Report by General Alexandre Camille Taponier to the Minister of War.)

== Battle ==
The assault commenced on November 10 at approximately 6 or 7 a.m. The Chouans infiltrated Redon from the north and west, resulting in a barrage of gunfire near the prison post.

The Republican soldiers were taken by surprise by the rapid attack and consequently abandoned their posts, seeking refuge in the Saint-Sauveur Abbey. Awakened by the gunfire, some of the townspeople also attempted to reach the abbey but were prevented from doing so by the Chouans, who ordered them to return home.

However, the Chouans encountered a significant obstacle in their advance toward the abbey, as they did not have enough artillery. Two 4-pounder guns were unloaded from a ship docked in the port, but their caliber was insufficient to breach the buildings.

At approximately one o'clock in the afternoon, the fighting ceased, and at two o'clock, the Chouans transmitted a demand to the besieged, requesting the surrender of their weapons in exchange for the assurance of their safe departure with their belongings. Captain Gely convened his war council in the church, which rejected the proposal.

De Sol then gathered bundles of wood, straw, and tar, issuing threats to set fire to the houses near the monastery. In response to these threats, the Republicans ultimately surrendered after two additional hours of resistance. The defenders were permitted to depart freely with their arms and belongings, on the condition that they would refrain from further armed conflict with the royalists. (Note: The enemy forces arrived at Redon at 06:00 hours on the previous day. The enemy initiated an assault on both ends of the town. The enemy force comprised approximately 900 individuals. The garrison retreated to its fortifications and successfully repelled the attack until one in the afternoon. At approximately two o'clock, the insurgents presented a proposal for capitulation, offering the guarantee of safe evacuation without weapons but with the retention of personal belongings. I convened the council in the besieged temple. Given the imminent threat of starvation and the lack of viable defensive options, it was agreed that the best course of action would be to propose an evacuation with arms and baggage. This proposal was initially rejected for two hours, with the threat of setting the town on fire and breaking through in the ensuing chaos. Ultimately, the royalist leader granted the request, on the condition that the troops would no longer serve against them. The opposition forces took control of the surrounding houses, providing their occupants with the same means of protection from gunfire that we had. The former Benedictine convent was of considerable size. It was evident that a relatively small force could not provide comprehensive protection for the entire complex of buildings. Following two hours of sustained gunfire, the enemy sent two emissaries to negotiate a surrender. They entered through the rear and informed me verbally that we were being summoned by the rebel leader to surrender, or else face the consequences of being forced by fire and the destruction of the buildings that sheltered us. In response, we verbally asserted our refusal to capitulate and our ability to defend ourselves. At that juncture, we hoisted the tricolor flag atop the fortifications, accompanied by the sounding of the Marseillaise. We continued to engage in combat for another four hours. It was observed that the adversaries were accumulating bundles of wood and straw to carry out their arson threats. Once these preparations were completed, the enemy issued a written ultimatum, demanding our surrender. They guaranteed we would be permitted to depart with our lives and belongings intact. It was made clear that two four-pounder cannons, procured from a naval vessel, were prepared for an assault on our fortifications. Furthermore, it was stated that no additional terms would be forthcoming after this declaration. In a written response, it was conveyed that the only terms under which the garrison would surrender were those that ensured the safety of the town inhabitants, including the departure of the troops with arms and baggage, and the safeguarding of their lives and property. My response was conveyed by Citizen Chevalier, commissioner of the Executive Directory, and my quartermaster, but it was rejected by the enemy, who insisted on receiving our weapons. After an hour of sustained gunfire, a final demand was made under the original conditions. I reiterated my previous offer, which was ultimately accepted. The gunfire ceased on both sides. I held a brief conference with the leader, during which I requested medical attention for two men who were severely wounded. I obtained a cart for two others who sustained minor injuries, and we were compelled to depart by road for Nantes at approximately three in the afternoon. — Excerpts from Captain Gely’s reports.)

== Casualties ==
The Republican forces sustained a total of five fatalities, including three combat deaths, and five injuries, including three military personnel and two civilian volunteers.

François Cadic and Émile Sageret indicate that the Chouan forces sustained one fatality and four injuries, including Martin de la Plazette, also known as Dufresne, a member of De Sol's staff. Monique Souben asserts that the royalist casualties numbered four killed and approximately twelve wounded.

== Consequences ==
Following the capture of Redon, the Chouans proceeded to seize the arsenal and the storehouse located within Saint-Sauveur Abbey and the adjacent church. This storehouse contained considerable military supplies, including 25,000 pounds of gunpowder, 1,200 pairs of shoes, 300 greatcoats, 200 pairs of boots, and numerous saddles. The Chouans disarmed two chasse-marée (coastal vessels) and destroyed the archives stored in the abbey house and three tax offices. Additionally, numerous local peasants joined De Sol de Grisolles' troops. The capitulation was honored, and the Republican prisoners were released. They departed the town at approximately 3 p.m. and proceeded to Bain-de-Bretagne.

== See also ==
- Battle of Redon (1815)

== Bibliography ==
- Cadic, François (2003). Histoire populaire de la chouannerie [Popular history of the Chouannerie]. Les Œuvres de François Cadic (in French). Vol. II. Terre de brume & Presses Universitaires de Rennes. ISBN 978-2843622076.
- Chassin, Charles-Louis (1899). Les pacifications de l'Ouest 1794-1801-1815 : Du dix-huit fructidor au Concordat et à l'invasion [The pacifications of the West 1794-1801-1815: From the Eighteenth of Fuctidor to the Concordat and the Invasion] (in French). Vol. III. Paris: Paul Dupont.
- Sageret, Émile (1911). Le Morbihan et la Chouannerie morbihannaise sous le Consulat : Le Morbihan au début de l'an VIII — La fin de la Période révolutionnaire [Morbihan and the Morbihan Chouannerie under the Consulate: Morbihan at the beginning of An VIII - The end of the Revolutionary Period] (in French). Vol. I. Librairie Alphonse Picard & fils. Éditeur de la Société d'Histoire Contemporaine.
- Souben, Monique (1989). La Chouannerie dans le district de Redon 1794-1799 [The Chouannerie in the Redon district 1794-1799] (in French). Rue des Scribes édition.
