= Nazir =

Nazir or Nazeer may refer to:

- Nazir (title)
- Nazir (name)
- Nazir (aka Abu Umer), Pakistani Lashkar-e-Taiba militant, one of the perpetrators of the 2008 Mumbai attacks
- Nazirite, in the Hebrew Bible, one who took the ascetic vow described in Numbers 6:1-21
- Nazir (Talmud), a tractate of the Talmud dealing with Nazirites
- Nazeer (horse), an Arabian stallion of "straight Egyptian" bloodlines

== See also ==
- Naseer (disambiguation)
- Nasir (name)
- Nazar (disambiguation)
- Naseer, a fictional character played by Abir Chatterjee in the Indian films Bishorjan (2017) and Bijoya (2019)
