= AdduLIVE =

Maldivian news outlet

- Always First
- Logo used since 2019
- Founded: 1 January 2013; 12 years ago
- Language: Dhivehi
- City: Addu City
- Country: Maldives

AdduLIVE is a regional news outlet based in Addu City, Maldives. It is one of the most popular regional news outlets in the country.

== History ==
AdduLIVE was founded on 1 January 2013. Its website was officially launched at the Equatorial Convention Centre by the Mayor of Addu City Abdulla Sodiq.

On 22 October 2015, AdduLIVE's website was hacked following repeated threatening calls made from anonymous callers to AdduLIVE journalists. The International Federation of Journalists criticized the hacking and called on the Maldivian government to condemn the attack and protect the security and safety of journalists. It was later back in the following week. The outlet claims that it was hacked after it published about a beginning of a presidential impeachment.

On 22 April 2016, the Communications Authority of Maldives under the order of the Ministry of Home Affairs blocked AdduLIVE's website. Home Minister Umar Naseer said that it was blocked due to the site being unregistered. However, AdduLIVE claims that it was blocked after it published a report about how then-First Lady Fathimath Ibrahim was linked to corruption. It was later unblocked on 4 July 2016.

On 15 October 2017, AdduLIVE launched their own mobile app.
