= Nazar =

Nazar may refer to:

- Nazar (amulet), an amulet of stone or glass which is believed to protect against evil eye
- Nazar (given name), a masculine given name

== Film and television ==
- Nazar the Brave, a 1940 Soviet comedy film directed by Amasi Martirosyan
- Nazar (1991 film), a Bollywood film directed by Mani Kaul
- Nazar (2005 film), a Bollywood film starring Meera and Ashmit Patel
- Nazar (TV series) a 2018 Indian television series

== Music ==
- Nazar (band), a Turkish band that entered the Eurovision Song Contest 1978
- Nazar (album), a 2015 album released by Joe Chawki and Hodge Gjonbalaj

== Other uses ==
- Nazar, a subterranean fictional planet in Ludvig Holberg's 1741 novel Niels Klim's Underground Travels
- Nazar, Navarre, a municipality in the province of Navarre, Spain

== See also ==
- Nazir (disambiguation)
- Nizar (disambiguation)
