= Charles-Louis Chassin =

French historian (1831–1901)

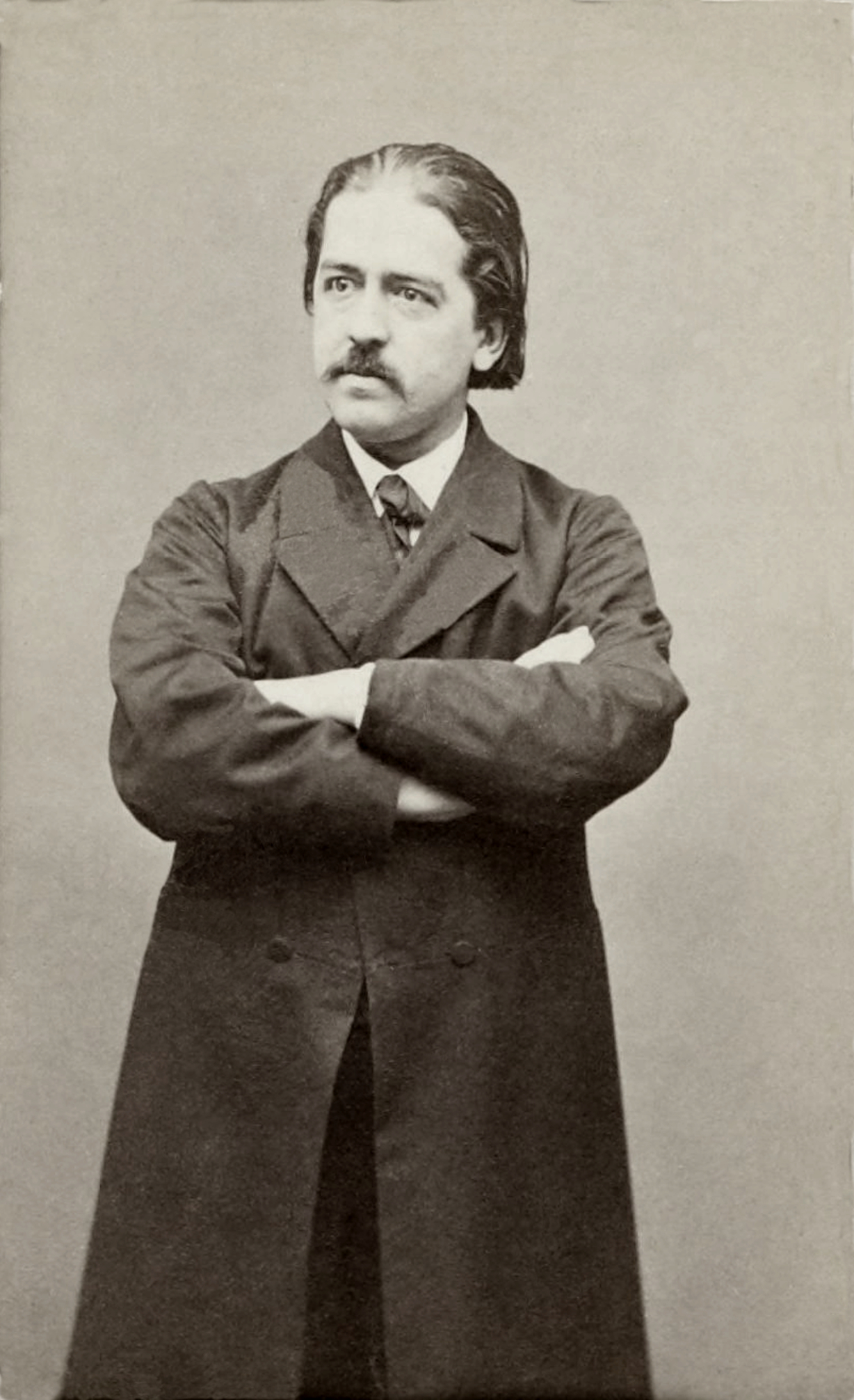
Charles-Louis Chassin

Charles-Louis Chassin (1831–1901) was a French historian who edited a documentary collection on the War in the Vendée.

Chassin viewed the French Revolution favourably, declaring that the Revolution's centenary demonstrated "the legitimacy of the demands of our fathers".

Upon hearing the news of Abraham Lincoln's assassination, Chassin wrote a letter to the Phare de la Loire raising the idea of a memorial medal in Lincoln's honour, which would be sent to Mary Todd Lincoln. This was to be funded by a subscription of ten centimes and it eventually amassed 40,000 signatures (including those of Victor Hugo, Jules Michelet and Louis Blanc).

== Works ==
- Les Elections et les cahiers de Paris en 1789: Documents recueillis, mis en order at annotés (Paris, 1888–89), 4 volumes.
- La Préparation de la guerre de Vendée (Paris, 1892), 3 volumes.
- Les Pacifications de l'Ouest, 1794-1801 (Paris, 1896–99), 3 volumes.

== See also ==
- Battle of Redon (1815)
