= Battle of Redon (1815) =

Part of the Napoleonic Wars

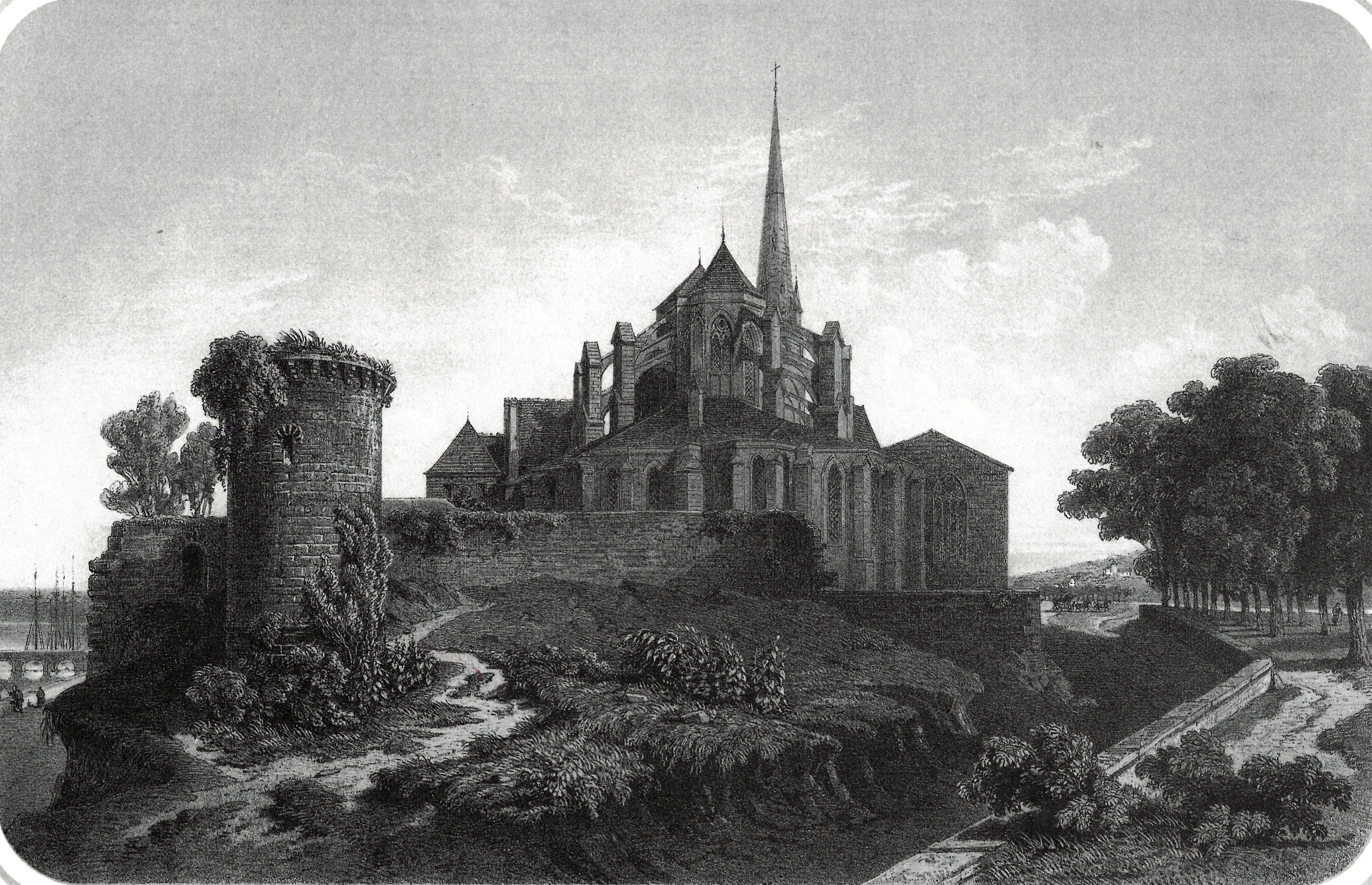
- Abside de l'église Saint-Sauveur à Redon, engraving by Thomas Drake, circa 1850.
Date	June 4, 1815
Location	Redon, Brittany 47°39′08″N 2°05′01″W
Result	Chouan retreat

Belligerents
French Empire	Chouan

Commanders and leaders
Cagnazzoli	Louis de Sol de Grisolles; Marc-Antoine de La Boëssière de Lennuic; Joseph de Cadoudal; Yves Le Thieis; Louis Joseph de Margadel; Julien Guillemot; Claude-René Guezno de Penanster; Louis-Jacques de Sécillon; Jean Rohu; Guillaume Gamber

Units involved
120 individuals	5,000 individuals

Casualties and losses
4 dead 6 injured	7 to 12 dead 30 to 50 injured
- Location within France

The Battle of Redon, fought on June 4, 1815, was a significant clash during the Chouannerie of 1815, where the royalist Chouan forces led by Louis de Sol de Grisolles attacked the town of Redon. Despite their numerical advantage of 4,000–5,000 troops against a small Imperial garrison of 120 men, the Chouans could not capture the town due to their lack of artillery and withdrew after intense fighting.

== Events ==
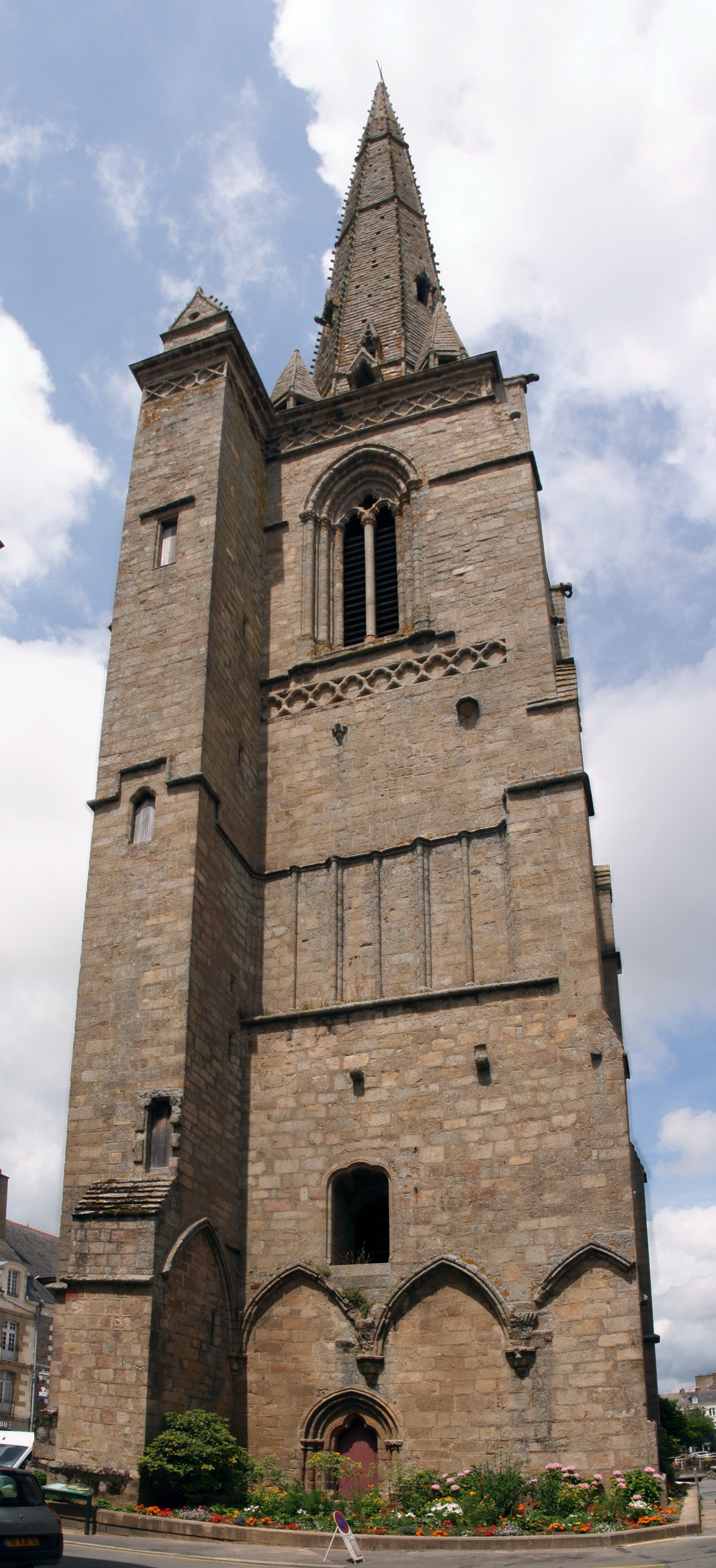
View of the bell-tower of Redon's Abbatiale Saint-Sauveur (2009), where imperial soldiers dug in during the battle.

On June 4, 1815, the Chouan army of Louis de Sol de Grisolles, comprising a force of between 4,000 and 5,000 men, launched an assault on the town of Redon, situated at the southwestern extremity of the Ille-et-Vilaine department. The Imperial forces comprised only 120 men, including 100 soldiers from the 11th Light Infantry Regiment and approximately twenty volunteers. These were under the command of Battalion chief Cagnazzoli and Sub-Prefect Baymé, a former squadron leader.

The Imperial forces established a defensive position at advanced posts along the avenues leading into the town. However, the Chouans, possessing a significantly larger number of troops, could dislodge them from the suburb's main street on the road to Rennes, situated to the north of the town, as well as from the Codilo district to the west. In this latter instance, the gendarmes, concealed within the vineyards, were circumvented by a detachment of insurgents who had gained access to the area through Parc Anger.

The Imperial forces then withdrew to the town hall, which was barricaded, while approximately twenty of their number sought refuge in the bell tower of the Saint-Sauveur Abbey. Meanwhile, the inhabitants of Redon allied with the royalists.

However, the Chouans were lacking in artillery and could not overcome the last Imperial strongholds. Furthermore, Sol de Grisolles refused to set fire to the besieged buildings, fearing the fire might spread to the town. Ultimately, the Chouans were forced to evacuate Redon and withdraw to Peillac.

== Casualties ==
In his summary of the 1815 campaign, royalist officer Marc-Antoine de La Boëssière de Lennuic reports that 17 soldiers and gendarmes were killed during the fighting. Charles-Louis Chassin, in his account, states losses of three dead and six wounded. In 2015, historian Aurélien Lignereux gave a total of four dead.

In his memoirs, (Note: On June 4, the Royal Army entered the town of Redon; but lacking artillery, they were unable to capture an old crenelated tower there, in which the garrison had safely taken refuge. The garrison defended itself courageously and inflicted considerable losses on the Chouans. The brave young Langourla, the last offspring of an old noble family, was killed as he charged toward this tower. Six others perished with him, and about thirty were wounded, among whom were Pierre Le Cars, known as Pelo, from Caden, one of the oldest and bravest officers in the Royal Army; the brave Mathurin Charrier, former grenadier captain of the Bignan Battalion; your father, who had his thigh pierced by a bullet; and Mr. Hervieu, a young man from Vannes, well-known for his steadfastness and noble character. — Memoirs of Julien Guillemot) Chouan officer Julien Guillemot states that the number of casualties on their side was seven killed and approximately thirty wounded. According to La Boëssière de Lennuic, the royalist casualties included six or seven fatalities and approximately thirty individuals wounded, including officers Courson, Breteché, Pioger, Hervieux, and Le Car. Historian Aurélien Lignereux estimates that between seven and twelve individuals were killed and approximately fifty were wounded. Langourla, a young nobleman from Josselin, was among the deceased.

== Bibliography ==
- Chassin, Charles-Louis (1899). Les pacifications de l'Ouest, 1794-1801-1815 [The pacifications of the West, 1794-1801-1815] (in French). Vol. III. Paris: Plon.
- Guillemot, Julien (1859). Lettres à mes neveux sur la Chouannerie [Letters to my nephews on the Chouannerie] (in French). Imprimerie Félix Masseaux. Archived from the original on June 15, 2024.
- La Borderie, Arthur (1869). Revue de Bretagne et de Vendée [Review of Brittany and Vendé] (in French). Vol. V – Troisième série (Tome XXV de la collection). Nantes: Bureau de rédaction et d'abonnement. Archived from the original on May 24, 2021.
- Lignereux, Aurélien (2015). Chouans et Vendéens contre l'Empire, 1815. L'autre Guerre des Cent-Jours [Chouans and Vendéens against the Empire, 1815. The other Hundred Days' War] (in French). Paris: Éditions Vendémiaire. ISBN 978-2363581877.
