= 2026 Hithadhoo North parliamentary by-election =

Parliamentary by-election in Hithadhoo

- 6 June 2026
- Turnout: 66.25%
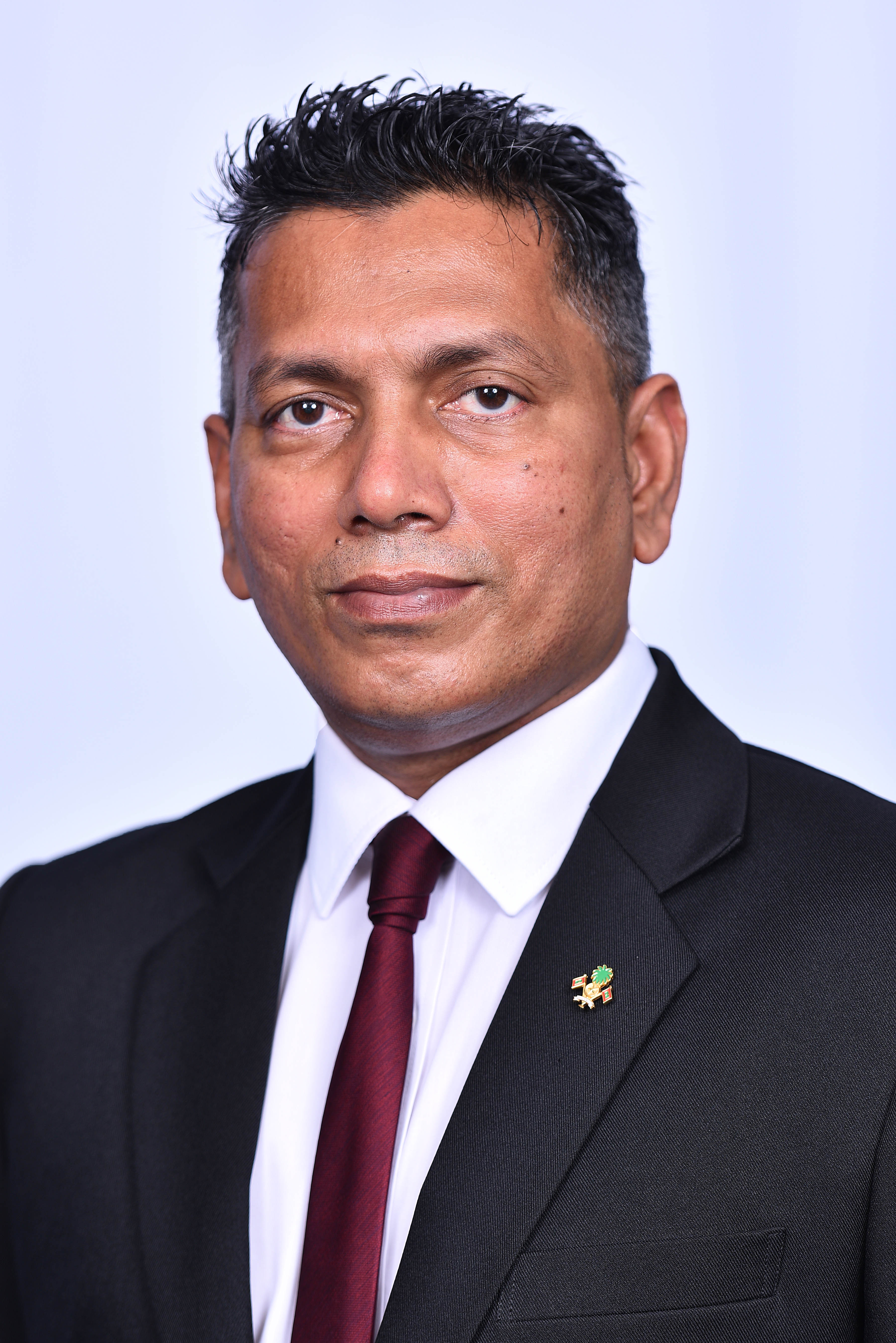
Candidate	Ahmed Saeed	Abdulla Sodiq
Party	PNC	MDP
Popular vote	1313	1375
Percentage	48.85%	51.15%
MP before election
Mohamed Sinan
PNC
Elected MP
Abdulla Sodiq
MDP

The Hithadhoo North by-election is a parliamentary by-election held on 6 June 2026 in the Hithadhoo North (Hithadhoo Uthuru) constituency, located in Hithadhoo, Addu City. The constituency forms part of the People's Majlis, the unicameral legislature of the Maldives. The by-election was triggered following a ruling by the Supreme Court of the Maldives which declared that incumbent MP Mohamed Sinan lost his seat following decreed debt.

== Background ==
In the 2024 parliamentary election, Mohamed Sinan of the People's National Congress (PNC) defeating incumbent Mohamed Aslam of the Maldivian Democratic Party (MDP). In July 2024, the Maldives Islamic Bank (MIB) sued Sinan and his coapplicants Ahmed Waheed and Mohamed Saleem for failing to repay an MVR 3.8 million loan. The MIB later won the case in October and the Hithadhoo Magistrate Court ordered Sinan, Waheed, and Saleem to settle MVR 2.5 million in outstanding loan payments and fines in six months.

In February 2025, Ghalib Saleem, a private citizen, filed a petition at the Supreme Court of the Maldives to declare Sinan's seat vacant under the Article 73(c) of the Constitution, which states that "A person shall be disqualified from election as, a member of the People’s Majlis, or a member of the People’s Majlis immediately becomes disqualified, if he has a decreed debt which is not being paid as provided in the judgement".

After the case was filed in the Supreme Court, Muhuthaz Muhusin paid off Sinan's debts for him. However, the Financial Intelligence Unit of the Maldives Monetary Authority opened an investigation as to the source of funds for that loan to be paid off. After the loan was paid, legal experts were divided whether or not Sinan would be able to lose his seat. The Supreme Court’s registrar later accepted the case.

In April 2026, the Supreme Court ruled that Sinan lost his seat in the Majlis. The verdict was unanimously supported by all five justices presiding over it. The Elections Commission (ECM) announced that the by-election for North Hithadhoo and announced in May, that there are 4121 eligible voters for the by-election.

On 6 June 2026, the polls opened from 08:00 am and closed on 05:00 pm (GMT+5), with seven ballot boxes installed for the vote. Five boxes were at Hithadhoo School in Addu City and two at Dharumavantha School in Malé.

=== Eligibility ===
The ECM has also shared the candidate eligibility rules. In addition to the basic requirements, certain individuals in specific situations will not be allowed to take part in the People's Majlis election. These include:

- Above 18 or older
- Maldivian citizen
- Suuni Muslim
- Not a person with a proven decreed debt who is not making payments as per the court judgment.
- Not a person convicted of a criminal offense and currently serving a sentence of more than 12 months. (If convicted of a criminal offense and sentenced to a term longer than 12 months, three years must have passed since the completion of the sentence or the pardon of the penalty.

== Candidates ==
Former Addu CIty mayor Abdulla Sodiq of the Maldivian Democratic Party (MDP) announced his interest to run and won the MDP ticket unopposed. Sinan also announced his intention to run in the by-election. He and Ahmed Saeed, a Hithadhoo Moolekede Councillor contested in the People's National Congress (PNC) primary to secure the party's ticket. Sinan later won the PNC ticket but dropped out three days later stating he wanted to give an opportunity to the new candidate. The PNC gave its ticket to Saeed. This made Sodiq and Saeed the only contenders in the by-election.

== Results ==
Results of the Hithadhoo North by-election
Candidate	Party	Votes	%
Ahmed Saeed	People's National Congress	1,313	48.85
Abdulla Sodiq	Maldivian Democratic Party	1,375	51.15
Total		2,688	100.00
Valid votes		2,688	98.46
Invalid/blank votes		42	1.54
Total votes		2,730	100.00
Registered voters/turnout		4,121	66.25
Source: Elections Commission

Sodiq was announced as the winner of the by-election, defeating Saeed. He won with 1375 votes while Saeed received 1313 votes.

== Aftermath ==
On 15 June, Sodiq took his oath of office as a member of the People's Majlis for Hithadhoo North.
