= Nazir (name) =

Nazir or Nazeer is both a masculine given name and a surname of Arabic origin. Notable people with the name include:

== Given name ==
- Nazeer Abbasi (1953–1980), Sindhi political activist
- Nazeer Akbarabadi (1735–1830), 18th-century Urdu poet
- Nazeer Allie (born 1985), South African footballer
- Nazeer Naji (1942/43–2020), Pakistani journalist
- Nazir Ahmed (disambiguation), multiple people
- Nazir Afzal (born 1962), British solicitor
- Nazir Dekhaiya (1921–1988), Gujarati poet from India
- Nazir Jairazbhoy (1927–2009), professor of music at UCLA
- Nazir Sabir, Pakistani mountaineer
- Nazir Stackhouse (born 2002), American football player

== Surname ==
- Imran Nazir (born 1981), Pakistani cricketer
- Maulvi Nazir (1975–2013), Pakistani Taliban leader
- Prem Nazir (1926–1989), Malayali Indian film actor
- Shaied Nazir (born 1980), convicted of the racially motivated murder of Ross Parker
