= Jamo Nezzar =

Algerian bodybuilder

Jamo Nezzar (JamCore)
- Founder of JamCore Training
- Born: December 6, 1966
- Occupation: Personal Training Expert

Jamo Nezzar (born December 6, 1966, in Batna, Algeria) is a retired professional bodybuilder and personal training expert, and founder of JamCore Training, JC Elite Coaching Academy and Co-owner of MyFitTribe.com and Elite Trainer.

== Life and bodybuilding career ==
Jamo Nezzar was born in Batna, Algeria on December 6, 1966. At a young age, Jamo was always interested in health and sports, and eventually led to studying biology. After completing his degree in biology, Jamo entered the pre-med program at the Dergana University in Algeria, soon realizing that his passion was for bodybuilding and personal training.

In 1987, Jamo moved to London to seriously pursue bodybuilding, until 1994 he focused on training and competition. During his travels Jamo also worked with others as a fitness consultant.

In 2001, Jamo moved to Southern California to further his career as an International Federation of BodyBuilders professional and fitness specialist. During this time his personal training efforts and development of JamCore Training were solidified into a successful system. Jamo retired from competition in 2003 and focused on helping others lead fit, healthy lives.

== Company ==
After retiring from professional bodybuilding due to injury in 2003, Jamo founded JamCore Training, a company specializing in personal training. During this time, Jamo developed the JamCore Training system, a program that offered online fitness, health and nutrition information.

Jamo working with Incendia Media then took JamCore Training and created a great new Health & Fitness Social Network called MyFitTribe.com. The extended capabilities, great features, friendly community and MyFitTribe Team giving great Health & Fitness information in articles, videos, pictures, blogs with all the features of a social network.

In 2008, Jamo decided to specialize in a new niche: women’s training. After four years of focusing on this niche, Jamo was approached by the organizers of the Miss California and Miss USA beauty pageants to train their competitors. His expertise played a pivotal role in helping Nicole Johnson win Miss California USA 2010 and Alyssa Campanella before she went on to become Miss USA 2011.

In 2012, Jamo spent two years preparing IFBB Bikini competitors for their competitions while simultaneously developing the JCSWEAT20 workout—a home-based program designed for women to achieve optimal results. During this time, he also opened his first official gym, JamCore Gym, in Westlake Village.

== Competition history ==
1989 - England Over all Stars of Tom
1991 - South East Lightheavy British- 2nd
1994 - Heavyweight British Championship - 2nd
1995 - Heavyweight British Championship - 3rd
1996 - Over all Southeast British Championship 1st
1996 - Heavyweight British Championship - 2nd
1999 - Over all Heavyweight Northeast champion 1st
1999 - Heavyweight British Championship - 2nd
1999 - Amateur Grand Prix Champion (Pro Card)
1999 - IFBB English grand Prix (first Pro Show)- 10th
2000 - IFBB Ironman- 14th
2001 - IFBB Pro Toronto Canada Cup- 11th
2001 - Night of the Champion (42 competitors)- 18th
2002 - IFBB Pro Ironman- 12th
2002 - IFBB San Francisco Pro Show- 12th
2002 - IFBB Austrian Grand Prix-10th
