= Nizar Dramsy =

Malagasy politician

Nizar Dramsy is a Malagasy politician. A member of the National Assembly of Madagascar, he was elected as a member of the Tiako I Madagasikara party. He was elected in the 2002 Malagasy parliamentary elections and reelected in 2007. He represents the constituency of Port Bergé.

He is also the founder and director of Dramco SARL.
