= Abdulla Sodiq (politician) =

Maldivian politician

- އަބްދުﷲ ސާދިޤް
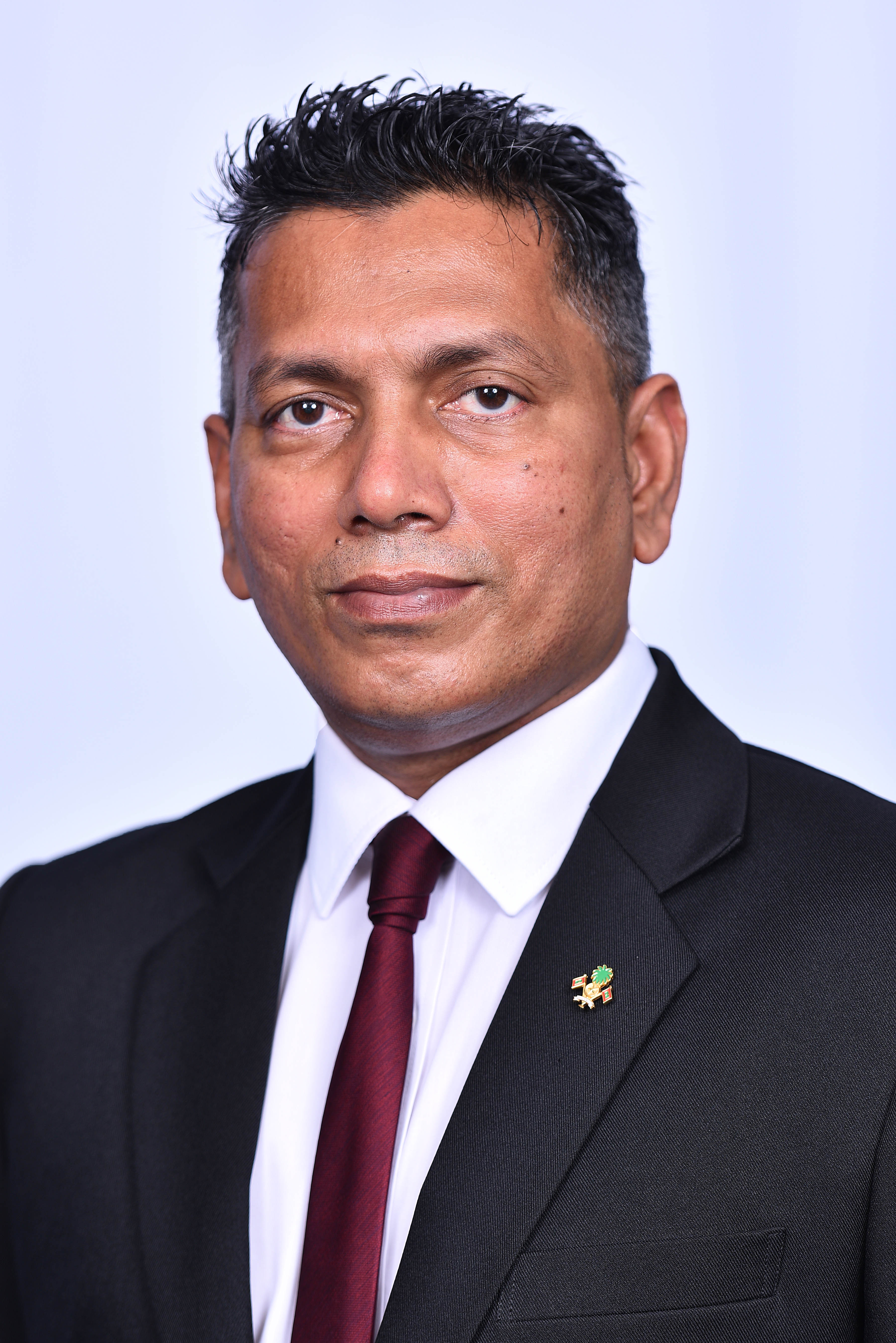
- Portrait, 2021

Member of the People's Majlis
- Incumbent
- Assumed office 15 June 2026
- President: Mohamed Muizzu
- Preceded by: Mohamed Sinan
- Constituency: Hithadhoo North

1st Mayor of Addu City
- In office 24 February 2011 – 17 May 2021
- President: Mohamed Nasheed; Mohamed Waheed Hassan; Abdulla Yameen; Ibrahim Mohamed Solih
- Succeeded by: Ali Nizar

Personal details
- Party: Maldivian Democratic Party
- Education: University of South Australia (BSc)

Abdulla Sodiq (Note: Sodiq's name has been spelled in various ways. The President's Office and the People's Majlis spell his last name as "Sodig", while news outlets most commonly spell it as "Sodiq". His last name had also been spelled as "Sodhiq". For the sake of consistency, this article spells his name as "Sodiq" since its used more commonly.) (Dhivehi: އަބްދުﷲ ސާދިޤް), popularly known as Sobé, is a Maldivian politician who served as the Member of the People's Majlis for Hithadhoo North constituency since 2026. A member of the Maldivian Democratic Party, he served as the first mayor of Addu City from 2011 to 2021.

== Early life ==
He did his higher education at the University of South Australia where he got his Bachelor of Science in Applied Chemistry & Chemical Technology. He also previously worked as a teacher.

== Career ==
=== Atoll councillor ===
Sodiq was soon appointed an atoll councillor of Addu City, Maldives following the presidential election of 2008. Since then, Sodiq has worked to create development opportunities for Addu Atoll. One of his most noteworthy accomplishments during his term in office was to lobby for legislation to grant city status to Addu City and create the legal framework for the management of municipal funds and development planning by a city council for Addu Atoll. The improved efficiency of operating local municipalities (atolls and islands) through this reformed process removed political and administrative obstacles.

=== Mayoralty ===
Sodiq assumed office as the first mayor of Addu City on 24 February 2011. President Mohamed Nasheed's decision to hold the South Asian Association for Regional Cooperation summit in Addu City facilitated investments in public infrastructure including the construction of Hithadhoo district's main road (Dhivehi: ބޮޑުމަގު), which spanned up to 4.5 km and the renovation of street-lights in Addu City. The government also completed the construction of the Equatorial Convention Center in Addu City exclusively to host the 17th SAARC summit in the Maldives. The Government's effort in instating Addu City was part of its plan to showcase a model for development in the SAARC region and place Addu City on the world map.

Among other projects that have been initiated during Sodiq's term in office are the Hulhumeedhoo Harbor and Sewerage Project, Feydhoo Harbor Project, and the Feydhoo and Maradhoo Road Construction Project with the assistance of the Government of Sri Lanka. Sodiq also banned single use plastic in the city.

Sodiq was reelected as mayor in 2014 and in 2017. In January 2020, Sodiq ran in the Maldivian Democratic Party's primary for the 2021 local election but lost to Ali Nizar.

=== Minister of State for National Planning, Housing and Infrastructure ===
In October 2021, President Ibrahim Mohamed Solih appointed Sodiq as the Minister of State for National Planning, Housing and Infrastructure. He was stationed in Addu City and oversaw infrastructure projects going in the city.

=== Member of the People's Majlis ===
Sodiq expressed interest in running for the Hithadhoo North parliamentary by-election after stating that many residents told him he should run. He won the MDP's ticket unopposed and ran against Ahmed Saeed of the People's National Congress. Sodiq won against Saeed with 1375 votes.

In June 2026, Sodiq took his oath of office as the member of the People's Majlis for the Hithadhoo North constituency. The MDP parliamentary group protested that Sodiq should be in "good committees" in the Majlis and not the ones that do the least work. Sodiq was later appointed to the Committee on Decentralization and the Committee on Environment and Climate Change.
