= Ali Nizar =

Mayor of Addu City since 2021

Mayor of Addu City
- Incumbent
- Assumed office 17 May 2021
- Preceded by: Abdulla Sodiq

Member of the People's Majlis
- In office 28 May 2014 – 28 May 2019
- Succeeded by: Ibrahim Nazil
- Constituency: Hithadhoo South

Personal details
- Party: Maldivian Democratic Party

Ali Nizar is a Maldivian politician who has served as Mayor of Addu City since 2021. A member of the Maldivian Democratic Party (MDP), he previously served as the member of the People's Majlis for the Hithadhoo South constituency in the 18th People's Majlis from 2014 to 2019.

Nizar was elected to Parliament in 2014 with 47.90 percent of the vote. Towards the end of his parliamentary term, he was appointed chief whip of the MDP's parliamentary group.

He won the MDP nomination for mayor in 2020, defeating incumbent mayor Abdulla Sodiq, and was elected mayor in the 2021 local council election. He was re-elected for a second term in the 2026 local council election.

== Political career ==
=== Member of Parliament ===
Nizar contested the Hithadhoo South constituency as the MDP candidate in the 2014 parliamentary election. He was elected with 47.90 percent of the vote and became a member of the 18th People's Majlis.

During his parliamentary tenure, Nizar participated in parliamentary and party affairs as a representative of southern Hithadhoo. In November 2018, the MDP appointed him as the chief whip of its parliamentary group. Mohamed Aslam, the representative for Hithadhoo North, was appointed parliamentary group leader at the same time. Both appointments were made without a vote because no other candidates contested the positions.

Nizar's term in Parliament concluded in 2019. He was succeeded as the representative for Hithadhoo South by Ibrahim Nazil.

=== 2020 MDP mayoral primary ===
Nizar sought the MDP nomination for mayor of Addu City ahead of the 2021 local council election. The party's primary was held on 31 January 2020.

He received 2,801 votes, defeating three-term incumbent mayor Abdulla Sodiq, who received 1,269 votes, and the president of the MDP's Addu branch, Ahmed Adhuham, who received 1,016 votes. Nizar's margin over Sodiq was 1,532 votes.

=== 2021 mayoral election ===
In the 2021 local council election, Nizar contested the Addu City mayoral position against Progressive Party of Maldives candidate Mohamed Latheef and independent candidate Ibrahim Thohir.

Nizar won the election with approximately 61 percent of the vote. Contemporary preliminary results reported 1,443 votes for Nizar, 1,018 for Latheef and 61 for Thohir.

Nizar was sworn in as mayor on 17 May 2021, succeeding Abdulla Sodiq.

=== Mayor of Addu City ===
As mayor, Nizar has advocated for decentralisation and greater authority for local councils. He has argued that the development of the atolls should be determined with the participation of local communities rather than being directed exclusively by the central government in Malé.

In August 2021, Nizar informed President Ibrahim Mohamed Solih that more than 60 Public Sector Investment Programme projects promised for Addu City were underway.

His council cooperated with the national government on projects involving roads, land reclamation, airport development and other infrastructure in Addu.

Nizar also advocated the construction of a bridge connecting Hulhumeedhoo with the western inhabited islands of Addu. In 2021, he said the council intended to present the proposal to President Solih.

In 2025, Nizar stated that Addu City had joined the Strong Cities Network. He was subsequently invited to serve on the network's International Steering Committee. His work with the network focused on community safety, social cohesion, women's participation and cooperation between local and national authorities.

Nizar has also publicly raised concerns about interruptions to electricity services and the selection of contractors for Addu's proposed central power station. In March 2026, he criticised the lack of publicly available information concerning a company awarded the USD 31 million power-station project.

=== 2026 re-election ===
Nizar was the only person to initially express interest in seeking the MDP nomination for mayor of Addu ahead of the 2026 local council election. The Elections Commission registered him as candidate number three. His registered permanent address was listed as Emtationge in Hithadhoo.

He contested the election against PNC candidate Mushrif Ali and independent candidate Mohamed Ahsam. Nizar was re-elected for a second term on 4 April 2026.

Published results recorded Nizar as receiving 8,775 votes, or approximately 65 percent of the valid mayoral vote. Mushrif Ali received 4,247 votes, or 31.4 percent, while Ahsam received 488 votes, or 3.6 percent.

Following the election, Nizar characterised the MDP's result in Addu as a message concerning the national government's approach to development and local governance.

== Political positions ==
=== Decentralisation ===
Nizar supports strengthening the authority of elected councils. He has argued that councils should cooperate with the national government while retaining the ability to determine local development priorities.

=== Addu development ===
Nizar has advocated infrastructure development in Addu, including roads, housing, land reclamation, reliable electricity services, airport development and improved transport connections between the city's islands.

=== Community resilience ===
Through Addu City's involvement in the Strong Cities Network, Nizar has promoted cooperation among councils, civil-society organisations and national institutions. He has also emphasised the participation of women and young people in local policymaking and community-safety programmes.

== Electoral history ==
=== Parliamentary elections ===
Election	Constituency	Party	Vote share	Result	Ref.
2014 parliamentary election	Hithadhoo South	Maldivian Democratic Party	47.90%	Won	

=== MDP primary elections ===
Election	Candidate	Votes	Result	Ref.
2020 MDP Addu mayoral primary	Ali Nizar	2,801	Won	
2020 MDP Addu mayoral primary	Abdulla Sodiq	1,269	Lost	
2020 MDP Addu mayoral primary	Ahmed Adhuham	1,016	Lost	

=== Mayoral elections ===
Election	Candidate	Party	Votes	Percentage	Result	Ref.
2021 local election	Ali Nizar	Maldivian Democratic Party	1,443	Approximately 61%	Won	
2021 local election	Mohamed Latheef	Progressive Party of Maldives	1,018	—	Lost	
2021 local election	Ibrahim Thohir	Independent	61	—	Lost	
2026 local election	Ali Nizar	Maldivian Democratic Party	8,775	65.0%	Won	
2026 local election	Mushrif Ali	People's National Congress	4,247	31.4%	Lost	
2026 local election	Mohamed Ahsam	Independent	488	3.6%	Lost	

== See also ==
- Addu City
