= Nezaz =

Nezaz نزاز
- Village
- Location within Iran
- Coordinates: 35°03′11″N 46°47′57″E
- Country: Iran
- Province: Kurdistan
- County: Kamyaran
- Bakhsh: Muchesh
- Rural District: Gavrud

Population (2006)
  - Total: 484
- Time zone: UTC+3:30 (IRST)
  - Summer (DST): UTC+4:30 (IRDT)

Nezaz (Persian: نزاز, also Romanized as Nezāz and Nazāz; also known as Najāj, Nazāzo, and Nezār) is a village in Gavrud Rural District, Muchesh District, Kamyaran County, Kurdistan Province, Iran. At the 2006 census, its population was 484, in 113 families. The village is populated by Kurds.
