= Presses Universitaires de Rennes =

French university press

- Parent company: Rennes 2 University
- Status: Active
- Founded: 1990
- Country of origin: France
- Headquarters location: Rennes
- Publication types: Books and Journals
- Official website: www.pur-editions.fr

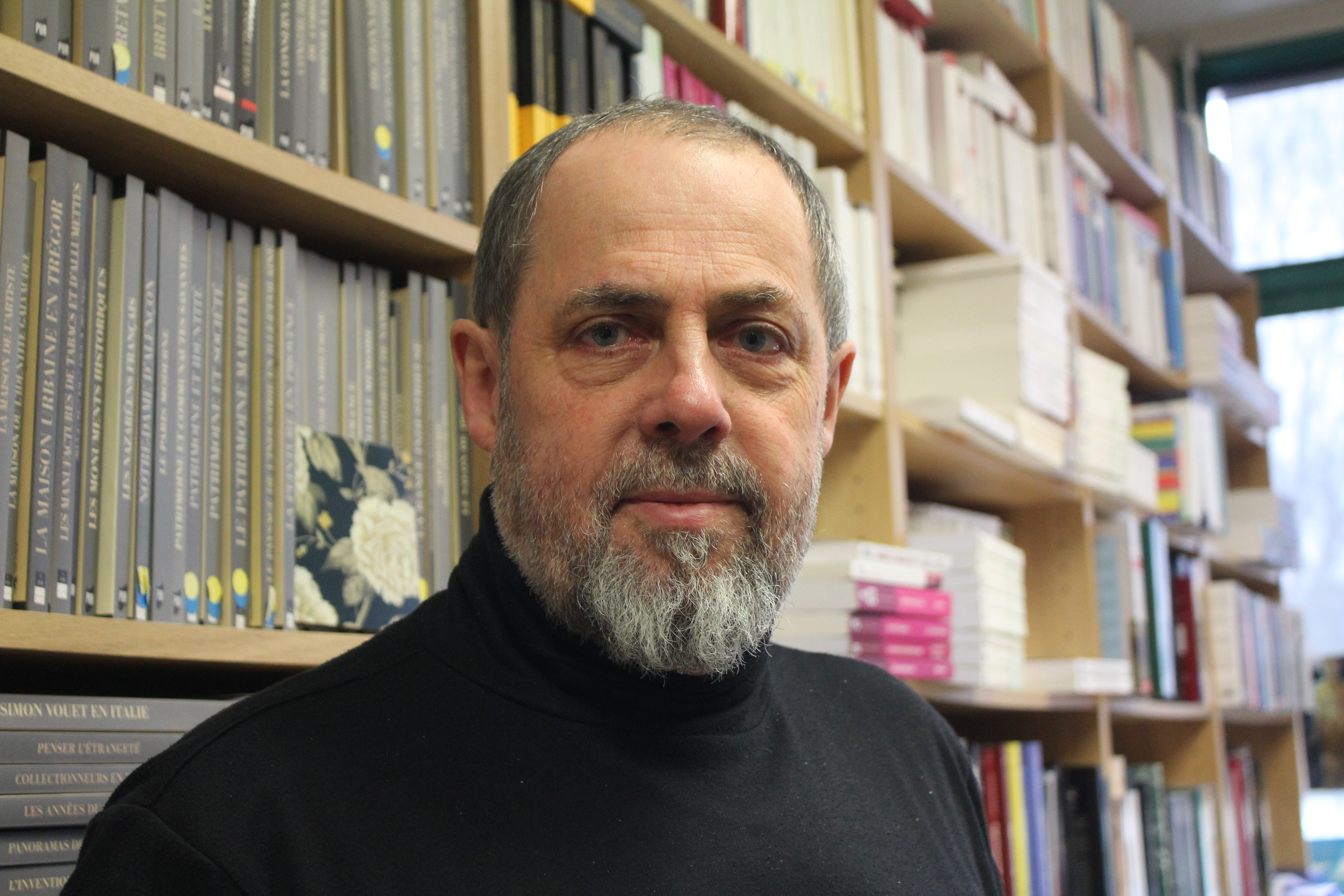
Pierre Corbel, Head Director of the PUR

The Presses Universitaires de Rennes or PUR (Rennes University Press) is a French university press located in Rennes in Brittany on the Rennes 2 University's La Harpe Campus. It belongs to this university but also publishes for other universities gathered in the Réseau des Université de l'Ouest Atlantique (University of Western Brittany, University of Southern Brittany, University of Rennes 1, University of Nantes, University of Angers, University of Maine (France), the University of La Rochelle and the François Rabelais University in Tours).
