= Religion in pre-Islamic Arabia =

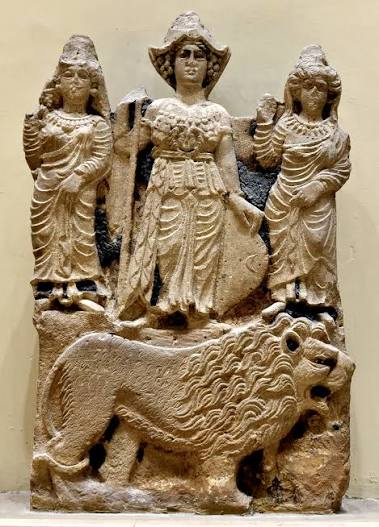
Arabian goddesses Al-Lat, Manat, Al-Uzza

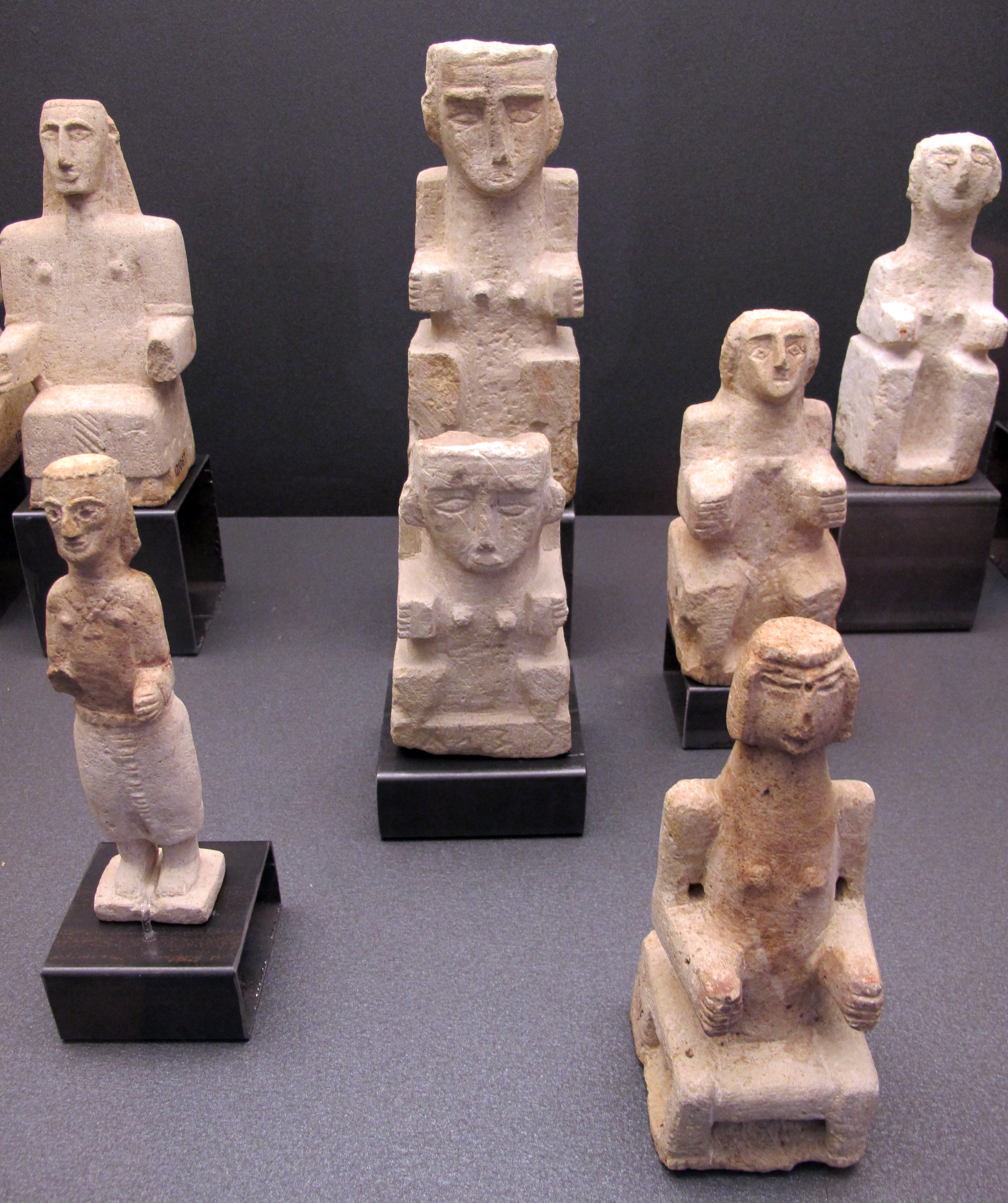
Alabaster-carved votive figurines from Yemen, now located in the National Museum of Oriental Art in the city of Rome

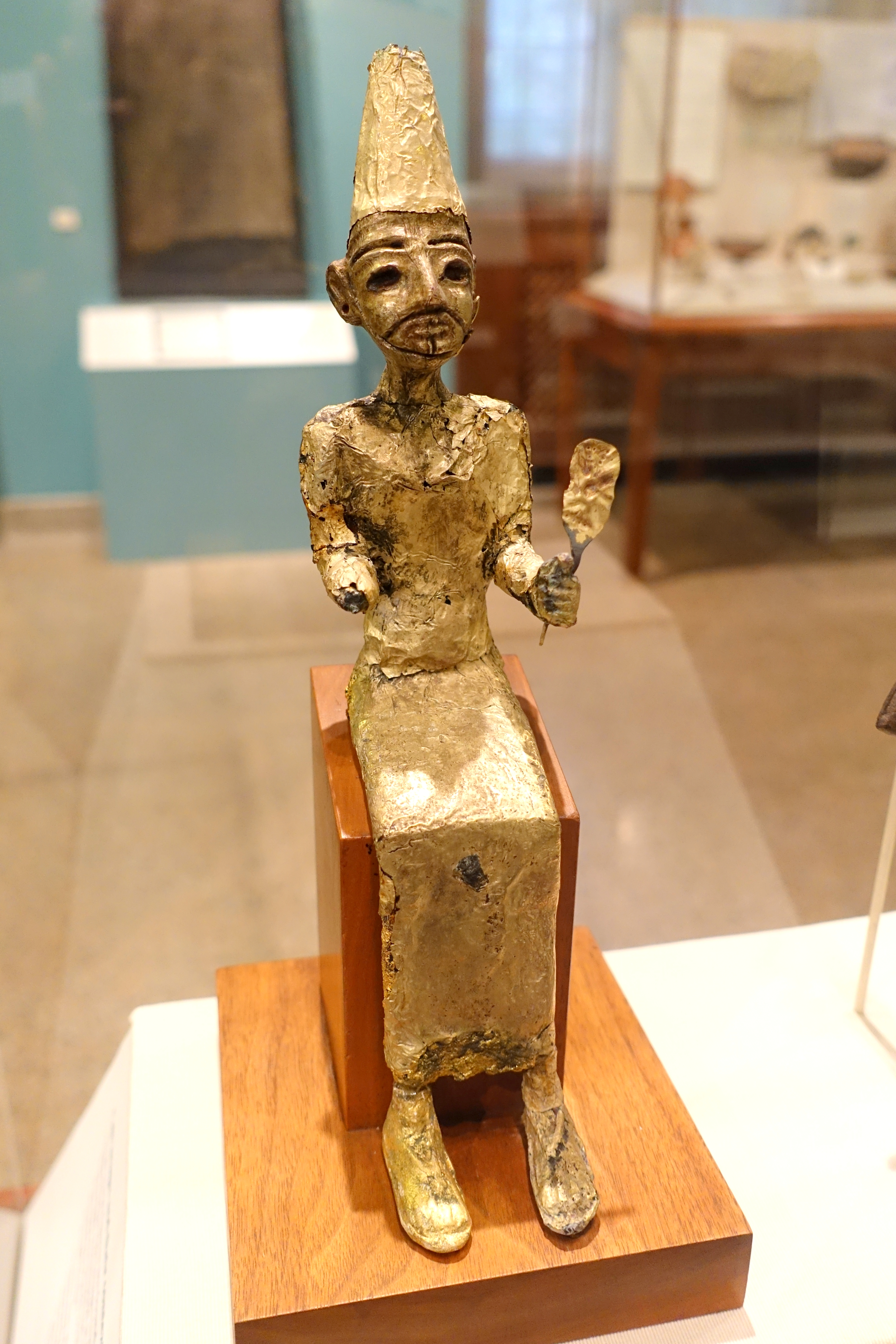
Gilded statue of the Canaanite creator god El (c. 1400–1200 BC) from the site of Tel Megiddo. El is considered to be the cognate of the word "Ilah" and continues to appear in compound names like Gabriel, Michael, Azrael, Israel, Ishmael, Samuel and Raphael.

In pre-Islamic Arabia, the dominant religious practice was that of Arab polytheism, which was based on the veneration of various deities and spirits, such as the god Hubal and the goddesses al-Lāt, al-‘Uzzā, and Manāt. Worship was centred on local shrines and temples, like the Kaaba in Mecca and the Temple of Awwam in Yemen. Deities were venerated and invoked through pilgrimages, divination, and ritual sacrifice, among other traditions. Many of the physical descriptions of the pre-Islamic gods and goddesses are traced to idols, especially near the Kaaba, which is said to have contained up to 360 of them.

Other religions, especially Christianity and Judaism, were also represented in the region, especially in the fourth to seventh centuries. The influence of the Roman Empire and the Kingdom of Aksum enabled the nurturing of Christian communities in northwestern, northeastern, and southern Arabia. In the other areas of the Arabian Peninsula, Christianity did not have as much of a presence, though it did secure some converts, and with the exception of Nestorianism in the northeast and around the Persian Gulf, the dominant form of the religion was Miaphysitism. Since the beginning of the Roman era, Jewish migration into Arabia had become increasingly frequent, resulting in the establishment of a prominent Jewish diaspora community, which was supplemented by local converts. Over time, Judaism formed large communities throughout southern Arabia and the northwestern Hejaz.

The influence of Persian empires, including the Parthians and Sasanians, aided a limited spread of Zoroastrianism, especially in Eastern and South Arabia. It is speculated that Zoroastrianism may have been practiced by some inhabitants of the Himyarite Kingdom, which was home to a mixed Arab–Persian community called al-Abnāʾ in Arabic. Tentative evidence may also support a presence of Manichaeism or Mazdakism in parts of the peninsula.

== Background and sources ==
Until about the fourth century, almost all inhabitants of Arabia practiced polytheistic religions at which point pre-Islamic Arabian monotheism had begun to spread. From the fourth to sixth centuries, Jewish, Christian, and other monotheistic populations developed. Until recent decades, it was believed that polytheism remained the dominant belief system in pre-Islamic Arabia, but some recent trends suggest that henotheism or monotheism was dominant from the fourth century onwards.

The contemporary sources of information regarding the pre-Islamic Arabian religion and pantheon include a growing number of pre-Islamic Arabian inscriptions, written in scripts like Safaitic, Sabaic, and Paleo-Arabic, pre-Islamic poetry, external sources such as Jewish and Greek accounts, as well as the Muslim tradition, such as the Qur'an and Islamic writings. Nevertheless, information is limited.

One early attestation of Arabian polytheism was in Esarhaddon's Annals, which mentions Atarsamain, Nukhay, Ruldaiu, and Atarquruma. Herodotus, writing in his Histories, reported that the Arabs worshipped Orotalt (identified with Dionysus) and Alilat (identified with Aphrodite). Strabo stated the Arabs worshipped Dionysus and Zeus. Origen stated they worshipped Dionysus and Urania.

Muslim sources regarding Arabian polytheism include the eighth-century Book of Idols by Hisham ibn al-Kalbi, which F.E. Peters argued to be the most substantial treatment of the religious practices of pre-Islamic Arabia, as well as the writings of the Yemeni historian al-Hasan al-Hamdani on South Arabian religious beliefs, crucially including the Crowns from the Accounts of the Yemen and the Genealogies of Himyar.

According to the Book of Idols, descendants of the son of Abraham (Ishmael) who had settled in Mecca migrated to other lands and carried holy stones from the Kaaba with them, erected them, and circumambulated them like the Kaaba. This, according to al-Kalbi led to the rise of idol worship. Based on this, it may be probable that Arabs originally venerated stones, later adopting idol-worship under foreign influences. The relationship between a god and a stone as his representation can be seen from the third-century Syriac work called the Homily of Pseudo-Meliton where he describes the pagan faiths of Syriac-speakers in northern Mesopotamia, who were mostly Arabs. However, mythologies and narratives elucidating the history of these gods, as well as the meaning of their epithets, remain uninformative.

== Religious traditions ==
=== Arabian polytheism ===
Arabian polytheism was not a single organized religion, but a range of local and regional cults with their own deities, spirits, cultic places, objects, ritual specialists (like diviners) and cultic practices (like pilgrimage). Before the spread of Judaism, Christianity and other monotheistic traditions in late antiquity, most inhabitants of Arabia appear to have practiced some form of polytheism. The surviving inscriptions preserve many divine names, since one of their most common purposes was to invoke a deity, usually in petition or thanksgiving. The texts are too short for historians to be able to reconstruct the theology or mythology of the Arabian polytheistic religions in any detail, but these gods were generally invoked for aids regarding affairs beyond human control, such as rain, fertility, health, protection, love, death and security.

How Arabian polytheism was practiced varied considerably by region. The kingdoms of South Arabia developed large pantheons. The god ʿAthtar often occupied the highest position in the pantheon, while the main smaller South Arabian peoples had their own distinct patron deities: Almaqah among the Sabaeans, Wadd among the Minaeans, ʿAmm among the Qatabanians and Sayin among the Hadramites. These high gods, or patron deities, were closely tied with local politics and social organization. In less complex societies, pantheons could be smaller and focused more strongly on a local patron, such as Dhu Ghaba at Dedan or Dushara among the Nabataeans; other deities, including al-ʿUzzā, Manāt, Allāt, Hubal, Shayʿ al-Qawm and foreign deities such as Isis, appear in particular regional, political or mercantile contexts.

The religious life of nomadic groups is known especially from Safaitic inscriptions, which were produced before the significant spread of Judaism and Christianity among the nomads of northern Arabia. These inscriptions show a practical religious world in which worshippers invoked deities for security, aid, reunion with family or companions, relief, vengeance, healing, protection during travel and success in dangerous activities. Animal sacrifice is regularly mentioned and was invoked in numerous contexts including raiding, journeys, seasonal movement or other uncertain situations. Safaitic inscriptions also attest other practices like cult stones (nṣb, mṣb, or mnṣb(t)), offerings, vows, oaths, pilgrimage, ritual shelters and appeals to sacred water.

=== Monotheism and henotheism ===
In the fourth century, during Arabia's transition into late antiquity, it became increasingly common to only believe in or only invoke one God. In South Arabia, all gods quickly cease to be mentioned except for Rahmanan in the second half of the fourth century. Elsewhere, especially in northern and Western Arabia, inscriptions begin to only invoke Allah by the fifth and sixth centuries. These trends were companied by the rise of Christianity and Judaism in the peninsula, but not all monotheists were Christians or Jews. Gentile monotheists are called hanif in Islamic sources.

=== Judaism ===
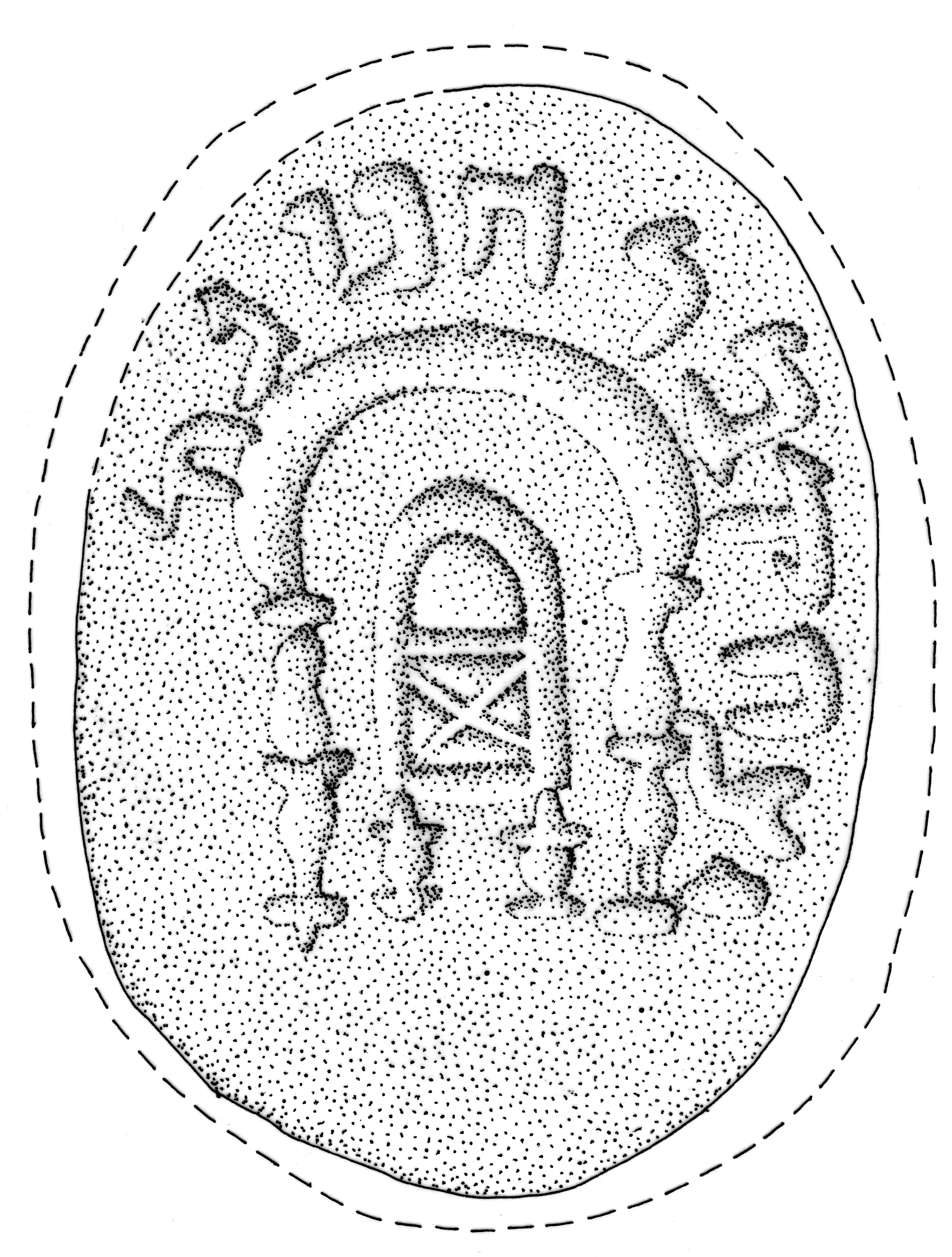
Seal ring from Zafar with writing "Yishaq bar Hanina" and a Torah ark, 330 BC – 200 AD

A thriving community of Jewish tribes existed in pre-Islamic Arabia and included both sedentary and nomadic communities. Jews had migrated into Arabia from Roman times onwards. Arabian Jews spoke Arabic as well as Hebrew and Aramaic and had contact with Jewish religious centres in Babylonia and Palestine. The Yemeni Himyarites converted to Judaism in the 4th century, and some of the Kinda were also converted in the 4th/5th century. Jewish tribes existed in all major Arabian towns during Muhammad's time including in Tayma and Khaybar as well as Medina with twenty tribes living in the peninsula. From tomb inscriptions, it is visible that Jews also lived in Mada'in Saleh and Al-'Ula.

There is evidence that Jewish converts in the Hejaz were regarded as Jews by other Jews, as well as by non-Jews, and sought advice from Babylonian rabbis on matters of attire and kosher food. In at least one case, it is known that an Arab tribe agreed to adopt Judaism as a condition for settling in a town dominated by Jewish inhabitants. Some Arab women in Yathrib/Medina are said to have vowed to make their child a Jew if the child survived, since they considered the Jews to be people "of knowledge and the book" (ʿilmin wa-kitābin). Philip Hitti infers from proper names and agricultural vocabulary that the Jewish tribes of Yathrib consisted mostly of Judaized clans of Arabian and Aramaean origin.

The key role played by Jews in the trade and markets of the Hejaz meant that market day for the week was the day preceding the Jewish Sabbath. This day, which was called aruba in Arabic, also provided occasion for legal proceedings and entertainment, which in turn may have influenced the choice of Friday as the day of Muslim congregational prayer. Toward the end of the sixth century, the Jewish communities in the Hejaz were in a state of economic and political decline, but they continued to flourish culturally in and beyond the region. They had developed their distinctive beliefs and practices, with a pronounced mystical and eschatological dimension. In the Islamic tradition, based on a phrase in the Quran, Arab Jews are said to have referred to Uzair as the son of Allah, although the historical accuracy of this assertion has been disputed.

Jewish agriculturalists lived in the region of Eastern Arabia. According to Robert Bertram Serjeant, the Baharna may be the Arabized "descendants of converts from Christians (Arameans), Jews and ancient Persians (Majus) inhabiting the island and cultivated coastal provinces of Eastern Arabia at the time of the Arab conquest". From the Islamic sources, it seems that Judaism was the religion most followed in Yemen. Ya'qubi claimed all Yemenites to be Jews; Ibn Hazm however states only Himyarites and some Kindites were Jews.

=== Christianity ===
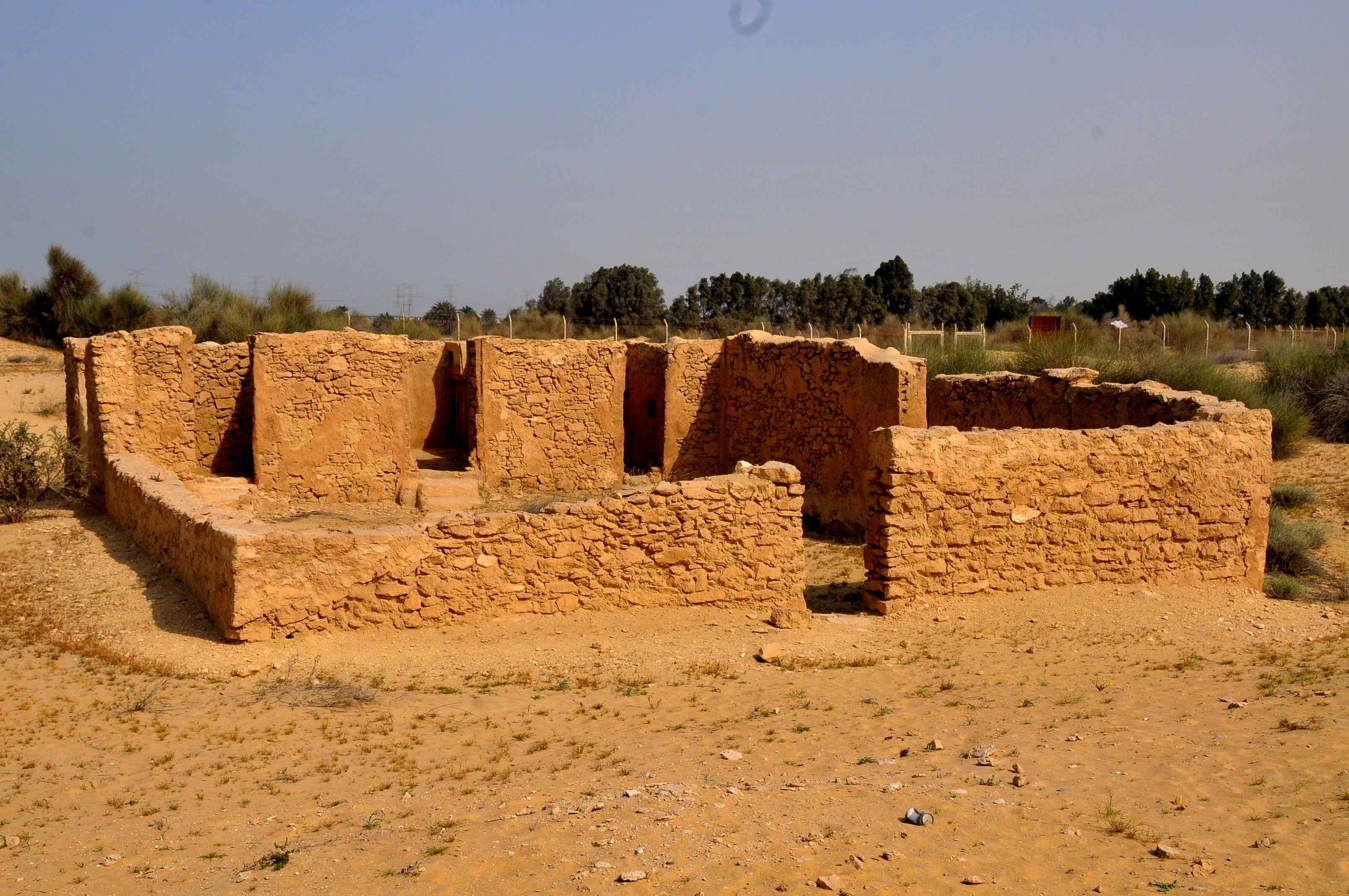
Jubail Church in eastern Saudi Arabia. The 4th century remains are thought to be one of the oldest surviving church buildings in the world.

The main areas of Christian influence in Arabia were on the northeastern and northwestern borders and in what was to become Yemen in the south. The north west was under the influence of Christian missionary activity from the Roman Empire where the Ghassanids, a client kingdom of the Romans, were converted to Christianity. In the south, particularly at Najran, a centre of Christianity developed as a result of the influence of the Christian Kingdom of Axum based on the other side of the Red Sea in Ethiopia. Some of the Banu Harith had converted to Christianity. One family of the tribe built a large church at Najran called Deir Najran, also known as the "Ka'ba of Najran". Both the Ghassanids and the Christians in the south adopted Monophysitism.

The third area of Christian influence was on the north eastern borders where the Lakhmids, a client tribe of the Sassanians, adopted Nestorianism, being the form of Christianity having the most influence in the Sassanian Empire. As the Persian Gulf region of Arabia increasingly fell under the influence of the Sassanians from the early third century, many of the inhabitants were exposed to Christianity following the eastward dispersal of the religion by Mesopotamian Christians. However, it was not until the fourth century that Christianity gained popularity in the region with the establishment of monasteries and a diocesan structure.

In pre-Islamic times, the population of Eastern Arabia consisted of Christianized Arabs (including Abd al-Qays) and Aramean Christians among other religions. Syriac functioned as a liturgical language. Serjeant states that the Baharna may be the Arabized descendants of converts from the original population of Christians (Aramaeans), among other religions at the time of Arab conquests. Beth Qatraye, which translates "region of the Qataris" in Syriac, was the Christian name used for the region encompassing north-eastern Arabia. It included Bahrain, Tarout Island, Al-Khatt, Al-Hasa, and Qatar. Oman and what is today the United Arab Emirates comprised the diocese known as Beth Mazunaye. The name was derived from 'Mazun', the Persian name for Oman and the United Arab Emirates. Sohar was the central city of the diocese.

In Nejd, in the centre of the peninsula, there is evidence of members of two tribes, Kinda and Taghlib, converting to Christianity in the 6th century. However, in the Hejaz in the west, whilst there is evidence of the presence of Christianity, it is not thought to have been significant amongst the indigenous population of the area.

Arabicized Christian names were fairly common among pre-Islamic Arabians, which has been attributed to the influence that Syrianized Christian Arabs had on Bedouins of the peninsula for several centuries before the rise of Islam.

=== Iranian religions ===
Though they lack any surviving physical evidence, a Persian presence in the Peninsula on account of Sasanian military presence and through trade may have introduced Iranian religions into the Arabian Peninsula, and evidence for the presence of Iranian religious ideas may be found in Persian loanwords in the Quran, such as firdaws (paradise). Qatrayith, an extinct language of pre-Islamic Eastern Arabia, also has a large number of Persian loanwords, accounting for 14% of its known lexicon. According to Al-Ya'qubi, Kavad I convinced the ruler of Kinda to promote Mazdakism.

According to Islamic-era sources, principally Hisham ibn al-Kalbi and later sources which echo his reports, Arabs in northeast of the peninsula converted to Zoroastrianism and several Zoroastrian temples were constructed in Najd. Ibn al-Kalbi also suggests Manichaeism (or Mazdakism) in Arabia on account of the "zandaqas" he mentions in Mecca. However, according to the most recent research, the prevalence of Manichaeism in Mecca during the 6th and 7th centuries, when Islam emerged, can not be proven, and Ibn al-Kalbi's writings are not likely to provide reliable insights into the circulation of Manichaeism and Mazdakism in pre-Islamic Mecca according to the latest work of Trompf & Mikkelsen et al.

Zoroastrianism was also present in Eastern Arabia and Persian-speaking Zoroastrians lived in the region. The religion was introduced in the region including modern-day Bahrain during the rule of Persian empires in the region starting from 250 B.C. It was mainly practiced in Bahrain by Persian settlers. Zoroastrianism was also practiced in the Persian-ruled area of modern-day Oman. The religion also existed in Persian-ruled area of modern Yemen. The descendants of Abna, the Persian conquerors of Yemen, were followers of Zoroastrianism.

Yemen's Zoroastrians who had the jizya imposed on them after being conquered by Muhammad are mentioned by the Islamic historian al-Baladhuri. According to Serjeant, the Baharna people may be the Arabized descendants of converts from the original population of ancient Persians (majus) as well as other religions.

=== Buddhism and Indian religions ===
There are some Islamic documents that, when describing the state of religion in pre-Islamic Arabia, include a presence of Buddhism. One recurring theme in these depictions is that the Buddhist community was able to store some of their idols in the Kaaba. Rashid al-Din Hamadani (d. 1318), in his Jāmiʾ al-Tawārīkh, says both that Buddhist idols could be found in the Kaaba and that both Arabs and some Persians on the peninsula saw themselves as students of the Buddha. One Islamic miniature from the thirteenth century depicts Muhammad destroying Hindu and Buddhist idols at the Kaaba. Al-Masudi said that Buddhists see the Kaaba as one of their temples. Al-Masudi also depicts the Quraysh tribe of Mecca as having gold-plated deer statues, which were then seen as typical Buddhist symbols. Mostafa Vaziri has speculated about a possible historicity to these descriptions, suggesting that Buddhism reached Arabia through Indian merchants and trade routes. Vaziri also speculates an influence of Buddhist architecture on the design of the Kaaba, such as from the Nawbahār and other Buddhist stupas.

== Supernatural beings ==
=== Pantheons ===
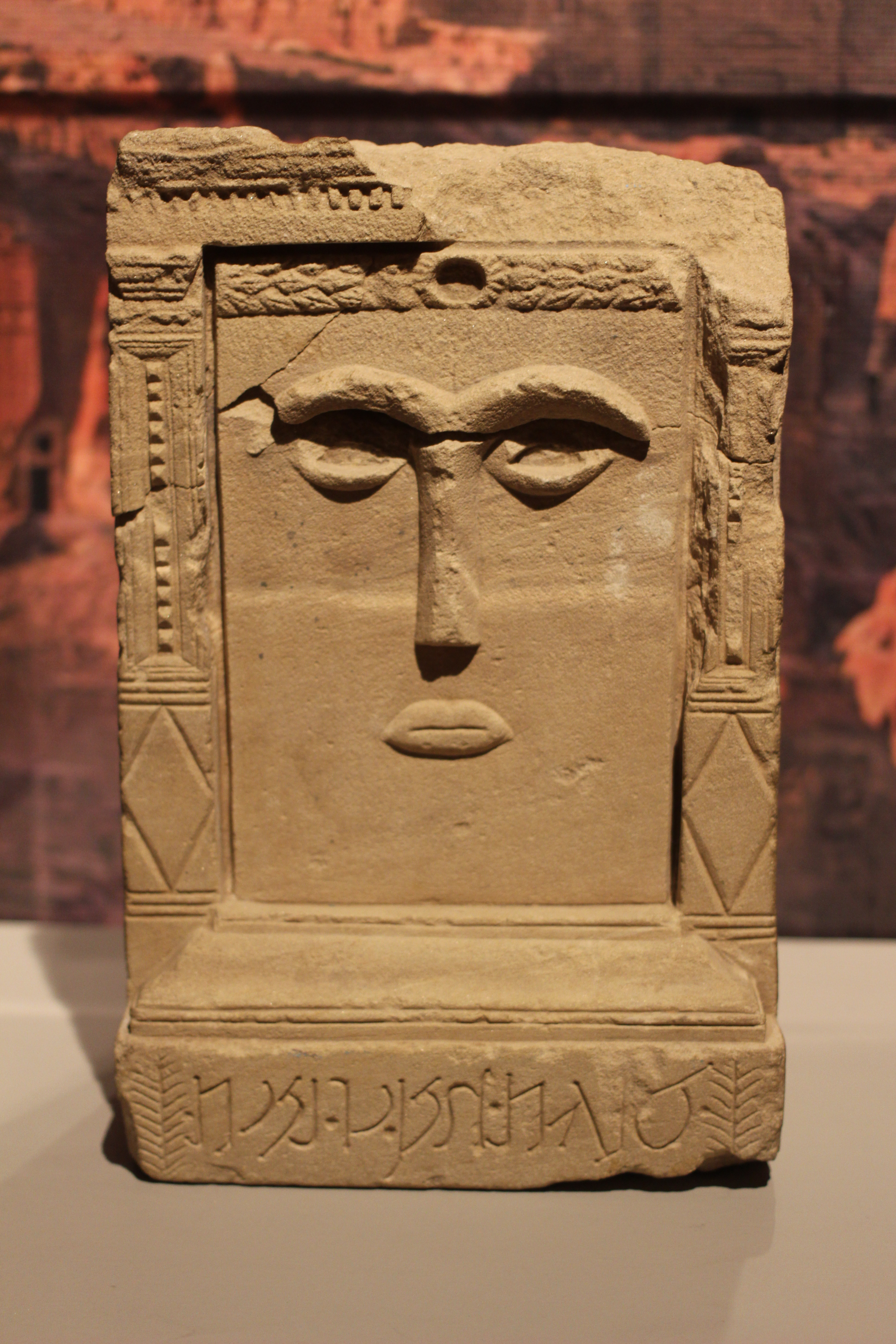
Nabataean baetyl depicting a goddess, possibly al-Uzza.

The pre-Islamic Arabian religions were polytheistic, with many of the deities' names known. Formal pantheons are more noticeable at the level of kingdoms, of variable sizes, ranging from simple city-states to collections of tribes. Tribes, towns, clans, lineages and families had their own cults too. Christian Julien Robin suggests that this structure of the divine world reflected the society of the time. Trade caravans also brought foreign religious and cultural influences. A large number of deities did not have proper names and were referred to by titles indicating a quality, a family relationship, or a locale preceded by "he who" or "she who" (dhū or dhāt respectively).

The religious beliefs and practices of the nomadic Bedouin were distinct from those of the settled tribes of towns such as Mecca. Nomadic religious belief systems and practices are believed to have included fetishism, totemism and veneration of the dead but were connected principally with immediate concerns and problems and did not consider larger philosophical questions such as the afterlife. Settled urban Arabs, on the other hand, are thought to have believed in a more complex pantheon of deities. While the Meccans and the other settled inhabitants of the Hejaz worshiped their gods at permanent shrines in towns and oases, the Bedouin practiced their religion on the move.

=== Minor spirits ===
In South Arabia, mndh’t were anonymous guardian spirits of the community and the ancestor spirits of the family. They were known as 'the sun (shms) of their ancestors'.

In North Arabia, ginnaye were known from Palmyrene inscriptions as "the good and rewarding gods" and were probably related to the jinn of west and central Arabia. Unlike jinn in modern times, ginnaye could not hurt nor possess humans and were much more similar to the Roman genius. According to common Arabian belief, soothsayers, pre-Islamic philosophers, and poets were inspired by the jinn. However, jinn were also feared and thought to be responsible for causing various diseases and mental illnesses.

=== Malevolent beings ===
Aside from benevolent gods and spirits, there existed malevolent beings. These beings were not attested in the epigraphic record, but were alluded to in pre-Islamic Arabic poetry, and their legends were collected by later Muslim authors.

Commonly mentioned are ghouls. Etymologically, the English word "ghoul" was derived from the Arabic ghul, from ghala, "to seize", related to the Sumerian galla. They are said to have a hideous appearance, with feet like those of an ass. Arabs were said to utter the following couplet if they should encounter one: "Oh ass-footed one, just bray away, we won't leave the desert plain nor ever go astray."

Christian Julien Robin notes that all the known South Arabian divinities had a positive or protective role and that evil powers were only alluded to but were never personified.

=== Roles of deities ===
==== Role of Allah ====
Some scholars postulate that in pre-Islamic Arabia, including in Mecca, Allah was considered to be a deity, possibly a creator deity or a supreme deity in a polytheistic pantheon. The word Allah (from the Arabic al-ilah meaning "the god") may have been used as a title rather than a name. The concept of Allah may have been vague in the Meccan religion. According to Islamic sources, Meccans and their neighbors believed that the goddesses Al-lāt, Al-‘Uzzá, and Manāt were the daughters of Allah.

Regional variants of the word Allah occur in both pagan and Christian pre-Islamic inscriptions. References to Allah are found in the poetry of the pre-Islamic Arab poet Zuhayr bin Abi Sulma, who lived a generation before Muhammad, as well as pre-Islamic personal names. Muhammad's father's name was ʿAbd-Allāh, meaning "the servant of Allah".

Charles Russell Coulter and Patricia Turner considered that Allah's name may be derived from a pre-Islamic god called Ailiah and is similar to El, Il, Ilah, and Jehovah. They also considered some of his characteristics to be seemingly based on lunar deities like Almaqah, Kahl, Shaker, Wadd and Warakh. Alfred Guillaume states that the connection between Ilah that came to form Allah and ancient Babylonian Il or El of ancient Israel is not clear. Wellhausen states that Allah was known from Jewish and Christian sources and was known to pagan Arabs as the supreme god. Winfried Corduan doubts the theory of Allah of Islam being linked to a moon god, stating that the term Allah functions as a generic term, like the term El-Elyon used as a title for the god Sin.

South Arabian inscriptions from the fourth century AD refer to a god called Rahman ("The Merciful One") who had a monotheistic cult and was referred to as the "Lord of heaven and Earth". Aaron W. Hughes states that scholars are unsure whether he developed from the earlier polytheistic systems or developed due to the increasing significance of the Christian and Jewish communities, and that it is difficult to establish whether Allah was linked to Rahman. Maxime Rodinson, however, considers one of Allah's names, "Ar-Rahman", to have been used in the form of Rahmanan earlier.

==== Al-Lat, al-Uzza and Manat ====
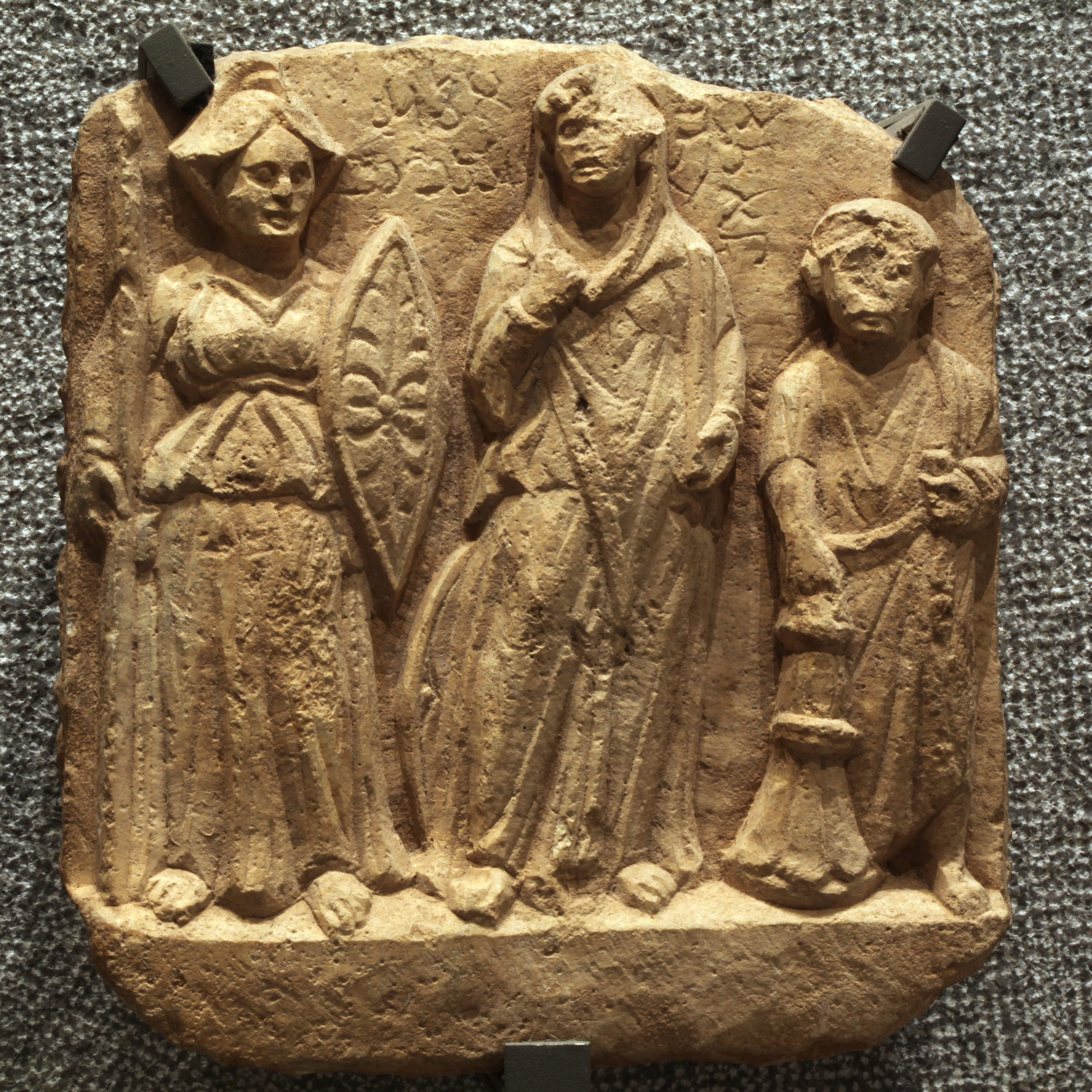
Bas-relief: Nemesis, al-Lat and the dedicator. Palmyrene, 2nd–3rd century AD.

Al-Lāt, Al-‘Uzzá and Manāt were common names used for multiple goddesses across Arabia. G. R. Hawting states that modern scholars have frequently associated the names of Arabian goddesses Al-lāt, Al-‘Uzzá and Manāt with cults devoted to celestial bodies, particularly Venus, drawing upon evidence external to the Muslim tradition as well as in relation to Syria, Mesopotamia and the Sinai Peninsula.

Allāt (Arabic: اللات) or al-Lāt was worshipped throughout the ancient Near East with various associations. Herodotus in the 5th century BC identifies Alilat (Greek: Ἀλιλάτ) as the Arabic name for Aphrodite (and, in another passage, for Urania), which is strong evidence for worship of Allāt in Arabia at that early date. Al-‘Uzzá (Arabic: العزى) was a fertility goddess or possibly a goddess of love. Manāt (Arabic: مناة) was the goddess of destiny.

Al-Lāt's cult was spread in Syria and northern Arabia. From Safaitic and Hismaic inscriptions, it is probable that she was worshiped as Lat (lt). F. V. Winnet saw al-Lat as a lunar deity due to the association of a crescent with her in 'Ayn esh-Shallāleh and a Lihyanite inscription mentioning the name of Wadd, the Minaean moon god, over the title of fkl lt. René Dussaud and Gonzague Ryckmans linked her with Venus while others have thought her to be a solar deity. John F. Healey considers that al-Uzza actually might have been an epithet of al-Lāt before becoming a separate deity in the Meccan pantheon. Paola Corrente, writing in Redefining Dionysus, considers she might have been a god of vegetation or a celestial deity of atmospheric phenomena and a sky deity.

== Religious authority and roles ==
=== Priests and sanctuary officials ===
Sacred areas often had a guardian or a performer of cultic rites. These officials were thought to tend the area, receive offerings, and perform divination. They are known by many names, probably based on cultural-linguistic preference: afkal was used in the Hejaz, kâhin was used in the Sinai-Negev-Hisma region, and kumrâ was used in Aramaic-influenced areas. In South Arabia, rs^{2}w and 'fkl were used to refer to priests, and other words include qyn ("administrator") and mrtd ("consecrated to a particular divinity"). A more specialized staff is thought to have existed in major sanctuaries.

=== Astrologers and diviners ===
The ancient Arabs that inhabited the Arabian Peninsula before the advent of Islam used to profess a widespread belief in fatalism (ḳadar) alongside a fearful consideration for the sky and the stars, which they held to be ultimately responsible for every phenomenon that occurs on Earth and for the destiny of humankind. Accordingly, they shaped their entire lives in accordance with their interpretations of astral configurations and phenomena.

Since South Arabia, oracles were regarded as ms’l, or "a place of asking", and that deities interacted by hr’yhw ("making them see") a vision, a dream, or even direct interaction. Otherwise deities interacted indirectly through a medium.

There were three methods of chance-based divination attested in pre-Islamic Arabia; two of these methods, making marks in the sand or on rocks and throwing pebbles are poorly attested. The other method, the practice of randomly selecting an arrow with instructions, was widely attested and was common throughout Arabia. A simple form of this practice was reportedly performed before the image of Dhu'l-Khalasa by a certain man, sometimes said to be the Kindite poet Imru al-Qays according to al-Kalbi. A more elaborate form of the ritual was performed in before the image of Hubal. This form of divination was also attested in Palmyra, evidenced by an honorific inscription in the temple of al-Lat.

=== Soothsayers ===
A distinct form of religious specialist in pre-Islamic Arabia was the kāhin (fem. kāhina), usually rendered "soothsayer". The act of soothsaying belongs to the broader practice of kihāna, or divination: the attempt to know what cannot normally be known. Unlike astrologers, physiognomists, interpreters of omens, and other practitioners who used external techniques, the kāhin was especially associated with inspired or intuitive access to hidden knowledge. The Arabian kāhin was not a priest, but a soothsayer whose authority was tied with ecstatic inspiration from a supernatural being, particularly a spirit or a jinn.

The utterances of the kahin were commonly associated with sajʿ, a short rhymed and rhythmic prose also used in other elevated or mantic forms of speech. Oral pronouncements form kahin formed one of several oral registers in pre-Islamic Arabia, alongside the speech of poets, orators, and storytellers, and these registers have also formed the basis for comparisons with the speech in the Quran.

Diviners were among the main religious experts visible in the Arabic evidence for pre-Islamic tribal society. Kāhins and kāhinas could be consulted about travel, marriage, lost animals, theft, illness, dreams, ancestry, future events, and military action. Some were associated with local sanctuaries, while others operated independently.

=== Prophets and prophetic claimants ===
Islamic tradition preserves accounts of several Arabian figures who claimed to be Prophets from the early sixth to the late seventh centuries besides Muhammad. Christian J. Robin argues that these reports point to a broader prophetic movement in late sixth- and early seventh-century Arabia, not simply to isolated impostors, and that many of these figures wielded both religious and political authority, with a few being participants in the Ridda Wars. The sources mention Khaled bin Sinan, a prophet of the tribe of Banu Abs who was said to have lived a generation before Muhammad; Saf ibn Sayyad, a Jewish person in Medina and opponent of Muhammad; and four more political-religious figures including Musaylima of Yamama who was militarily defeated during the Ridda Wars; Al-Aswad al-Ansi in Yemen, Tulayha ibn Khuwaylid among the Banu Asad, and Sajah bint al-Harith among the Banu Tamim.

According to Robin, the Arabian prophet was marked by recognizable social signs: distinctive clothing such as a cloak, obscure or allusive speech, rhythmic and rhymed proclamation, oaths, questions and answers, natural images interpreted as signs of divine power, and the claim to receive revelation through an intermediary such as Gabriel or another biblical figure. Such prophets could also found or lead communities, combining religious and political authority in a way Robin considers characteristic of the Arabian context. Although prophetic figures resembled poets and diviners inspired by spirits, Robin argues that the Arabian prophetic movement should not be explained simply as a survival of pagan divination. Instead, it developed in regions strongly affected by Judaism, Christianity, and Manichaeism, borrowing concepts and vocabulary from those traditions while offering rival, local claims to divine revelation.

=== Christian clergy and monks ===
Monasteries were centers of Christian scholarship, intellectual activity, and theology. Four monasteries have been discovered in Eastern Arabia and one monastery has been found in northern Saudi Arabia. They are also documented, in inscriptions and literary sources, in South Arabia. Syriac Christian churches may have trained and helped run these monasteries. The practice of monasticism is criticized regularly in the Quran.

== Practices ==
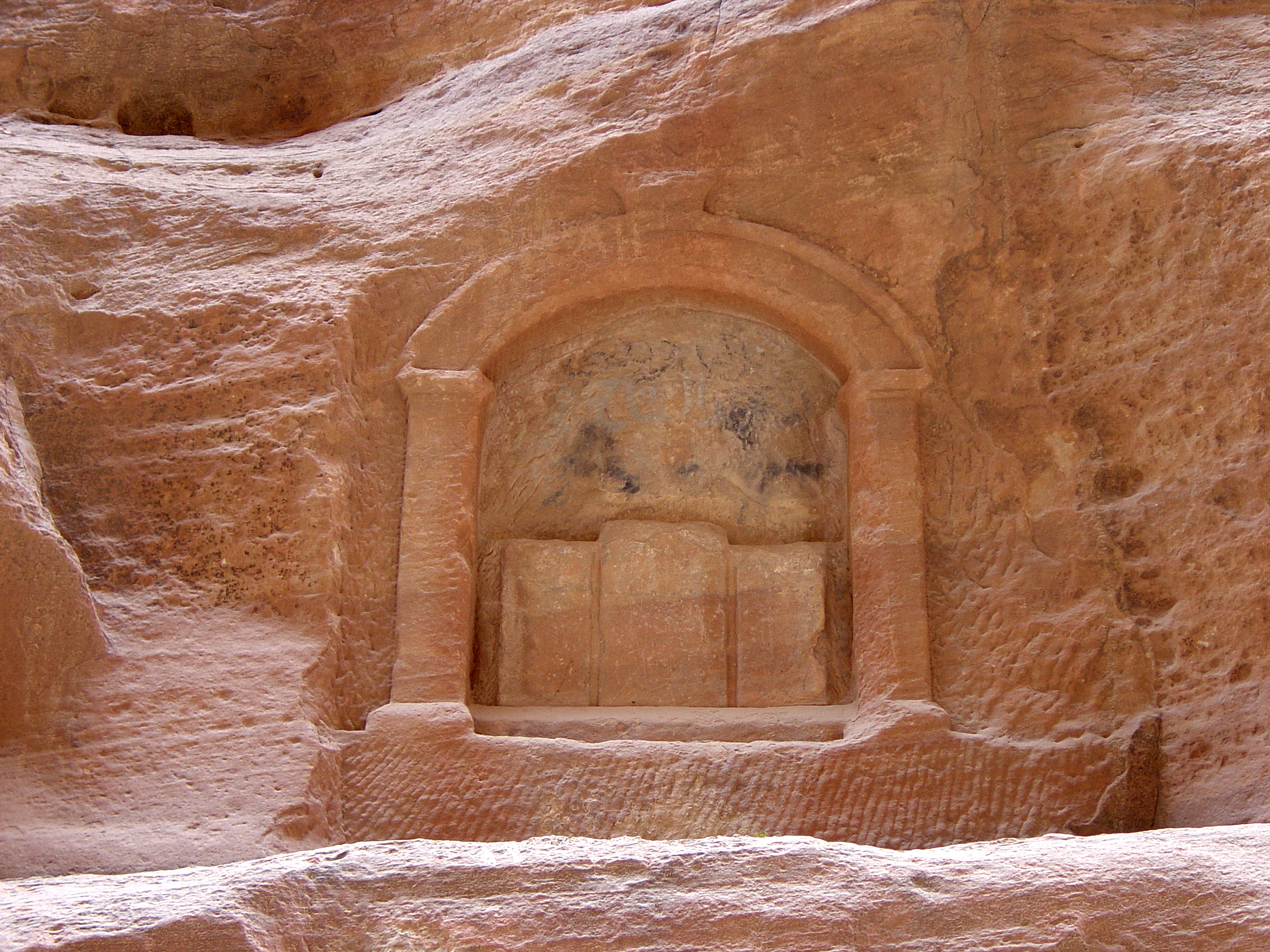
Stone-carved god-stones in Petra, Jordan.

=== Cult images and idols ===
The worship of sacred stones constituted one of the most important practices of the Semitic speaking peoples, including Arabs. Cult images of a deity were most often an unworked stone block. The most common name for these stone blocks was derived from the Semitic nsb ("to be stood upright"), but other names were used, such as Nabataean masgida ("place of prostration") and Arabic duwar ("object of circumambulation", this term often occurs in pre-Islamic Arabic poetry). These god-stones were usually a free-standing slab, but Nabataean god-stones are usually carved directly on the rock face. Facial features may be incised on the stone (especially in Nabataea), or astral symbols (especially in South Arabia). Under Greco-Roman influence, an anthropomorphic statue might be used instead.

The Book of Idols describes two types of statues: idols (sanam) and images (wathan). If a statue were made of wood, gold, or silver, after a human form, it would be an idol, but if the statue were made of stone, it would be an image.

Representation of deities in animal-form was common in South Arabia, such as the god Sayin from Hadhramaut, who was represented as either an eagle fighting a serpent or a bull. S(ay)in's name is inscribed 𐩪𐩺𐩬 (syn) in monumental Ancient South Arabian script on coins minted in the Kingdom of Hadramaut between the 1st and 3rd centuries CE. The name is accompanied variously by images of eagles, a head with radiating rays, or a bull with a crescent moon between its horns, all of which are thought to be symbols associated with local astral cults in the kingdom.

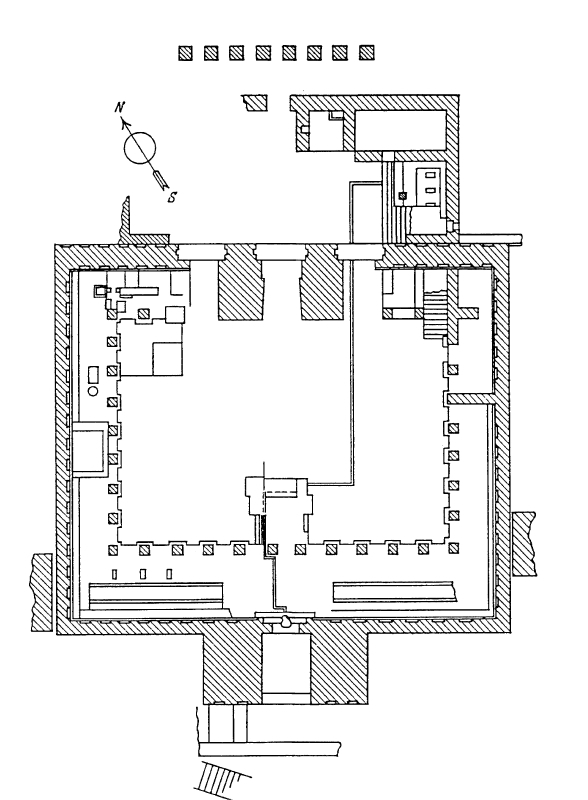
Floor-plan of the peristyle hall of the Awwam temple in Ma'rib.

=== Sacred places ===
Sacred places were known as hima, haram or mahram, and within these places, all living things were considered inviolable and violence was forbidden. In most of Arabia, these places would take the form of open-air sanctuaries, with distinguishing natural features such as springs and forests. Cities would contain temples, enclosing the sacred area with walls, and featuring ornate structures.

=== Pilgrimages ===
Pre-Islamic Arabia was a region of many pilgrimage rituals beyond that of Hajj. Many words in Arabian languages were used to describe pilgrimage, including the Semitic ḥgg. The most important pilgrimage ritual in South Arabia was the one to the Temple of Awwam, dedicated to the god Almaqah, which was associated with a ḥaram or maḥram. A number of other South Arabian deities were also associated with special sanctuaries and pilgrimages, including Dhu Samawi, Qaynan, Siyan, and several more.

Pilgrimages to sacred places would be made at certain times of the year. Pilgrim fairs of central and northern Arabia took place in specific months designated as violence-free, allowing several activities to flourish, such as trade, though in some places only exchange was permitted.

==== South Arabian pilgrimages ====
The most important pilgrimage in Saba' was probably the pilgrimage of Almaqah at Ma'rib, performed in the month of dhu-Abhi (roughly in July). Two references attest the pilgrimage of Almaqah dhu-Hirran at 'Amran. The pilgrimage of Ta'lab Riyam took place in Mount Tur'at and the Zabyan temple at Hadaqan, while the pilgrimage of Dhu-Samawi, the god of the Amir tribe, took place in Yathill. Aside from Sabaean pilgrimages, the pilgrimage of Sayin took place at Shabwa.

==== Meccan pilgrimage ====
The pilgrimage of Mecca involved the stations of Mount Arafat, Muzdalifah, Mina and central Mecca that included Safa and Marwa as well as the Kaaba. Pilgrims at the first two stations performed wuquf or standing in adoration. At Mina, animals were sacrificed. The procession from Arafat to Muzdalifah, and from Mina to Mecca, in a pre-reserved route towards idols or an idol, was termed ijaza and ifada, with the latter taking place before sunset. At Jabal Quzah, fires were started during the sacred month.

Nearby the Kaaba was located the betyl which was later called Maqam Ibrahim; a place called al-Ḥigr which Aziz al-Azmeh takes to be reserved for consecrated animals, basing his argument on a Sabaean inscription mentioning a place called mḥgr which was reserved for animals; and the Well of Zamzam. Both Safa and Marwa were adjacent to two sacrificial hills, one called Muṭ'im al Ṭayr and another Mujāwir al-Riḥ which was a pathway to Abu Kubais from where the Black Stone is reported to have originated.

==== Cult associations ====
Meccan pilgrimages differed according to the rites of different cult associations, in which individuals and groups joined for religious purposes. The Ḥilla association performed the hajj in autumn season while the Ṭuls and Ḥums performed the umrah in spring.

The Ḥums were the Quraysh, Banu Kinanah, Banu Khuza'a and Banu 'Amir. They did not perform the pilgrimage outside the zone of Mecca's haram, thus excluding Mount Arafat. They also developed certain dietary and cultural restrictions. According to Kitab al-Muhabbar, the Ḥilla denoted most of the Banu Tamim, Qays, Rabi`ah, Qūḍa'ah, Ansar, Khath'am, Bajīlah, Banu Bakr ibn Abd Manat, Hudhayl, Asad, Tayy and Bariq. The Ṭuls comprised the tribes of Yemen and Hadramaut, 'Akk, Ujayb and Īyād. The Basl recognised at least eight months of the calendar as holy. There was also another group which did not recognize the sanctity of Mecca's haram or holy months, unlike the other four.

=== Offerings and ritual sacrifice ===
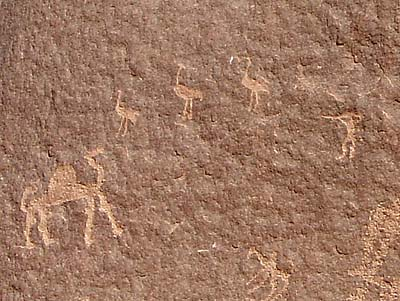
Thamudic petroglyphs from Wadi Rum, depicting a hunter, ibex, a camel and a rider on horseback. Camels were among the sacrificial animals in pre-Islamic Arabia.

The most common offerings were animals, crops, food, liquids, inscribed metal plaques or stone tablets, aromatics, edifices and manufactured objects. Camel-herding Arabs would devote some of their beasts to certain deities. The beasts would have their ears slit and would be left to pasture without a herdsman, allowing them to die a natural death.

Pre-Islamic Arabians, especially pastoralist tribes, sacrificed animals as an offering to a deity. This type of offering was common and involved domestic animals such as camels, sheep and cattle, while game animals and poultry were rarely or never mentioned. Sacrifice rites were not tied to a particular location though they were usually practiced in sacred places. Sacrifice rites could be performed by the devotee, though according to Hoyland, women were probably not allowed. The victim's blood, according to pre-Islamic Arabic poetry and certain South Arabian inscriptions, was also 'poured out' on the altar stone, thus forming a bond between the human and the deity. According to Muslim sources, most sacrifices were concluded with communal feasts.

In South Arabia, beginning with the Christian era, or perhaps a short while before, statuettes were presented before the deity, known as slm (male) or slmt (female). Human sacrifice was sometimes carried out in Arabia. The victims were generally prisoners of war, who represented the god's part of the victory in booty, although other forms might have existed.

Blood sacrifice was definitely practiced in South Arabia, but few allusions to the practice are known, apart from some Minaean inscriptions.

=== Scriptures ===
With the rise of Christianity and Judaism, religious scriptures entered into use in pre-Islamic Arabia, although the available evidence is limited. Nevertheless, with the number of Christians and Jews in this period, it is likely that their scriptures were revered to a degree. The presence of scriptures among existing communities of Christians and Jews, known as the Gospel and the Torah, is described by the Quran. In the early sixth century, six Ethiopic inscriptions were composed during the time of Kaleb of Axum. These inscriptions reveal multiple scriptural quotations, including from the Book of Isaiah, the Psalms, the Gospel of Matthew, and with less certainty, the Book of Genesis. They also mention biblical figures like Jesus, Mary, and David. Another explicit example is the inscription DJE 23, discovered 15 km southeast of the city of Sanaa. This inscription is in Hebrew and was composed during Jewish rule over South Arabia. It is a mishmarot which lists the priestly divisions based on the list given in 1 Chronicles 24. The priestly divisions refer to the way in which the priests were divided in order to organize their service to the Temple in Jerusalem. Ahmad Al-Jallad has argued that the Jabal Dabub inscription, notable for its pre-Islamic variant of the Basmala, bears influences from the Psalms, particularly Psalm 90 and Psalm 123.

The image of a Torah case has been discovered in one of the personal seals (and possibly an inscription) of the Himyarite king Dhu Nuwas. The Book of the Himyarites records multiple uses of scriptures, including citations of it by the Christian community of Najran and in the letters of Simeon of Beth Arsham. The text reports of several martyrs under Dhu Nuwas quoting scripture, such as one directly quoting 1 John 2:4 to him in accusing him of being a liar, and another declares their going to Christ as they approach death using 2 Corinthians 3:8. In one occasion, Dhu Nuwas also swears by the Torah. Jacob of Serugh, a Syriac poet and homilist of the sixth century, wrote a Letter to the Himyarites to the Christian community of South Arabia during these same persecutions, a text that involves detailed discussions of Christology and use of scripture.

=== Other practices ===
In the Hejaz, menstruating women were not allowed to be near the cult images. The area where Isaf and Na'ila's images stood was considered out-of-bounds for menstruating women. This was reportedly the same with Manaf. According to the Book of Idols, this rule applied to all the "idols". This was also the case in South Arabia, as attested in a South Arabian inscription from al-Jawf.

Sexual intercourse in temples was prohibited, as attested in two South Arabian inscriptions. One legend concerning Isaf and Na'ila, when two lovers had sex in the Kaaba and were petrified, joining the idols in the Kaaba, echoes this prohibition.

== By geography ==
=== Eastern Arabia ===
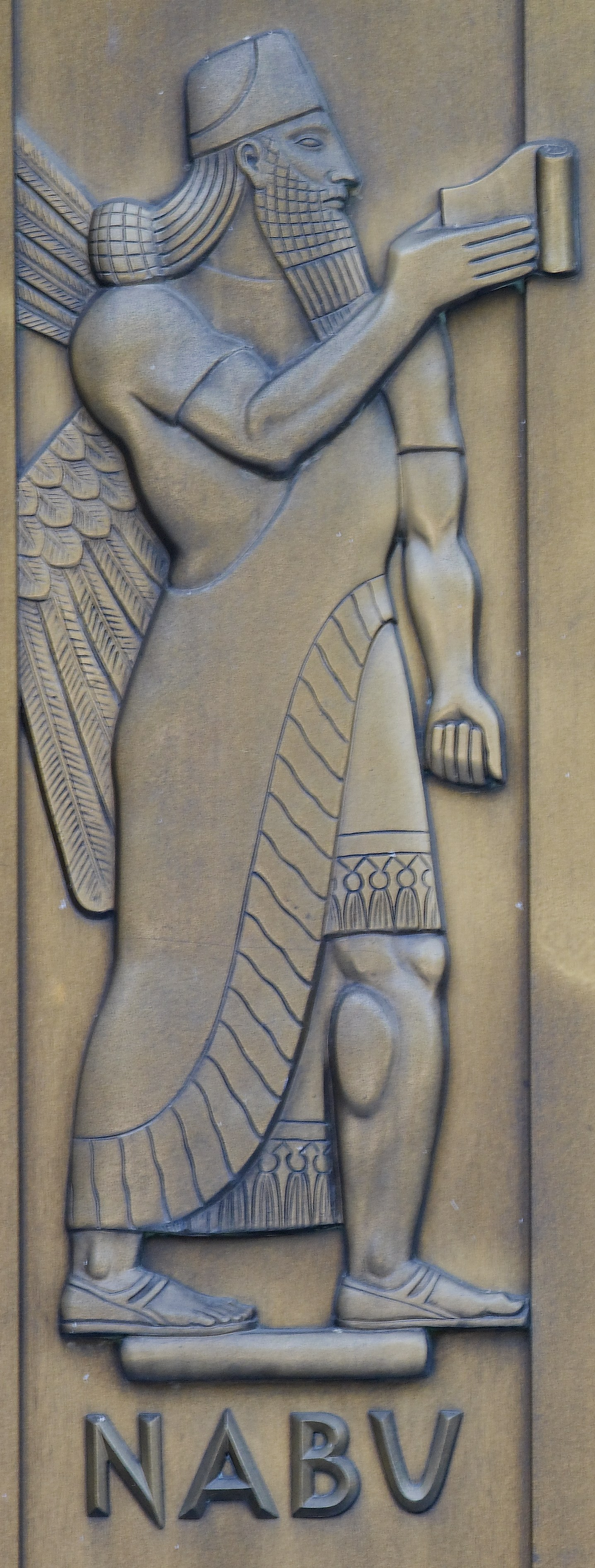
Lee Lawrie, Nabu (1939). Library of Congress John Adams Building, Washington, D.C.

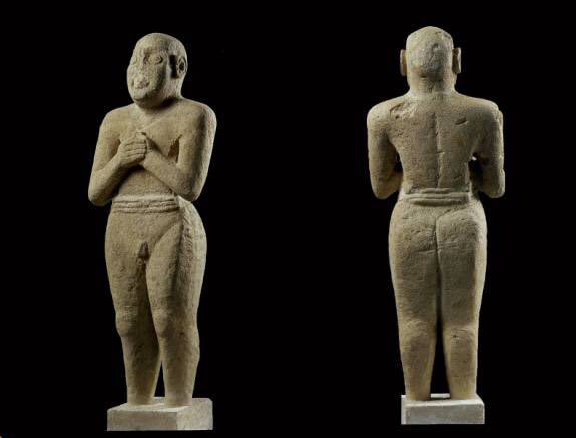
The Worshipping Servant statue from Tarout Island, 2500 BC

The Dilmun civilization, which existed along the Persian Gulf coast and Bahrain until the 6th century BC, worshipped a pair of deities, Inzak and Meskilak. It is not known whether these were the only deities in the pantheon or whether there were others. The discovery of wells at the sites of a Dilmun temple and a shrine suggests that sweet water played an important part in religious practices.

In the subsequent Greco-Roman period, there is evidence that the worship of non-indigenous deities was brought to the region by merchants and visitors. These included Bel, a god popular in the Syrian city of Palmyra, the Mesopotamian deities Nabu and Shamash, the Greek deities Poseidon and Artemis and the west Arabian deities Kahl and Manat.

=== South Arabia ===
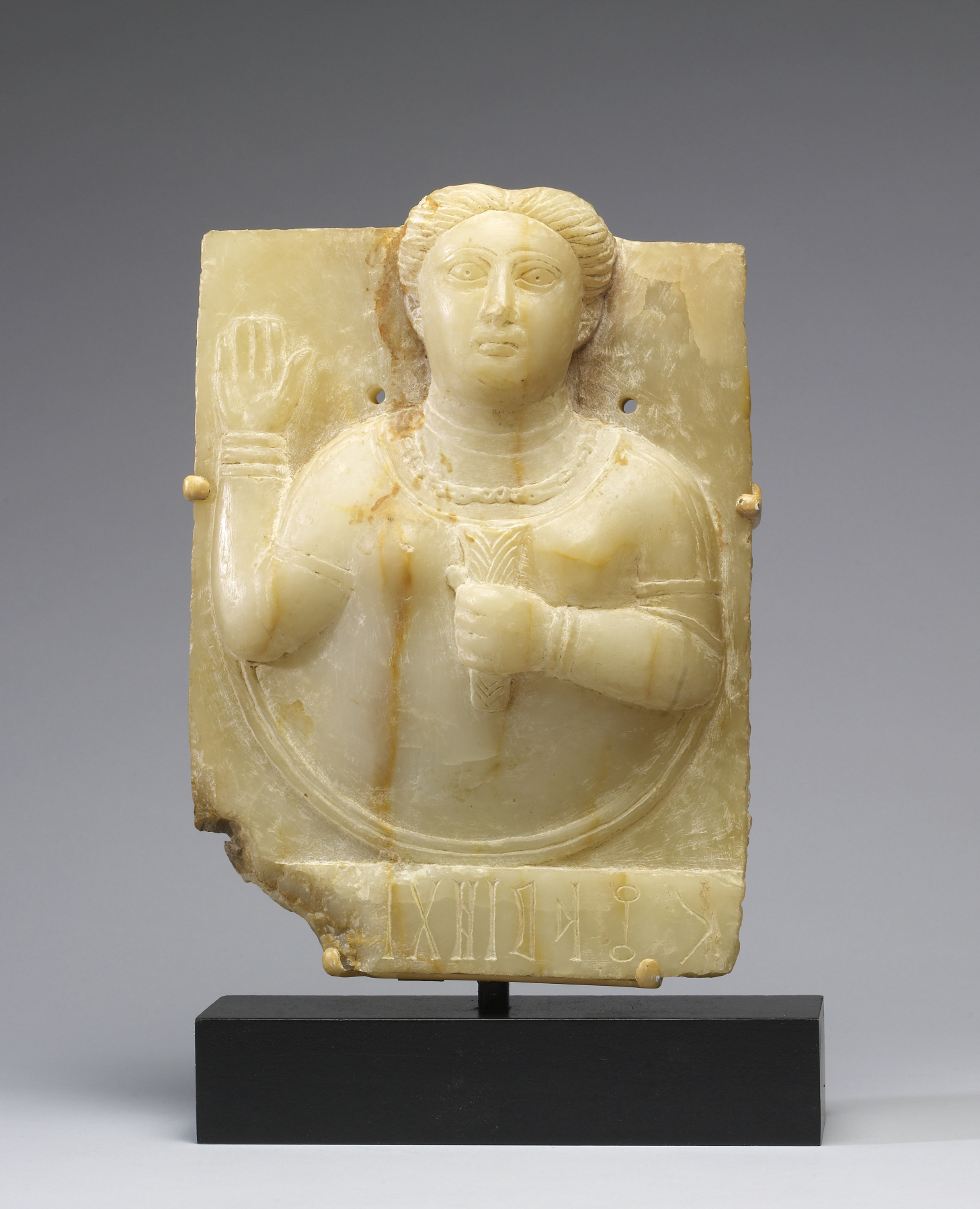
Sculpture of a Sabaean priestess raising her hand to intercede with the sun goddess on behalf of a donor. Probably first century.

The main sources of religious information in pre-Islamic South Arabia are inscriptions, which number in the thousands, as well as the Quran, complemented by archaeological evidence.

The civilizations of South Arabia are considered to have the most developed pantheon in the Arabian peninsula. In South Arabia, the most common god was 'Athtar, who was considered remote. The patron deity (shym) was considered to be of much more immediate significance than 'Athtar. Thus, the kingdom of Saba' had Almaqah, the kingdom of Ma'in had Wadd, the kingdom of Qataban had 'Amm, and the kingdom of Hadhramaut had Sayin. Each people was termed the "children" of their respective patron deity. Patron deities played a vital role in sociopolitical terms, their cults serving as the focus of a person's cohesion and loyalty.

Evidence from surviving inscriptions suggests that each of the southern kingdoms had its own pantheon of three to five deities, the major deity always being a god. For example, the pantheon of Saba comprised Almaqah, the major deity, together with 'Athtar, Haubas, Dhat-Himyam, and Dhat-Badan. The main god in Ma'in and Himyar was 'Athtar, in Qataban it was Amm, and in Hadhramaut it was Sayin. 'Amm was a lunar deity and was associated with the weather, especially lightning. One of the most frequent titles of the god Almaqah was "Lord of Awwam".

Anbay was an oracular god of Qataban and also the spokesman of Amm. His name was invoked in royal regulations regarding water supply. Anbay's name was related to that of the Babylonian deity Nabu. Hawkam was invoked alongside Anbay as god of "command and decision" and his name is derived from the root word "to be wise".

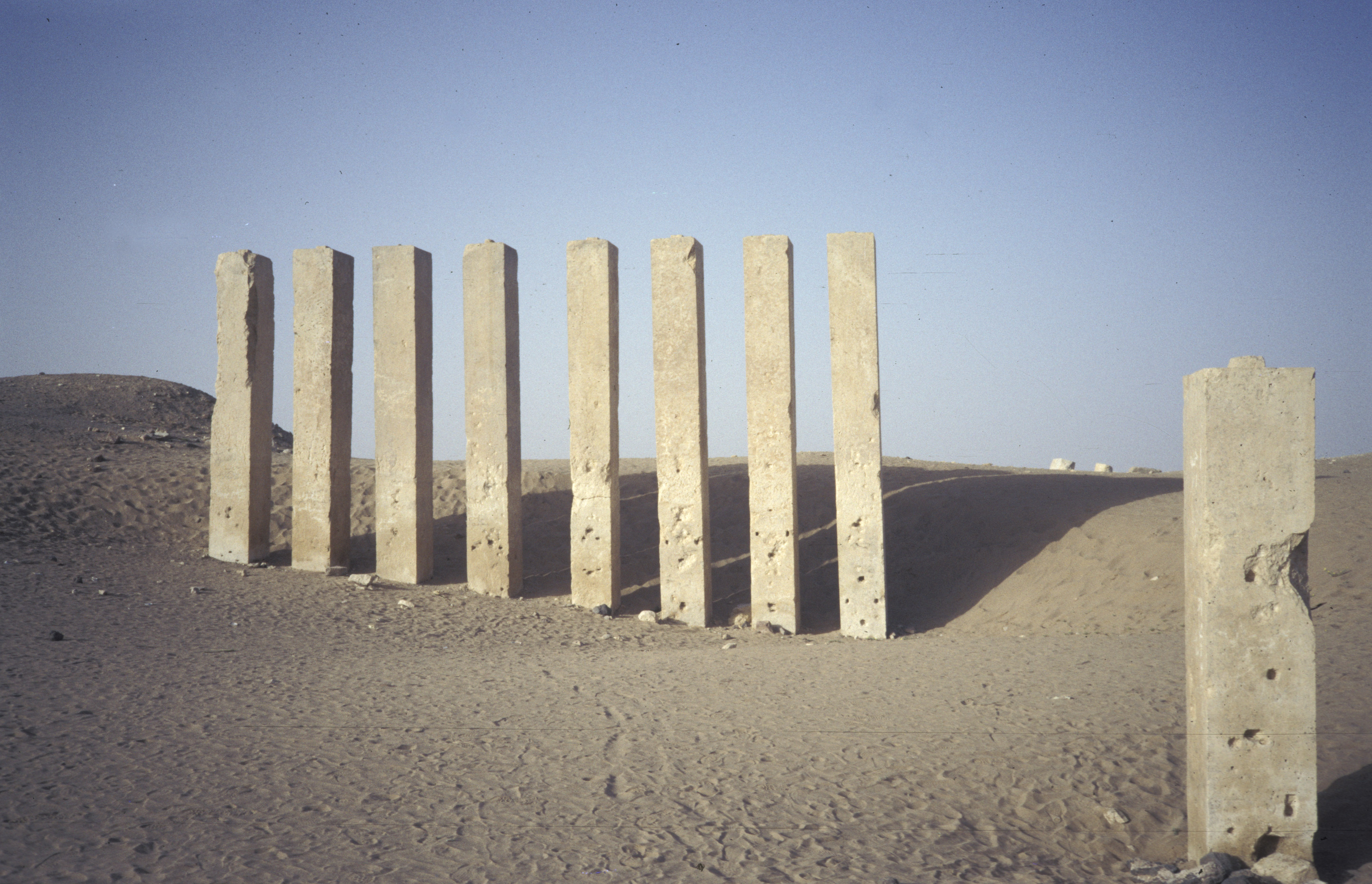
Ruins of temple of Awwam, dedicated to Almaqah.

Each kingdom's central temple was the focus of worship for the main god and would be the destination for an annual pilgrimage, with regional temples dedicated to a local manifestation of the main god. Other beings worshipped included local deities or deities dedicated to specific functions as well as deified ancestors.

==== Influence of Arab tribes ====
The encroachment of northern Arab tribes into South Arabia also introduced northern Arab deities into the region. The three goddesses al-Lat, al-Uzza and Manat became known as Lat/Latan, Uzzayan and Manawt. Uzzayan's cult in particular was widespread in South Arabia, and in Qataban she was invoked as a guardian of the final royal palace. Lat/Latan was not significant in South Arabia, but appears to be popular with the Arab tribes bordering Yemen. Other Arab deities include Dhu-Samawi, a god originally worshipped by the Amir tribe, and Kahilan, perhaps related to Kahl of Qaryat al-Faw.

Bordering Yemen, the Azd Sârat tribe of the Asir region was said to have worshipped Dhu'l-Shara, Dhu'l-Kaffayn, Dhu'l-Khalasa and A'im. According to the Book of Idols, Dhu'l-Kaffayn originated from a clan of the Banu Daws. In addition to being worshipped among the Azd, Dushara is also reported to have a shrine amongst the Daws. Dhu’l-Khalasa was an oracular god and was also worshipped by the Bajila and Khatham tribes.

==== Influence on Aksum ====
Before conversion to Christianity, the Aksumites followed a polytheistic religion that was similar to that of Southern Arabia. The lunar god Hawbas was worshiped in South Arabia and Aksum. The god Astar, a sky-deity was related to that of 'Attar, was also worshipped in Aksum. The god Almaqah was worshiped at Hawulti-Melazo. The South Arabian gods in Aksum included Dhat-Himyam and Dhat-Ba'adan. A stone later reused for the church of Enda-Cerqos at Melazo mentions these gods. Hawbas is also mentioned on an altar and sphinx in Dibdib. The name of Nrw who is mentioned in Aksum inscriptions is related to that of the South Arabian god Nawraw, a deity of stars.

==== Transition to Judaism ====
The Himyarite kings radically opposed polytheism in favor of Judaism, beginning officially in 380. The last trace of polytheism in South Arabia, an inscription commemorating a construction project with a polytheistic invocation, and another, mentioning the temple of Ta’lab, all date from just after 380 (the former dating to the rule of the king Dhara’amar Ayman, and the latter dating to the year 401–402). The rejection of polytheism from the public sphere did not mean the extinction of it altogether, as polytheism likely continued in the private sphere.

=== Central Arabia ===
The Kinda tribe's chief god was Kahl, whom their capital Qaryat Dhat Kahl (modern Qaryat al-Faw) was named for. His name appears in the form of many inscriptions and rock engravings on the slopes of the Tuwayq, on the walls of the souk of the village, in the residential houses and on the incense burners. An inscription in Qaryat Dhat Kahl invokes the gods Kahl, Athtar al-Shariq and Lah.

=== Hejaz ===
According to Islamic sources, the Hejaz region was home to three important shrines dedicated to al-Lat, al-’Uzza and Manat. The shrine and idol of al-Lat, according to the Book of Idols, once stood in Ta'if, and was primarily worshipped by the Banu Thaqif tribe. Al-’Uzza's principal shrine was in Nakhla and she was the chief-goddess of the Quraysh tribe. Manāt's idol, reportedly the oldest of the three, was erected on the seashore between Medina and Mecca, and was honored by the Aws and Khazraj tribes. Inhabitants of several areas venerated Manāt, performing sacrifices before her idol, and pilgrimages of some were not considered completed until they visited Manāt and shaved their heads.

In the Muzdalifah region near Mecca, the god Quzah, who is a god of rains and storms, was worshipped. In pre-Islamic times pilgrims used to halt at the "hill of Quzah" before sunrise. Qusai ibn Kilab is traditionally reported to have introduced the association of fire worship with him on Muzdalifah.

Various other deities were venerated in the area by specific tribes, such as the god Suwa' by the Banu Hudhayl tribe and the god Nuhm by the Muzaynah tribe.

==== Historiography ====
The majority of extant information about Mecca during the rise of Islam and earlier times comes from the text of the Quran itself and later Muslim sources such as the prophetic biography literature dealing with the life of Muhammad and the Book of Idols. Alternative sources are so fragmentary and specialized that writing a convincing history of this period based on them alone is impossible. Several scholars hold that the sīra literature is not independent of the Quran but has been fabricated to explain the verses of the Quran. There is evidence to support the contention that some reports of the sīras are of dubious validity, but there is also evidence to support the contention that the sīra narratives originated independently of the Quran. Compounding the problem is that the earliest extant Muslim historical works, including the sīras, were composed in their definitive form more than a century after the beginning of the Islamic era. Some of these works were based on subsequently lost earlier texts, which in their turn recorded a fluid oral tradition. Scholars do not agree as to the time when such oral accounts began to be systematically collected and written down, and they differ greatly in their assessment of the historical reliability of the available texts.

==== Role of Mecca and the Kaaba ====
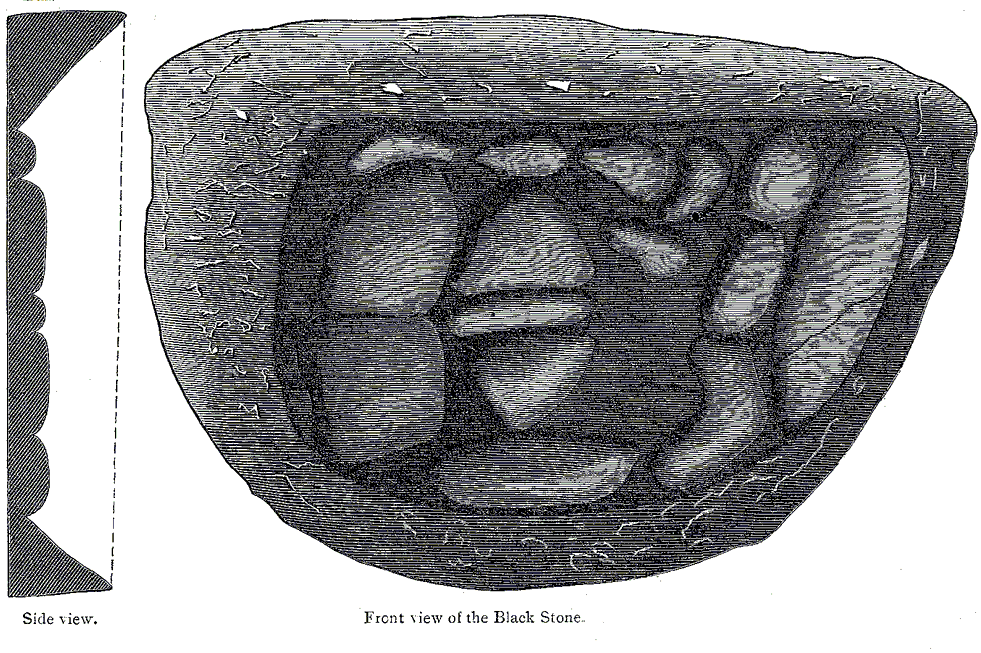
A drawing of the Kaaba's black stone in fragmented form, front and side illustrations

The Kaaba, whose environs were regarded as sacred, became a national shrine under the custodianship of the Quraysh, the chief tribe of Mecca, which made the Hejaz the most important religious area in north Arabia. Its role was solidified by a confrontation with the Christian king Abraha, who controlled much of Arabia from a seat of power in Yemen in the middle of the sixth century. Abraha had recently constructed a splendid church in Sanaa, and he wanted to make that city a major centre of pilgrimage, but Mecca's Kaaba presented a challenge to his plan. Abraha found a pretext for an attack on Mecca, presented by different sources alternatively as pollution of the church by a tribe allied to the Meccans or as an attack on Abraha's grandson in Najran by a Meccan party. The defeat of the army he assembled to conquer Mecca is recounted in detail by the Islamic tradition and is also alluded to in the Quran and pre-Islamic poetry. After the battle, which probably occurred around 565, the Quraysh became a dominant force in western Arabia, receiving the title "God's people" (ahl Allah) according to Islamic sources, and formed the cult association of ḥums, which tied members of many tribes in western Arabia to the Kaaba.

==== The Kaaba, Allah, and Hubal ====
According to tradition, the Kaaba was a cube-like, originally roofless structure housing a black stone revered as a relic, resembling other Arabian Kaabas reported in tradition, such as the Kaaba of Najran. The sanctuary was dedicated to Hubal (Arabic: هبل), who, according to some sources, was worshiped as the greatest of the 360 idols the Kaaba contained, which probably represented the days of the year. Ibn Ishaq and Ibn Al-Kalbi both report that the human-shaped idol of Hubal made of precious stone (agate, according to the Book of Idols) came into the possession of the Quraysh with its right hand broken off and that the Quraysh made a hand of gold to replace it. A soothsayer performed divination in the shrine by drawing ritual arrows, and vows and sacrifices were made to assure success. Marshall Hodgson argues that relations with deities and fetishes in pre-Islamic Mecca were maintained chiefly on the basis of bargaining, where favors were expected in return for offerings. A deity's or oracle's failure to provide the desired response was sometimes met with anger.

Different theories have been proposed regarding the role of Allah in Meccan religion. According to one hypothesis, which goes back to Julius Wellhausen, Allah (the supreme deity of the tribal federation around Quraysh) was a designation that consecrated the superiority of Hubal (the supreme deity of Quraysh) over the other gods. However, there is also evidence that Allah and Hubal were two distinct deities. According to that hypothesis, the Kaaba was first consecrated to a supreme deity named Allah and then hosted the pantheon of Quraysh after their conquest of Mecca, about a century before the time of Muhammad. Some inscriptions seem to indicate the use of Allah as a name of a polytheist deity centuries earlier, but we know nothing precise about this use. Some scholars have suggested that Allah may have represented a remote creator god who was gradually eclipsed by more particularized local deities. There is disagreement on whether Allah played a major role in the Meccan religious cult. No iconic representation or idol of Allah is known to have existed.

==== Other deities ====
The three chief goddesses of Meccan religion were al-Lat, Al-‘Uzzá, and Manāt, who were called the daughters of Allah. Egerton Sykes meanwhile states that Al-lāt was the female counterpart of Allah while Uzza was a name given by Banu Ghatafan to the planet Venus.

Other deities of the Quraysh in Mecca included Manaf, Isaf and Na’ila. Although the early Arab historian Al-Tabari calls Manaf (Arabic: مناف) "one of the greatest deities of Mecca", very little information is available about it. Women touched his idol as a token of blessing, and kept away from it during menstruation. Gonzague Ryckmans described this as a practice peculiar to Manaf, but according to the Encyclopedia of Islam, a report from Ibn Al-Kalbi indicates that it was common to all idols. Muhammad's great-great-grandfather's name was Abd Manaf which means "slave of Manaf". He is thought by some scholars to be a sun-god. The idols of Isāf and Nā'ila were located near the Black Stone with a talbiyah performed to Isāf during sacrifices. Various legends existed about the idols, including one that they were petrified after they committed adultery in the Kaaba.

The pantheon of the Quraysh was not identical with that of the tribes who entered into various cult and commercial associations with them, especially that of the hums. Christian Julien Robin argues that the former was composed principally of idols that were in the sanctuary of Mecca, including Hubal and Manaf, while the pantheon of the associations was superimposed on it, and its principal deities included the three goddesses, who had neither idols nor a shrine in that city.

==== Political and religious developments ====
The second half of the sixth century was a period of political disorder in Arabia and communication routes were no longer secure. Religious divisions were an important cause of the crisis. Judaism became the dominant religion in Yemen while Christianity took root in the Persian Gulf area. In line with the broader trends of the ancient world, Arabia yearned for a more spiritual form of religion and began believing in afterlife, while the choice of religion increasingly became a personal rather than communal choice. While many were reluctant to convert to a foreign faith, those faiths provided intellectual and spiritual reference points, and the old pagan vocabulary of Arabic began to be replaced by Jewish and Christian loanwords from Aramaic everywhere, including Mecca. The distribution of pagan temples supports Gerald Hawting's argument that Arabian polytheism was marginalized in the region and already dying in Mecca on the eve of Islam. The practice of polytheistic cults was increasingly limited to the steppe and the desert, and in Yathrib (later known as Medina), which included two tribes with polytheistic majorities, the absence of a public pagan temple in the town or its immediate neighborhood indicates that polytheism was confined to the private sphere. Looking at the text of the Quran itself, Hawting has also argued that the criticism of idolaters and polytheists contained in Quran is in fact a hyperbolic reference to other monotheists, in particular the Arab Jews and Arab Christians, whose religious beliefs were considered imperfect. According to some traditions, the Kaaba contained no statues, but its interior was decorated with images of Mary and Jesus, prophets, angels, and trees.

To counter the effects of anarchy, the institution of sacred months, during which every act of violence was prohibited, was reestablished. During those months, it was possible to participate in pilgrimages and fairs without danger. The Quraysh upheld the principle of two annual truces, one of one month and the second of three months, which conferred a sacred character to the Meccan sanctuary. The cult association of hums, in which individuals and groups partook in the same rites, was primarily religious, but it also had important economic consequences. Although, as Patricia Crone has shown, Mecca could not compare with the great centres of caravan trade on the eve of Islam, it was probably one of the most prosperous and secure cities of the peninsula, since, unlike many of them, it did not have surrounding walls. Pilgrimage to Mecca was a popular custom. Some Islamic rituals, including processions around the Kaaba and between the hills of al-Safa and Marwa, as well as the salutation "we are here, O Allah, we are here" repeated on approaching the Kaaba are believed to have antedated Islam. Spring water acquired a sacred character in Arabia early on and Islamic sources state that the well of Zamzam became holy long before the Islamic era.

==== Advent of Islam ====
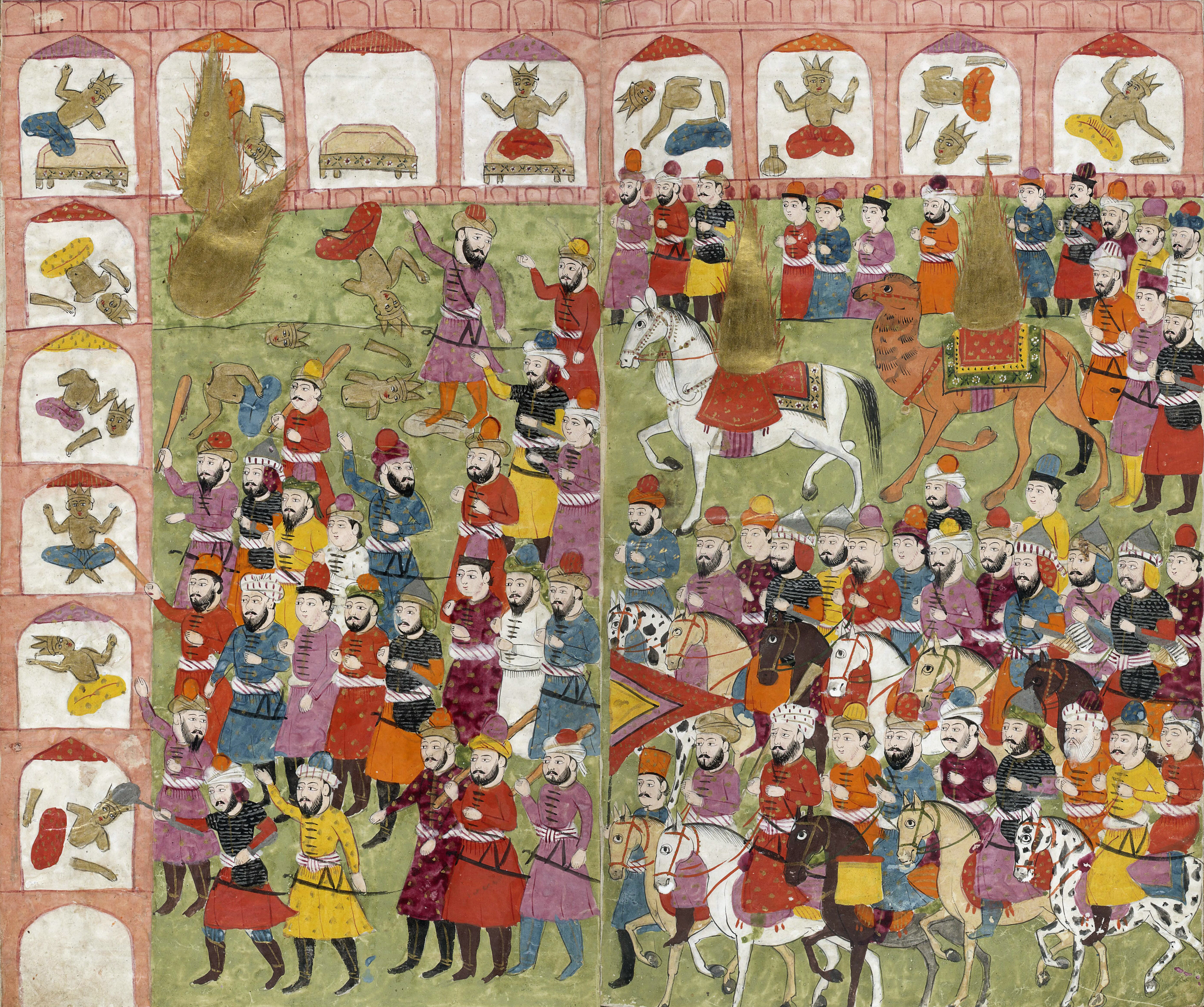
Persian miniature depicting the destruction of idols during the conquest of Mecca; here Muhammad is represented as a flame.

According to Ibn Sa'd, the opposition in Mecca started when the prophet of Islam, Muhammad, delivered verses that "spoke shamefully of the idols they (the Meccans) worshiped other than Himself (God) and mentioned the perdition of their fathers who died in disbelief". According to William Montgomery Watt, as the ranks of Muhammad's followers swelled, he became a threat to the local tribes and the rulers of the city, whose wealth rested upon the Kaaba, the focal point of Meccan religious life, which Muhammad threatened to overthrow. Muhammad's denunciation of the Meccan traditional religion was especially offensive to his own tribe, the Quraysh, as they were the guardians of the Kaaba.

The conquest of Mecca around 629–630 AD led to the destruction of the idols around the Kaaba, including Hubal. Following the conquest, shrines and temples dedicated to deities were destroyed, such as the shrines to al-Lat, al-’Uzza and Manat in Ta’if, Nakhla and al-Qudayd respectively.

=== North Arabia ===
Less complex societies outside South Arabia often had smaller pantheons, with the patron deity having much prominence. The deities attested in north Arabian inscriptions include Ruda, Nuha, Allah, Dathan, and Kahl. Inscriptions in a North Arabian dialect in the region of Najd referring to Nuha describe emotions as a gift from him. In addition, they also refer to Ruda being responsible for all things good and bad.

The Safaitic tribes in particular prominently worshipped the goddess al-Lat as a bringer of prosperity. The Syrian god Baalshamin was also worshipped by Safaitic tribes and is mentioned in Safaitic inscriptions.

Religious worship amongst the Qedarites, an ancient tribal confederation that was probably subsumed into Nabataea around the 2nd century AD, was centred on a polytheistic system in which women rose to prominence. Divine images of the gods and goddesses worshipped by Qedarite Arabs, as noted in Assyrian inscriptions, included representations of Atarsamain, Nuha, Ruda, Dai, Abirillu and Atarquruma. The female guardian of these idols, usually the reigning queen, served as a priestess (apkallatu, in Assyrian texts) who communed with the other world. There is also evidence that the Qedar worshipped al-Lat to whom the inscription on a silver bowl from a king of Qedar is dedicated. In the Babylonian Talmud, which was passed down orally for centuries before being transcribed c. 500 AD, in tractate Taanis (folio 5b), it is said that most Qedarites worshiped pagan gods.

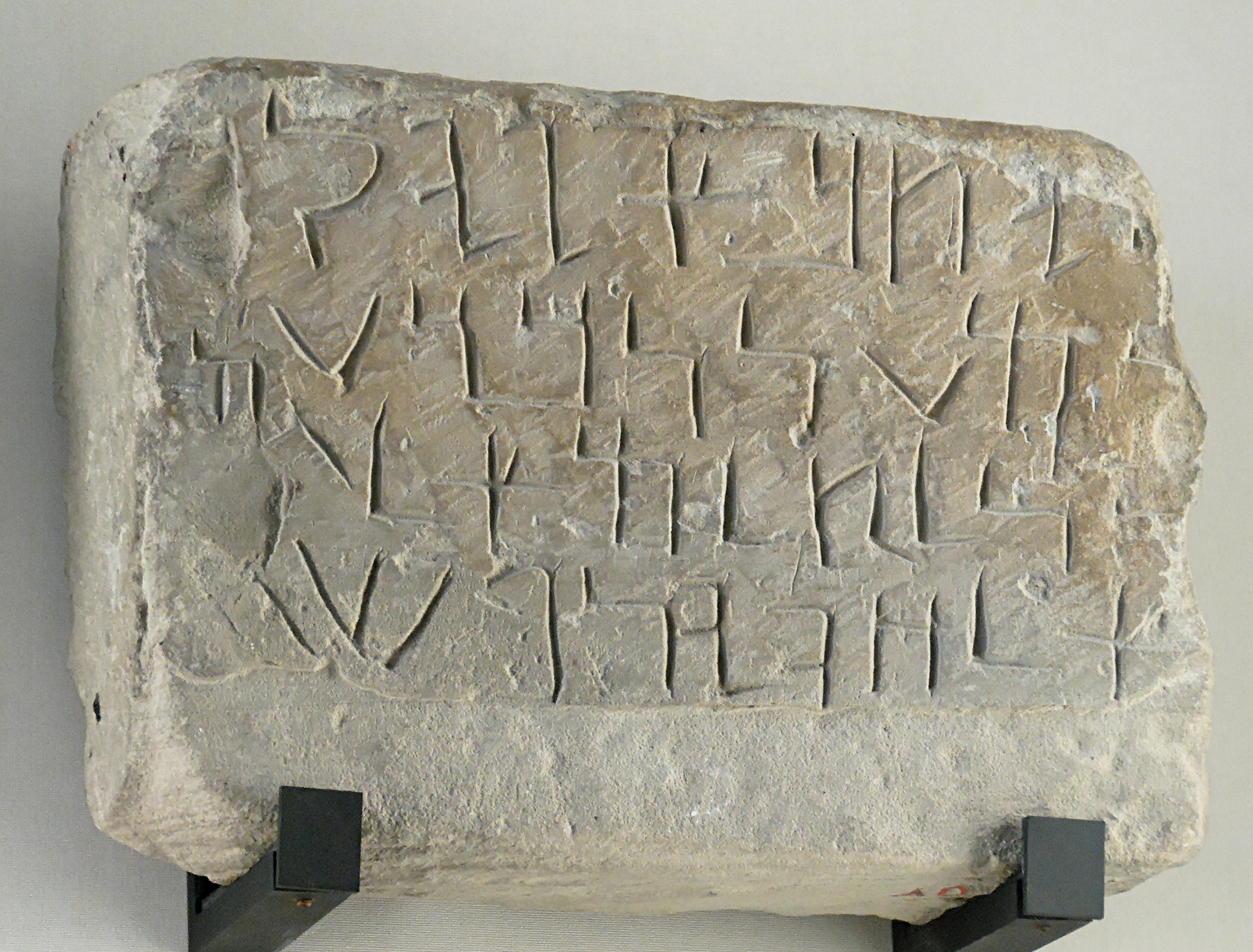
Aramaic stele inscription of Tayma dedicated to the god Salm

The Aramaic stele inscription discovered by Charles Hubert in 1880 at Tayma mentions the introduction of a new god called Salm of hgm into the city's pantheon being permitted by three local gods – Salm of Mahram who was the chief god, Shingala, and Ashira. The name Salm means "image" or "idol".

The Midianites, a people referred to in the Book of Genesis and located in north-western Arabia, may have worshipped Yahweh. An Egyptian temple of Hathor continued to be used during the Midianite occupation of the site, although images of Hathor were defaced suggesting Midianite opposition. They transformed it into a desert tent-shrine set up with a copper sculpture of a snake.

The Lihyanites worshipped the god Dhu-Ghabat and rarely turned to others for their needs. Dhu-Ghabat's name means "he of the thicket", based on the etymology of gabah, meaning forest or thicket. The god al-Kutba', a god of writing probably related to a Babylonian deity and perhaps was brought into the region by the Babylonian king Nabonidus, is mentioned in Lihyanite inscriptions as well. The worship of the Hermonian gods Leucothea and Theandrios was spread from Phoenicia to Arabia.

According to the Book of Idols, the Tayy tribe worshipped al-Fals, whose idol stood on Jabal Aja, while the Kalb tribe worshipped Wadd, who had an idol in Dumat al-Jandal.

==== Nabataeans ====
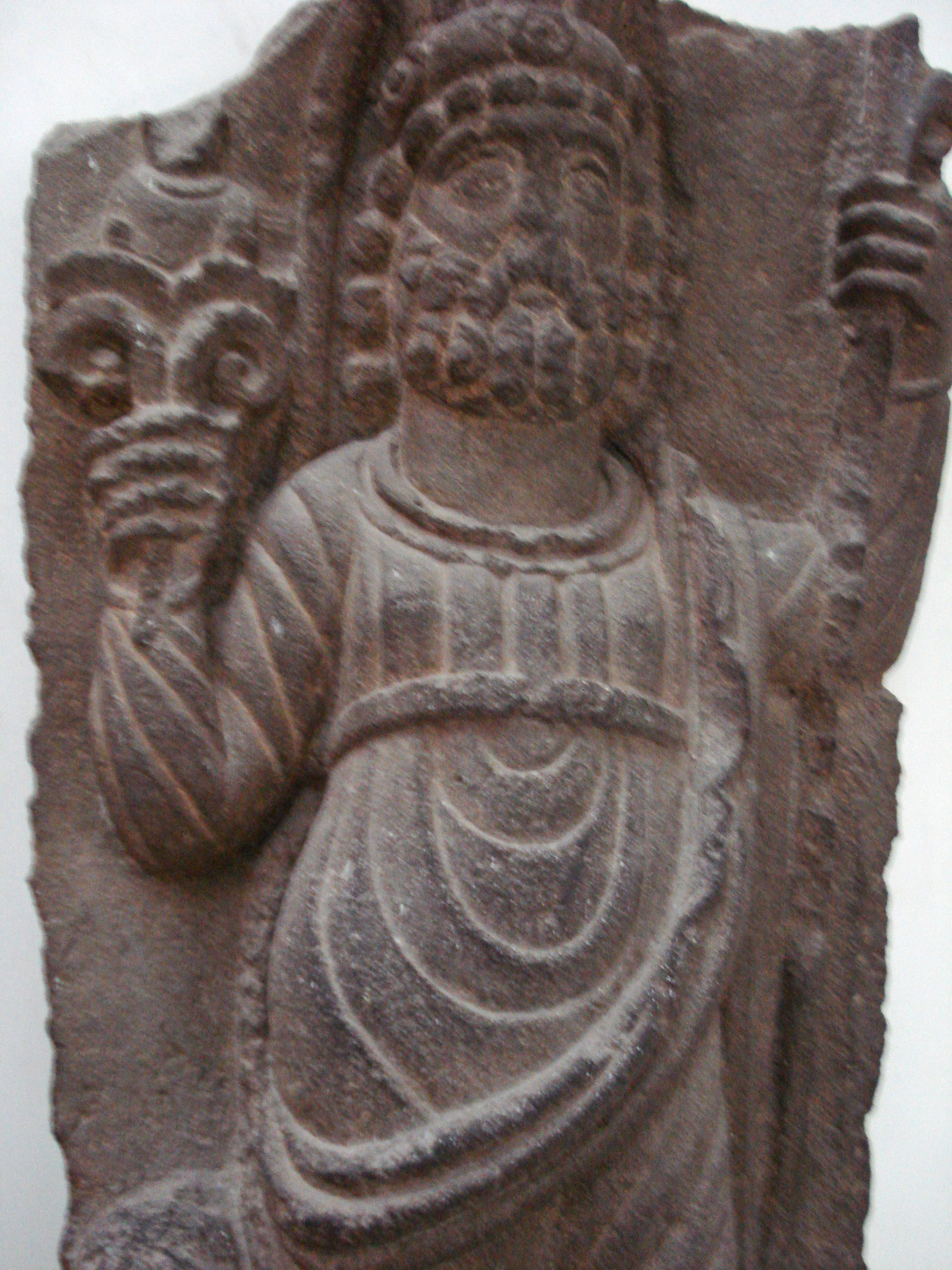
Relief of Dushara, National Museum of Damascus

The Nabataeans worshipped primarily northern Arabian deities. Under foreign influences, they also incorporated foreign deities and elements into their beliefs.

The Nabataeans' chief-god is Dushara. In Petra, the only major goddess is Al-‘Uzzá, assuming the traits of Isis, Tyche and Aphrodite. It is unknown if her worship and identity is related to her cult at Nakhla and others. The Nabatean inscriptions define Allāt and Al-Uzza as the "bride of Dushara". Al-Uzza may have been an epithet of Allāt in the Nabataean religion according to John F. Healey.

Outside Petra, other deities were worshipped; for example, Hubal and Manat were invoked in the Hejaz, and al-Lat was invoked in the Hauran and the Syrian desert. The Nabataean king Obodas I, who founded Obodat, was deified and worshipped as a god. They also worshipped Shay al-Qawm, al-Kutba', and various Greco-Roman deities such as Nike and Tyche. Maxime Rodinson suggests that Hubal, who was popular in Mecca, had a Nabataean origin.

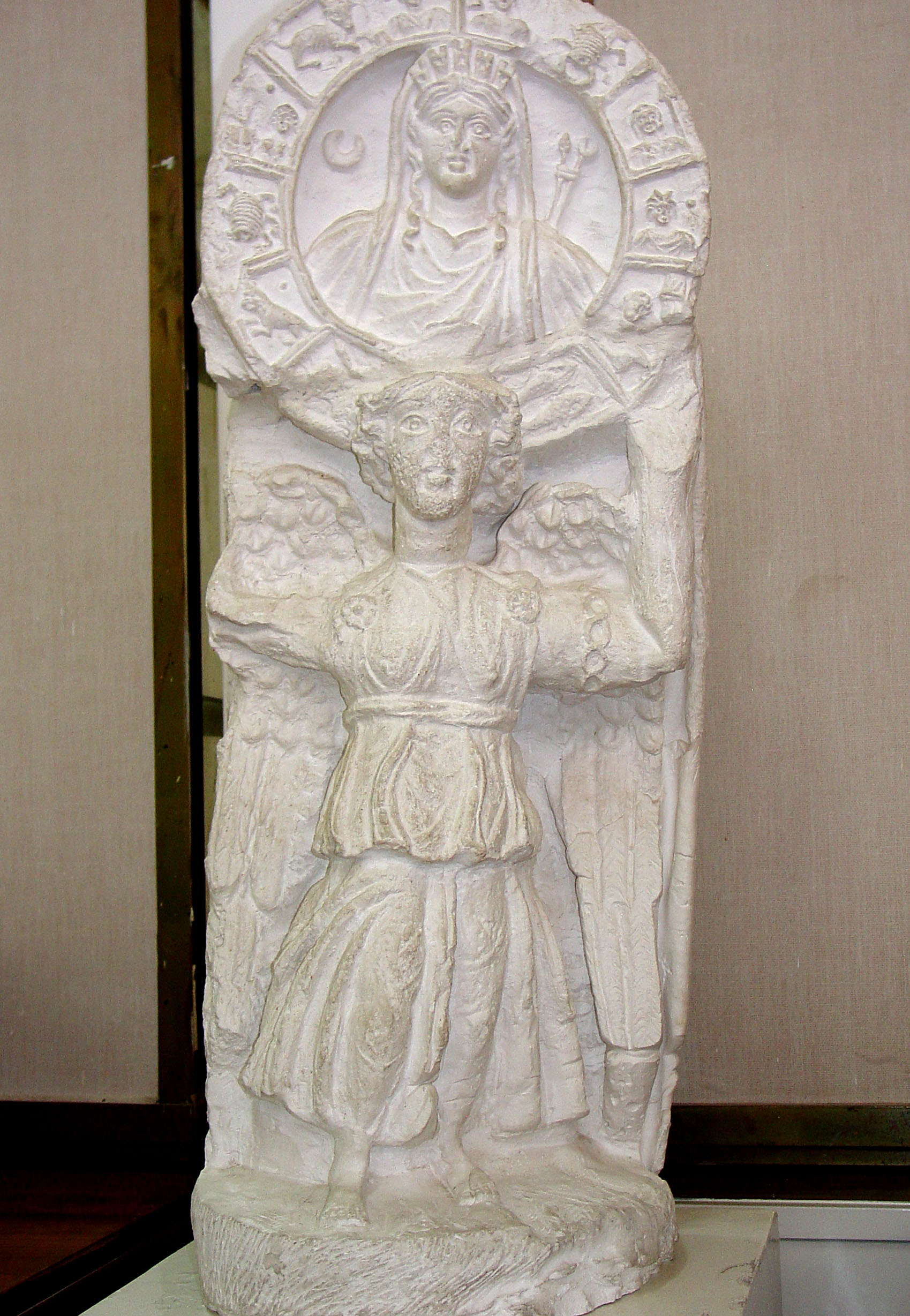
Nike holding up a bust of Atargatis, crowned as Tyche and encircled by the signs of the zodiac. Amman Museum copy of Nabataean statue, 100 AD.

The worship of Pakidas, a Nabataean god, is attested at Gerasa alongside Hera in an inscription dated to the first century A.D. while an Arabian god is also attested by three inscriptions dated to the second century.

The Nabataeans were known for their elaborate tombs, but they were not just for show; they were meant to be comfortable places for the dead. Petra has many "sacred high places" which include altars that have usually been interpreted as places of human sacrifice, although, since the 1960s, an alternative theory that they are "exposure platforms" for placing the corpses of the deceased as part of a funerary ritual has been put forward. However, there is, in fact, little evidence for either proposition.

==== Religious beliefs of Arabs outside Arabia ====
Palmyra was a cosmopolitan society, with its population being a mix of Aramaeans and Arabs. The Arabs of Palmyra worshipped al-Lat, Rahim and Shamash. The temple of al-Lat was established by the Bene Ma'zin tribe, who were probably an Arab tribe. The nomads of the countryside worshipped a set of deities, bearing Arab names and attributes, most prominent of them was Abgal, who himself is not attested in Palmyra itself. Ma'n, an Arab god, was worshipped alongside Abgal in a temple dedicated in 195 AD at Khirbet Semrin in the Palmyrene region while an inscription dated 194 AD at Ras esh-Shaar calls him the "good and bountiful god". A stele at Ras esh-Shaar shows him riding a horse with a lance while the god Saad is riding a camel. Abgal, Ma'n and Sa'd were known as the genii.

The god Ashar was represented on a stele in Dura-Europos alongside another god Sa'd. The former was represented on a horse with Arab dress while the other was shown standing on the ground. Both had Parthian hairstyle, large facial hair and moustaches as well as similar clothing. Ashar's name is found to have been used in a theophoric manner among the Arab-majority areas of the region of the Northwest Semitic languages, like Hatra, where names like "Refuge of Ashar", "Servant of Ashar" and "Ashar has given" are recorded on an inscription.

In Edessa, the solar deity was the primary god around the time of the Roman Emperor Julian and this worship was presumably brought in by migrants from Arabia. Julian's oration delivered to the denizens of the city mentioned that they worshipped the Sun surrounded by Azizos and Monimos whom Iamblichus identified with Ares and Hermes respectively. Monimos derived from Mu'nim or "the favourable one", and was another name of Ruda or Ruldaiu as apparent from spellings of his name in Sennacherib's Annals.

The idol of the god al-Uqaysir was, according to the Book of Idols, located in Syria, and was worshipped by the tribes of Quda'a, Lakhm, Judham, Amela, and Ghatafan. Adherents would go on a pilgrimage to the idol and shave their heads, then mix their hair with wheat, "for every single hair a handful of wheat".

A shrine to Dushara has been discovered in the harbour of ancient Puteoli in Italy, together with the Puteoli Nabataean inscriptions. The city was an important nexus for trade to the Near East, and it is known to have had a Nabataean presence during the mid 1st century BCE. A Minaean altar dedicated to Wadd evidently existed in Delos, containing two inscriptions in Minaean and Greek respectively.

=== Bedouin religious beliefs ===
The Bedouin were introduced to Meccan ritualistic practices as they frequented settled towns of the Hejaz during the four months of the "holy truce", the first three of which were devoted to religious observance, while the fourth was set aside for trade. Alan Jones infers from Bedouin poetry that the gods, even Allah, were less important to the Bedouins than Fate. They seem to have had little trust in rituals and pilgrimages as means of propitiating Fate, but had recourse to divination and soothsayers (kahins). The Bedouins regarded some trees, wells, caves and stones as sacred objects, either as fetishes or as means of reaching a deity. They created sanctuaries where people could worship fetishes.

The Bedouins had a code of honor which Fazlur Rahman Malik states may be regarded as their religious ethics. This code encompassed women, bravery, hospitality, honouring one's promises and pacts, and vengeance. They believed that the ghost of a slain person would cry out from the grave until their thirst for blood was quenched. Practices such as killing of infant girls were often regarded as having religious sanction. Numerous mentions of jinn in the Quran and testimony of both pre-Islamic and Islamic literature indicate that the belief in spirits was prominent in pre-Islamic Bedouin religion.

However, there is evidence that the word jinn is derived from Aramaic, ginnaye, which was widely attested in Palmyrene inscriptions. The Aramaic word was used by Christians to designate pagan gods reduced to the status of demons, and was introduced into Arabic folklore only late in the pre-Islamic era. Julius Wellhausen has observed that such spirits were thought to inhabit desolate, dingy and dark places and that they were feared. One had to protect oneself from them, but they were not the objects of a true cult.

Bedouin religious experience also included an apparently indigenous cult of ancestors. The dead were not regarded as powerful, but rather as deprived of protection and needing charity of the living as a continuation of social obligations beyond the grave. Only certain ancestors, especially heroes from which the tribe was said to derive its name, seem to have been objects of real veneration.

== See also ==
- Ancient Semitic religion
- Ancient Canaanite religion
- Hanif
- List of pre-Islamic Arabian deities
- Religions of the ancient Near East
- Rahmanan
- Shirk (Islam)
- Taghut
