= Dumaitic =

Ancient North Arabian script

The Dumaitic script constitutes a discrete and highly specialized variety of the Ancient North Arabian (ANA) alphabetic family, the local writing tradition of the oasis and ancient city of Dūmat al-Jandal in the al-Jawf Province of northern Saudi Arabia.

Dumaitic was used in the first millennium BCE and provides evidence for sedentary literacy in the northern oases before the late antique transition to the use of the Arabic script. Historically, only three Dumaitic inscriptions were known: WTI 21, WTI 22, and WTI 23 (or WDum 1–3). A new survey in the region led to the identification and publication of another sixteen Dumaitic inscriptions in 2018.

Dumaitic was first discovered and documented by Frederick V. Winnett and William L. Reed during a 1962 expedition, with the findings published in 1970. Originally, they named the script "Jawfian". In 2000, Michael C. A. Macdonald re-analyzed the script, and re-named it "Dumaitic" to reflect its connection to the Duma oasis.

== Geography ==
Located roughly 50 km southwest of Sakākā, the expansive oasis of Dūmat al-Jandal sits within a prominent depression known as a jawf. Identified as Adummatu in ancient Akkadian records, this site marks the southern-most point of the Wādī Sirḥān corridor. Its natural boundaries consist of the limestone plateau of the ḥamād to the north and the vast Nafūd desert to the south. Beyond its reliable water resources, the primary significance of the location is its position at a major geographical crossroads. By serving as an intersection for multiple caravan routes, the oasis functioned as a vital link between the Arabian Peninsula, Mesopotamia, and the Levant. This strategic placement explains why it remained a major power center for various groups including the Qedarite Arabs, the Nabataeans, and the Romans.

== Main inscriptions ==
The three core inscriptions of the Dumaitic script (WDI 21–23 or WDum 1–3), representing all known Dumaitic inscriptions until 2018, read:

WTI 21 (WDum 1): h rḍw s¹ʾlt klb bz / 'O Rḍw, the petition of Klb is here'

WTI 22 (WDum 2): h rḍw wdd ʿw{ṣ} ʿw{ḏ} ʿh / 'O Rḍw, let there be love, ʿw{ṣ} ʿw{ḏ} ʿh (?)'

WTI 23 (WDum 3): h rḍw w nhy / w ʿtrs¹m / s¹ʿd-n ʿl-wdd-y / 'O Rḍw, and Nhy / and ʿtrs¹m / help me in the matter of my love

All three inscriptions begin include a short petition to the god Ruday. The first, WTI 21, was authored by Klb (Kalb), a common Semitic personal name, literally meaning "dog". The scripts reflect standardized formula for personal prayer within the oasis culture. WTI 22 represents a different genre of graffito, focusing on social or personal relationships, using the common verb wdd ("to love" or "to have affection for") from the broader North Arabian epigraphic tradition. The third inscription, WTI 23, is the most linguistically and religiously significant of the three texts, as it invokes a triad of deities: "O Ruḍay and Nuhay and Atarsamain, help me in the matter of my love". The three deities are also known from a larger list of six deities of a list collected by the Assyrian king Sennacherib of the same region; the other three, Daya, Abirillu, and Atarqurama, are not attested in any Arabian inscriptions.

== Language ==
Dumaitic
- Jawfian
- Native to: Qedar
- Region: Dumat al-Jandal
- Ethnicity: Qedarites
- Era: 8th-7th centuries BC
- Language family: Afroasiatic: Semitic; West Semitic; Central Semitic; North Arabian; Ancient North Arabian; Dumaitic
- Writing system: Ancient North Arabian

Language codes
- ISO 639-3: None (mis)
- Glottolog: duma1255

The Dumaitic language is poorly known. It is a part of the oasis Ancient North Arabian languages, being spoken in Dumat al-Jandal.

== See also ==
- Archaeology of the Arabian Peninsula
- Jabal Dabub inscription
- Paleo-Arabic
- Prehistoric Arabia
- Qatrayith
