= Shams (deity) =

Sun goddess in Arabian mythology

- Patron goddess of Himyarite Kingdom; Sun goddess
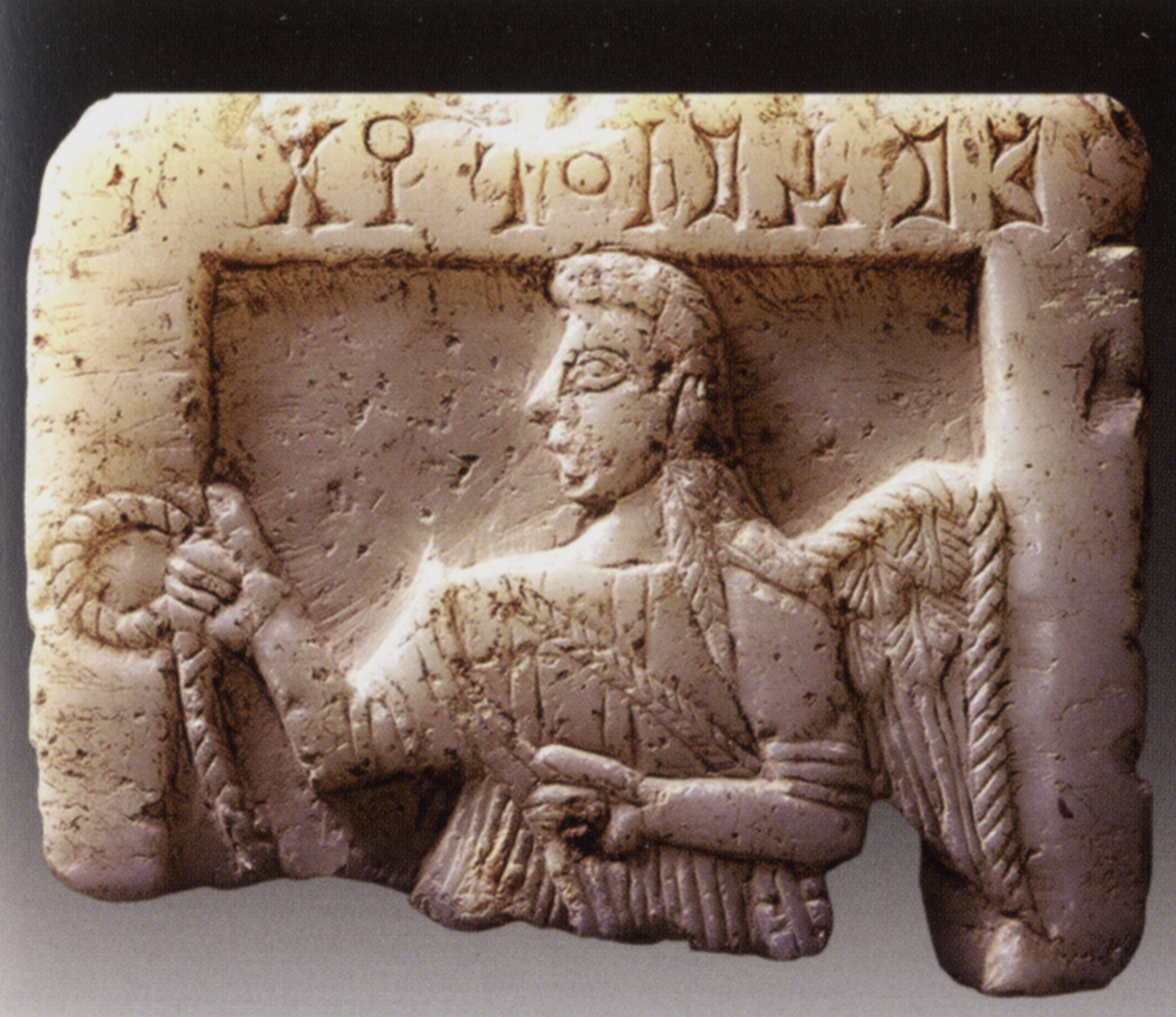
- A stele depicting Shams as a protective goddess

Equivalents
- North Arabian: Nuha
- Mesopotamian: Ishtar

Shams, also called Shamsum or Dhat-Ba' dhanum, is a sun goddess of Arabian mythology. She was the patron goddess of the Himyarite Kingdom. Her name meant 'shining', 'Sun', or 'brilliant'. She was the South Arabian equivalent of the North Arabian sun goddess Nuha.

Prior to Islam, religion on the Arabian Peninsula focused on local gods, with every tribe and kingdom having their particular protective deities. However, there were also gods common for all Arabs, and the trinity of gods representing the Sun, the Moon and the planet Venus seem to have been worshipped throughout Arabia, though their names, gender and worship differed between regions. Thus, Nuha was the name of the sun goddess in Northern Arabia, while the name of the sun goddess in Southern Arabia was Shams.

As Nuha, Shams was also worshipped in a trinity alongside the male gods of the Moon and Venus. In Saba', the sun goddess Shams was worshipped with the god of the planet Venus, Athtar, and Almaqah, the god of the Moon. In Hadhramaut, Shams was worshipped with Athtar and the moon god Syn. Shams was described as the spouse of Athtar who is also known as 'Attar. 'Attar is a God of War and also a giver of water that is essential to life. The antelope is sacred to him and a symbol of his is the spear-point. She was given votive offerings in the shape of horses.

In Mesopotamia, Athtar was identified with the goddess Ishtar, and Shams with the sun god Shamash.

According to Peter Stein, the "Hymn of Qaniya" is dedicated to this goddess.

== Gallery ==
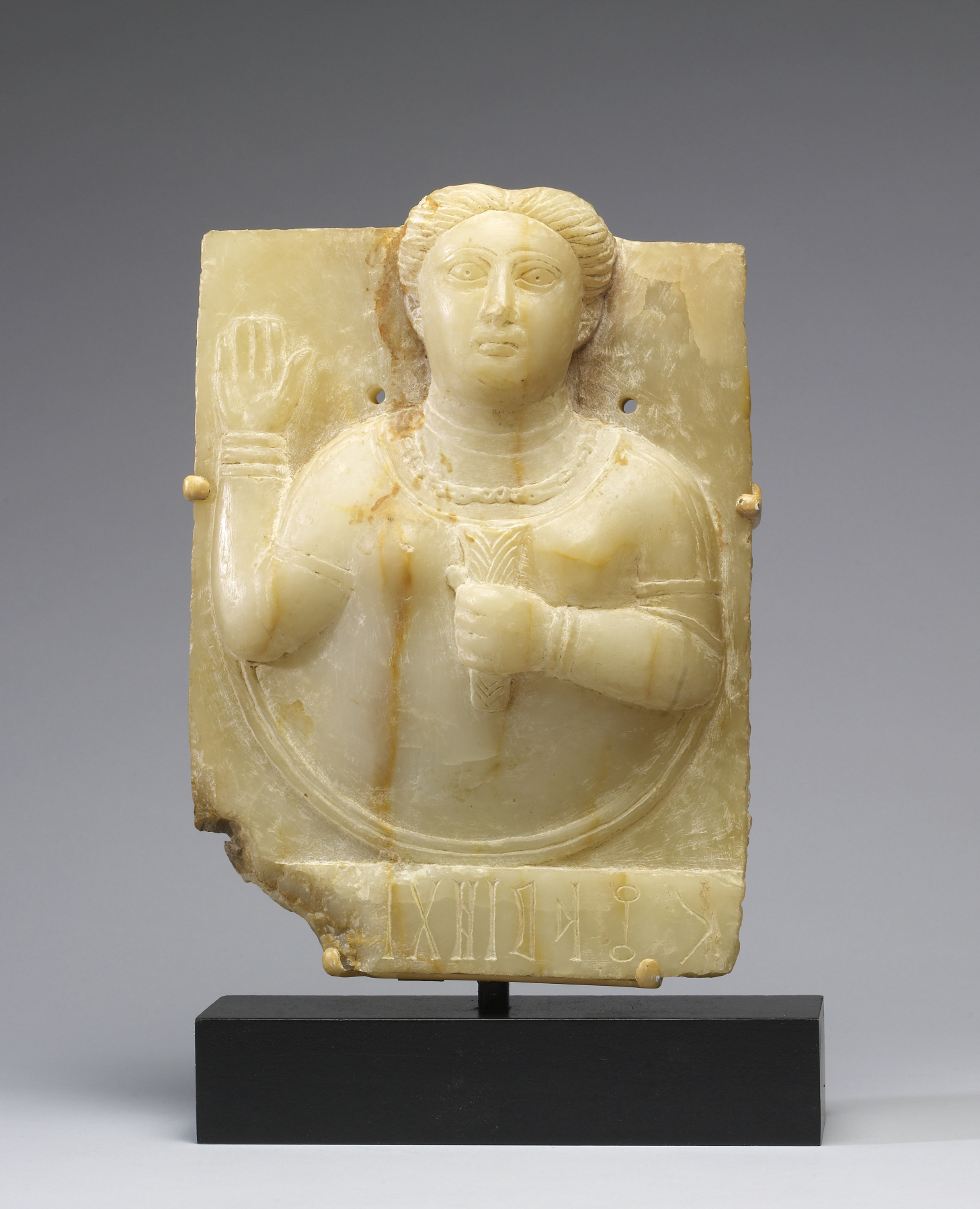
Sculpture of a Sabaean priestess raising her hand to intercede with the sun goddess on behalf of a donor. Probably first century.

== See also ==
- List of solar deities
- Utu, also known as Shamash

== Bibliography ==
- Encyclopedia of World Religions, Encyclopaedia Britannica, Inc., 2006
- Yoel Natan, Moon-o-theism, Volume I of II
- Tenri Journal of Religion, Tenri University Press, 1975
- Hoyland, Robert G. (2001). Arabia and the Arabs: From the Bronze Age to the Coming of Islam. Psychology Press. ISBN 978-0-415-19535-5.
- Lurker, Manfred (2015). A Dictionary of Gods and Goddesses, Devils and Demons. Routledge. ISBN 978-1-136-10628-6.
