= Nuha =

- Nuha (deity), a deity worshipped among the Northern Arabian tribes of pre-Islamic Arabia
- Shaki, Azerbaijan, a city in northwestern Azerbaijan also known as Nukha
- Noha, a Shia lament.
