= Orotalt =

God of pre-Islamic Arabia

According to the 5th century BCE Greek historian Herodotus, Orotalt (Ancient Greek: Ὀροτάλτ) was a god of pre-Islamic Arabia whom he identified with the Greek god Dionysus:

They believe in no other gods except Dionysus and the Heavenly Aphrodite; and they say that they wear their hair as Dionysus does his, cutting it round the head and shaving the temples. They call Dionysus, Orotalt; and Aphrodite, Alilat.

Also known as Đū Shará or Dusares (which means "Possessor of the (Mountain) Shara"), Orotalt was worshipped by the Nabataeans, Arabs who inhabited southern Jordan, Canaan and the northern part of Arabia.

== Etymology ==
Merriam-Webster's Encyclopedia of World Religions states that Orotalt is a phonetic transcription of the name of the sun god Ruḍā.

Brewer's Dictionary of Phrase and Fable derives it from a corruption of Allāh ta'āla ("God Exalted"). The transcription from Allāh ta'āla to Orotalt can be explained thus: The Semitic 'l' is commonly equated with 'r' in Greek, and vice versa. For example, the word "river" is Nahr in Arabic, Nehar in Hebrew and Nahal in other Semitic languages, which was likely transcribed as Νεῖλος in Greek (as in the Nile river).
