= Ruda (deity) =

Lunar deity of the Arabian pantheon

Ruḍaw
- Senior deity of the nomadic pantheon; head of the sedentary astral triad (possibly the Moon); Possibly a god of war, vengeance or assistance
- Member of Astral triad (alongside Nuhay and ʿAttarsamē)
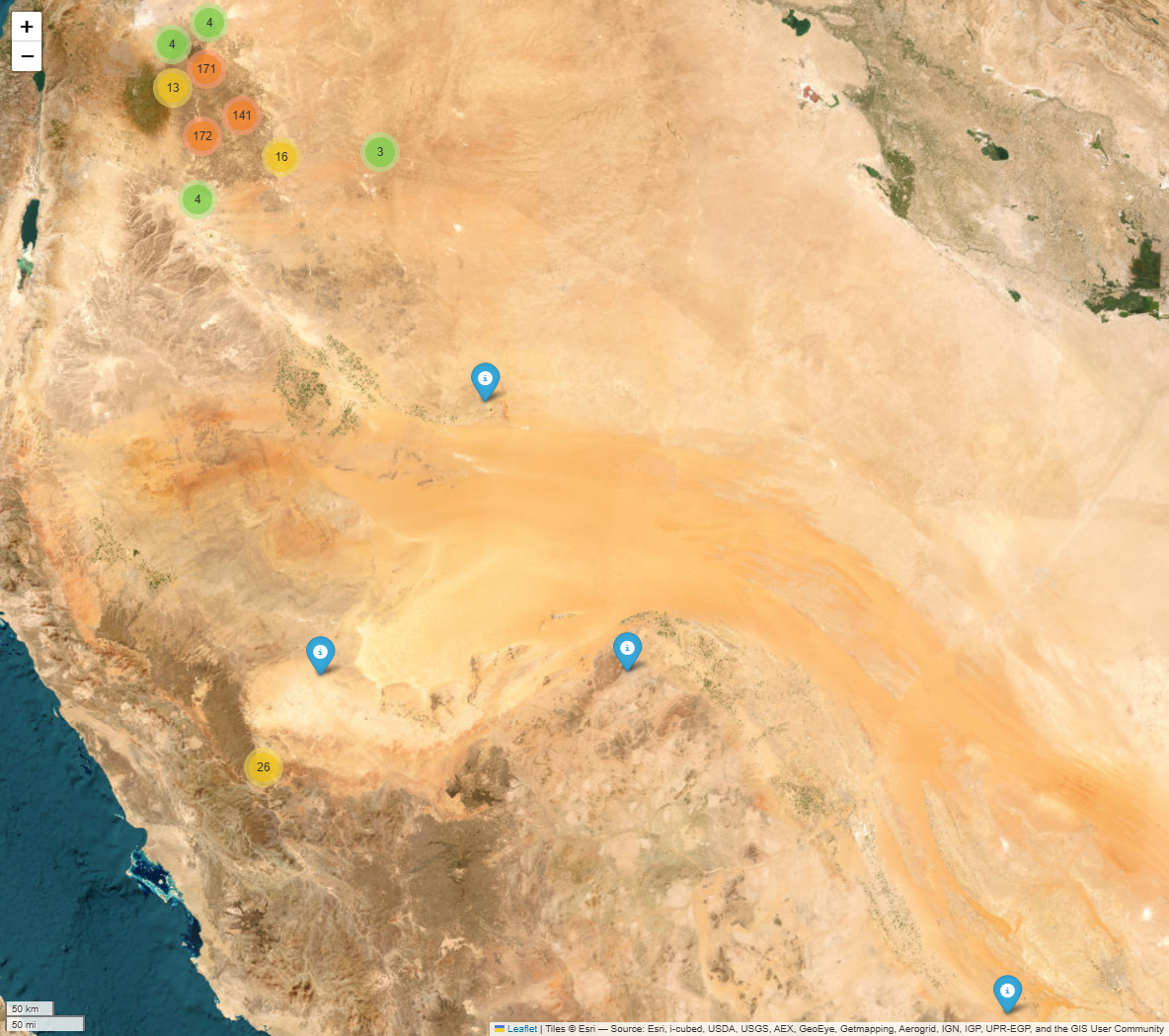
- Geographic distribution of inscriptions mentioning Ruda. Clusters indicate highly concentrated site counts. Data adapted from Online Corpus of the Inscriptions of North Arabia (OCIANA) till June 2026
- Venerated in: Dūmat al-Jandal (Adummatu), Ḥarrah basalt desert, central and eastern North Arabia
- Associate: Allāt, Nuhay, ʿAttarsamē
- Major cult center: Adummatu (modern Dūmat al-Jandal, Saudi Arabia)
- Symbol: Cult statues/idols (plundered by Sennacherib)
- Texts: Dumaitic, Thamudic B, and Safaitic inscriptions; Neo-Assyrian cuneiform source (Esarhaddon Prism); Early Islamic sources
- Gender: Masculine
- Region: North Arabia, Chaldea (Babylonia, as an epithet)
- Ethnic group: Ancient North Arabian nomadic tribes (Safaitic groups) and sedentary oasis populations (Dumaitic groups)
- Temple: Sanctuary at Adummatu; legendary temple destroyed by Al-Mustawġir

Genealogy
- Offspring: Allāt (Nomadic tradition)

Equivalents
- Greek: Zeus Safatenos (Suggested)
- Nabataean/Syrian equivalent: Arsu (Suggested)

Ruḍaw (Ancient North Arabian: rḍw, vocalized as /ruḍaw/, phonetically [ruɬaw]; later Safaitic variant rḍy, [roɬay]; Classical Arabic: رِضى or رَضاء) was a deity worshipped in North Arabia from at least the early first millennium BCE until the Late antiquity. He is first attested in a Neo-Assyrian royal inscription, and is subsequently attested throughout the Ancient North Arabian epigraphic corpora. His cult appears to have been regionally confined to central and eastern North Arabia, being notably absent from neighboring Hismaic, Dadanitic, and Nabataean epigraphy.

Although generally regarded as female in earlier scholarship, Ruḍaw is now understood to have been a masculine, paternal deity whose cultic role varied by community: among northern pastoral-nomadic tribes he stood at the head of the pantheon as father of the goddess Allāt, while in settled oasis communities he instead formed part of an astral triad with Nuhay (the sun) and ʿAttarsamē (Venus), within which he has been identified with the Moon. Scholars have further proposed various specific functions for the deity, including assistance, war or vengeance; some have also identified him with the deity Arsu.

By the early Islamic period, active knowledge of Ruḍaw's cult had faded, surviving only in fossilized theophoric names recorded by the genealogists and in a legendary account, preserved by Ibn Isḥāq and Ibn Hishām, of the destruction of his temple.

== Etymology and orthography ==
The name is recorded consonantally as rḍw in Dumaitic inscriptions from the Dūmat oasis, associated with the settled ("oasis") population of the region. On the basis of comparative Semitic phonology, scholars reconstruct the original vocalization as /ruḍaw/.

In later Safaitic inscriptions, produced by nomadic pastoralist groups of the basalt desert region (the Ḥarrah), the name shifts to Ruḍay. This later form corresponds directly to the orthography (رضى) subsequently preserved by the early Islamic genealogists.

Etymologically, the name derives from the Semitic root r-ḍ-w, signifying "favor", "good will", "contentment", or "grace".

== Historical attestations ==
=== Neo-Assyrian records ===
The earliest known reference to Ruḍaw does comes from the Mesopotamian source, Esarhaddon Prism, a cuneiform inscription on a clay prism that records the campaigns of the Assyrian king Sennacherib (r. 705–681), including his conquest of Adummatu (modern Dumat al-Jandal). According to the inscription, Sennacherib plundered the local sanctuary at Adummatu and carried several cult statues back to Assyria as spoils of war. Among the deities listed is an idol named ᵈRu-ul-da-a-a-u, understood by scholars as the Neo-Assyrian scribal transcription of Ruḍaw.

=== Herodotus' Orotalt ===
In the 5th century BCE, the Greek historian Herodotus noted in his Histories (III, 8) that the nomadic Arabians worshipped only two gods:

"They believe in no other gods except Dionysus and the Heavenly Aphrodite... they call Dionysus Orotalt (Ὀροτάλτ) and Aphrodite Alilat (Ἀλιλάτ)."

Hhistorians identify Orotalt as a Greek Hellenization of Ruḍaw.

== Epigraphic and geographic distribution ==
Ruḍaw is the second-most frequently attested deity in Safaitic inscriptions, surpassed in frequency only by Allāt (lt). Within the Arabian Peninsula, Ruḍaw is attested across several Ancient North Arabian epigraphic corpora, including Dumaitic, Thamudic B, and Safaitic inscriptions. These attestations span both the sedentary oasis population of Dūmat and the highly mobile pastoral-nomadic tribes of the northern Ḥarrah.

The deity is absent from the epigraphic corpora of neighboring cultures, including Hismaic, Dadanitic, and Nabataean inscriptions.

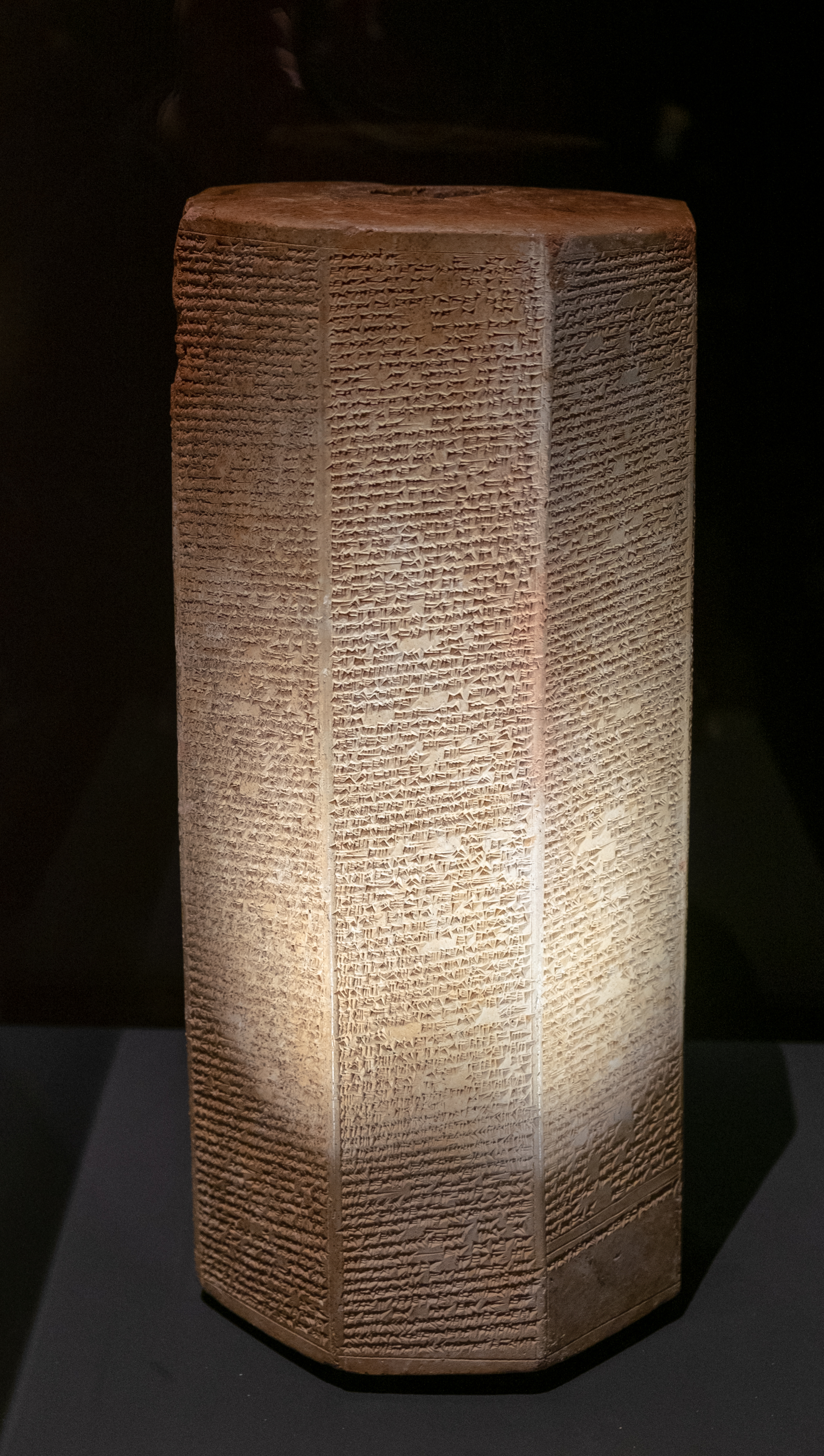
The Esarhaddon Prism which mentions the earliest reference of Ruḍaw.

== The "Ruḍaw of Chaldea" epithet ==
A recent Dumaitic inscription published invokes the deity with the epithet m-kśd, translating to "Ruḍaw from Chaldea" (Babylonia). This epithet is considered unusual, since Ruḍaw does not otherwise appear in native Babylonian or Persian cuneiform religious texts.

To explain the epithet, historian Ahmad Al-Jallad has proposed two alternative interpretations:

Achaemenid-era administrative texts attest to an Arab settlement near Nippur referred to as "The City of the Arabs". Al-Jallad suggests this community may have maintained a prominent temple to Ruḍaw in Chaldea, which nomadic Arabian groups may have journeyed to as a site of pilgrimage.

Alternatively, "Chaldea" may function symbolically rather than as a literal pilgrimage destination, associating Ruḍaw with the perceived power and prestige of the Mesopotamian empires. Al-Jallad compares this to the association of the early biblical Yahweh with distant, legendary strongholds such as Paran or Sinai, employed to emphasize divine majesty.

== Gender and cult structure ==
Twentieth-century scholarship generally regarded Ruḍaw as a female deity. More recent analysis of Ancient North Arabian epigraphic material has revised this consensus: Ruḍaw is now understood to have been worshipped as a masculine, paternal deity. His cultic role, however, differed substantially between nomadic and sedentary worshipping communities.

=== Nomadic paradigm ===
Among northern pastoral-nomadic groups, particularly the tribes producing Safaitic inscriptions, Ruḍaw held a position at the head of the pantheon. He was closely associated with the goddess Allāt, appearing structurally above her as a father figure.

=== Oasis paradigm ===
In the settled oasis communities of North Arabia, the cultic landscape differs markedly. Allāt is absent from the epigraphic record in this context. Instead, Ruḍaw appears as the senior member of an astral triad alongside Nuhay (associated with the sun) and Attarsamē (associated with the planet Venus)

Whether ʿAttarsamē and Allāt represent two distinct regional deities, or dialectal names for the same astral entity, remains a subject of ongoing scholarly debate.

=== Astral identification ===
Drawing structural comparisons with the divine astral triads of Mesopotamian and South Arabian religion, Al-Jallad concludes that the North Arabian triad reflects a broader shared Near Eastern cosmological pattern, in which Nuhay corresponds to the Sun and ʿAttarsamē to Venus. Within this framework, Ruḍaw, occupying the senior position in the triad, is identified with the Moon. In a Safaitic inscription, the epithet nʾr (the Luminous One) may have referred to Ruḍaw in this lunar capacity.

== Proposed functions and identifications ==
Beyond his position within the astral pantheon, scholars have proposed various theories regarding Ruḍaw's specific function or domain. Manar bint Othman has suggested that he may have been a god of assistance. Other academics have alternatively proposed that Ruḍaw may have functioned as a god of war or vengeance.

In one inscription, Ruḍaw is petitioned for rain, notably the only known instance in the Safatinic corpus in which a deity other than Baalshamin is invoked for this purpose. An inscription records that a worshipper entered a formal state of ritual purity before slaughtering an animal sacrifice to Rudaw to secure a she-camel as war spoil.

Separately, multiple scholars have proposed that the deity Arsu, attested in Aramaic and Palmyrene sources, represents an Aramaicized transcription of Ruḍaw.

Aleksandra Kubiak-Schneider and Achim Lichtenberger noted a dedication to a deity named Zeus Safatenos ("Zeus of the Safaites") from Bosra, suggesting this Greek title represents an interpretatio graeca of Ruḍaw as the supreme male deity of the Safaitic tribes.

== Later Islamic memory ==
By the early Islamic period, direct knowledge of Ruḍaw's cult had largely faded. Ibn al-Kalbī, writing in his Kitāb al-Aṣnām less than two centuries after the rise of Islam, records theophoric tribal names such as ʿAbdu-Ruḍà (Servant of Ruḍà) but states that he does not know whether the referents were originally idols. Al-Jallad suggests the cult had died out well before Islam, with the name surviving only as a fossilized element in tribal genealogies.

A legendary tradition recorded by Ibn Isḥāq and Ibn Hishām describes the destruction of "Ruḍaw's temple" by a certain Al-Mustawġir, said to have lived 330 years, who reportedly burned the sanctuary "charred black" and composed a poem celebrating its destruction. The narrative is understood as legendary rather by historians.

== See also ==
- Religion in pre-Islamic Arabia
- List of lunar deities
- List of war deities
