= Atarsamain =

Pre-Islamic morning star of heaven

Atarsamain (also spelled Attar-shamayin, Attarshamayin, Attarsame (ʿAttarsamē); "morning star of heaven") (Arabic: عثتر سمين) was an astral deity of uncertain gender, worshipped in the pre-Islamic northern and central Arabian Peninsula. Worshipped widely by Arab tribes, Atarsamain is known from around 800 BC and is identified in letters of the Assyrian kings Esarhaddon and Assurbanipal. Atarsamain may be identical with Allāt, whose cult was centred on Palmyra and also with Attar.

According to Dierk Lange, Atarsamain was the main deity in a trinity of gods worshipped by what he calls the Yumu'il Confederation, which he describes as a northern Arab tribal confederation of Ishmaelite ancestry headed by the "clan of Kedar" (i.e. the Qedarites). Lange identifies Nuha as the solar deity, Ruda as the lunar deity, and Atarsamin as the main deity associated with Venus. A similar trinity of gods representing the sun, moon and Venus is found among the peoples of the South Arabian kingdoms of Awsan, Ma'in, Qataban and Hadhramawt between the 9th and 4th centuries BC. There, the deity associated with Venus was Astarte, the sun deity was Yam, and moon deity was variously called Wadd, Amm and Sin.

Atarsamain is twice mentioned in the annals of Ashurbanipal, king of the Neo-Assyrian Empire in the 7th century BC. The reference is to a?lu (sā) a-tar-sa-ma-a-a-in ("the people of Attar of Heaven") who are said to have been defeated together with the Nebayot (Nebaioth/Nabataeans) and the Qedarites led by Yauta ben Birdadda, who was also known as "king of the Arabs".

== Bibliography ==
- Hoyland, Robert G. (2001), Arabia and the Arabs: from the Bronze Age to the coming of Islam (Illustrated, reprint ed.), Routledge, ISBN 978-0-415-19535-5
- Lange, Dierk (2004), Ancient kingdoms of West Africa: African-centred and Canaanite-Israelite perspectives : a collection of published and unpublished studies in English and French, J.H.Röll Verlag, ISBN 978-3-89754-115-3
- Retsö, Jan (2003), The Arabs in antiquity: their history from the Assyrians to the Umayyads (Illustrated ed.), Routledge, ISBN 978-0-7007-1679-1
