= Isaf and Na'ila =

Pre-Islamic Arabian deities

Isāf (Arabic: إساف) and Nā'ila (Arabic: نائلة) were two deities worshipped as a god and a goddess in pre-Islamic Arabia. They were primarily worshipped by the Quraysh.

== Attestations ==
Some Muslim scholars, including al-Azraqi, claimed that 'Amr ibn Luhayy, the patriarch of the Arab tribe Banu Khuza'a, who introduced idolatry in Mecca, was responsible for the worship of Isāf and Nā'ila. He had called on people to worship them and justified that their ancestors had already done so. The Qurayshi Qusaiy ibn Kilāb had then taken the two stones to the well of Zamzam near the Kaaba.

Isāf and Nā'ila were said to be particularly important to the Quraysh tribe, associated with Qurayshi sacrifices involving a talbiya specifically directed to Isāf.

Various legends existed about the idols, including one that they were petrified after they committed adultery in the Kaaba. Ibn al-Kalbi handed down the legend in his Book of Idols as follows:

They set out to perform the pilgrimage. Upon their arrival in Mecca they entered the Ka'bah. Taking advantage of the absence of anyone else and of the privacy of the Sacred House, Isaf committed adultery with her in the sanctuary. Thereupon they were transformed into stone, becoming two miskhs.

According to the traditions of the Meccan local historian al-Azraqī, the incident happened at the time when the Arab tribe of the Jurhum ruled over Mecca. The two stones were removed from the Kaaba and placed on the Al-Safa and Al-Marwah hills so that the people would be warned. Over time, they were then venerated as idols.

After the Muslim capture of the city in January 630, the two stone idols were destroyed.

== Interpretations ==
Aziz al-Azmeh believes that Isāf and Nā'ila were probably the original deities of the Quraysh, brought by them from their erstwhile territories to Mecca and worshipped continually along the regnant deities of Mecca, including al-'Uzza.
