= Nuha (deity) =

Deity worshipped among the Northern Arabian tribes of pre-Islamic Arabia

Nuha is a deity that was worshipped among the Northern Arabian tribes in pre-Islamic Arabia. Associated with the sun, she formed part of a trinity of gods, along with Ruda and Atarsamain. In Southern Arabia, Shams was her equivalent.

== Meaning ==
Nuha, from the triconsonantal Semitic root N-H-Y, may mean "the ultimate". An early Akkadian inscription from the annals of the kings of Assyria mention Nuha with the epithet "the elevated sun". While this reference can be read literally to mean that Nuha was associated with the sun, it can also be read metaphorically as a reference to special kind of wisdom.

== Worship ==
Dierk Lange writes that Nuha formed part of a trinity of gods worshipped by what he calls the Yumu'il confederation, which he describes as a northern Arab tribal confederation of Ishmaelite ancestry headed by the "clan of Kedar" (Qedarites). According to Lange, Nuha was the sun deity, Ruda the moon deity, and Atarsamain the main deity was associated with Venus.

A trinity of gods representing the sun, moon and Venus is also found among the peoples of the South Arabian kingdoms of Awsan, Ma'in, Qataban and Hadramawt between the 9th and 4th centuries BC. There, the deity associated with Venus was Astarte, the sun deity was Yam, and moon deity was variously called Wadd, Amm and Sin.

=== Inscriptions ===
Inscriptions in a North Arabian dialect in the region of Najd referring to Nuha describe emotions as a gift from her and the other gods. For example, one reads, "by Nuha is the flying into a rage", while another reads, "by Nuha is the jealousy of a lover". Other inscriptions indicate that all things good and bad were thought to come from the gods, such as in the inscription".

== Bibliography ==
- Hoyland, Robert G. (2001), Arabia and the Arabs: from the Bronze Age to the coming of Islam (Illustrated, reprint ed.), Routledge, ISBN 9780415195355
- Lange, Dierk (2004), Ancient kingdoms of West Africa: African-centred and Canaanite-Israelite perspectives : a collection of published and unpublished studies in English and French, J.H.Röll Verlag, ISBN 9783897541153
- Retsö, Jan (2003), The Arabs in antiquity: their history from the Assyrians to the Umayyads (Illustrated ed.), Routledge, ISBN 9780700716791
