= 'Amm =

Moon god worshipped in ancient Qataban

ʿAmm (Sabaean: 𐩲𐩣, romanized: ʿm; Arabic: عمّ) was a moon god worshipped in ancient Qataban, which was a kingdom in ancient Yemen. 'Amm's name stems from the Arabic word for paternal uncle. The inhabitants of the kingdom referred to themselves as the Banu Amm, or the "Children of Amm". He was also revered as a weather god, as his attributes included lightning bolts. His consort is the goddess Asherah, and he was served by the oracle-judge Anbay.

According to French archaeologist Christian Robin and biblical scholar Daniel E. Fleming, one possible origin for the title 'Amm or "Children of 'Amm" is speculated to have stemmed from a designation of an earlier group of people who worshiped 'Amm as a central god, with the name 'Amm simply being the title for a forgotten deity whose true designation was not known. Though 'Amm was worshipped during the time of the Qataban kingdom.
