= List of pre-Islamic Arabian deities =

Deities formed a part of the polytheistic religious beliefs in pre-Islamic Arabia, with many of the deities' names known. Up until about the emergence of Islam, polytheism was the dominant form of religion in Arabia. Deities represented the forces of nature, love, death, and so on, and were interacted with by a variety of rituals.

Formal pantheons are more noticeable at the level of kingdoms, of variable sizes, ranging from simple city-states to collections of tribes. The Kaaba alone was said to have contained 360 idols of many deities.^{[ 17:81]} Tribes, towns, clans, lineages and families also had their own cults. Christian Julien Robin suggests that this structure of the divine world reflected the society of the time.

Many deities did not have proper names and were referred to by titles indicating a quality, a family relationship, or a locale preceded by "he who" or "she who" (dhū or dhāt).

== Pantheons and groupings ==
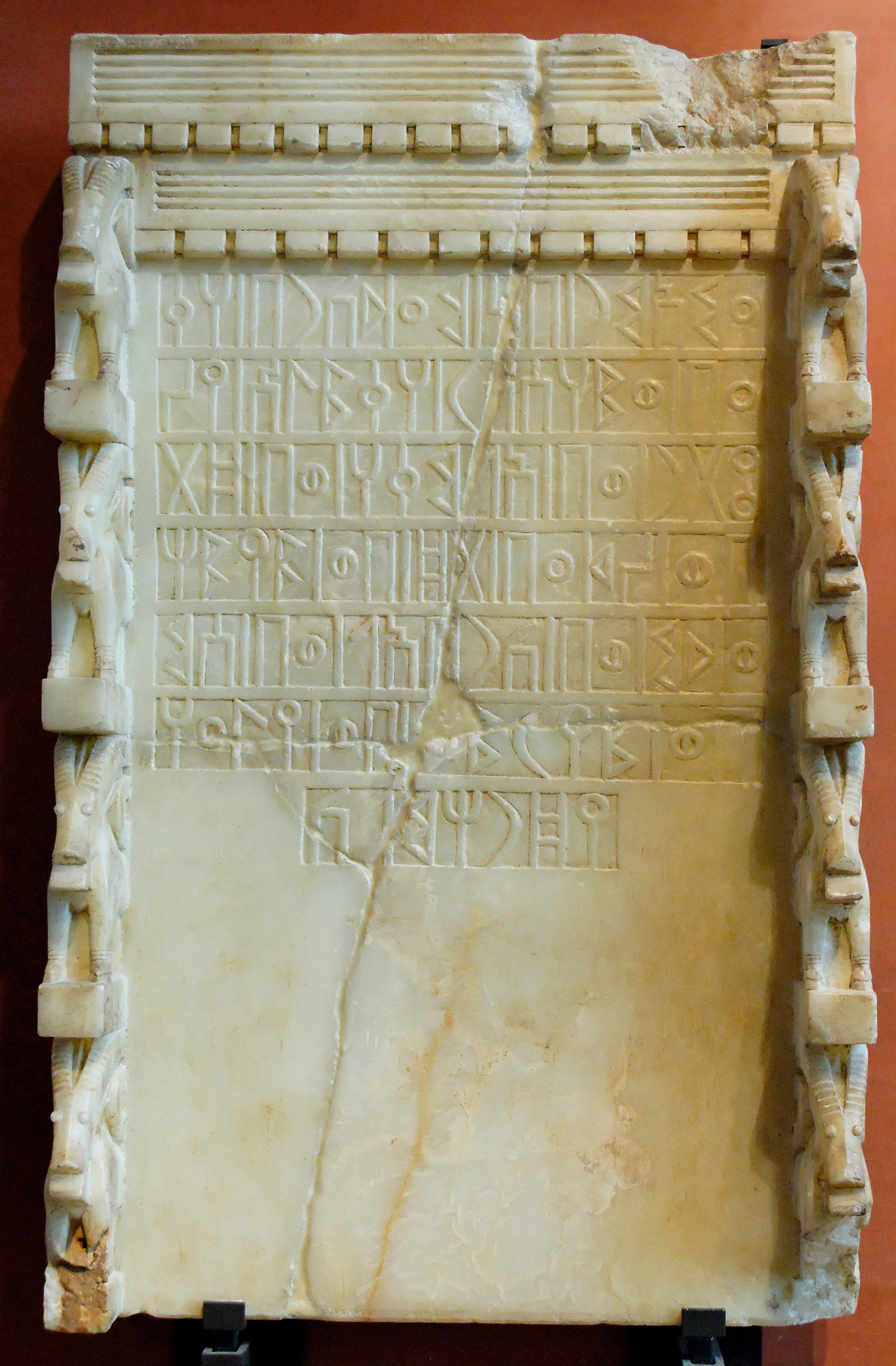
Sabaean inscription listing the gods ʿAṯtar, Almaqah, Dhat-Ḥimyam, Dhat-Badan and Wadd.

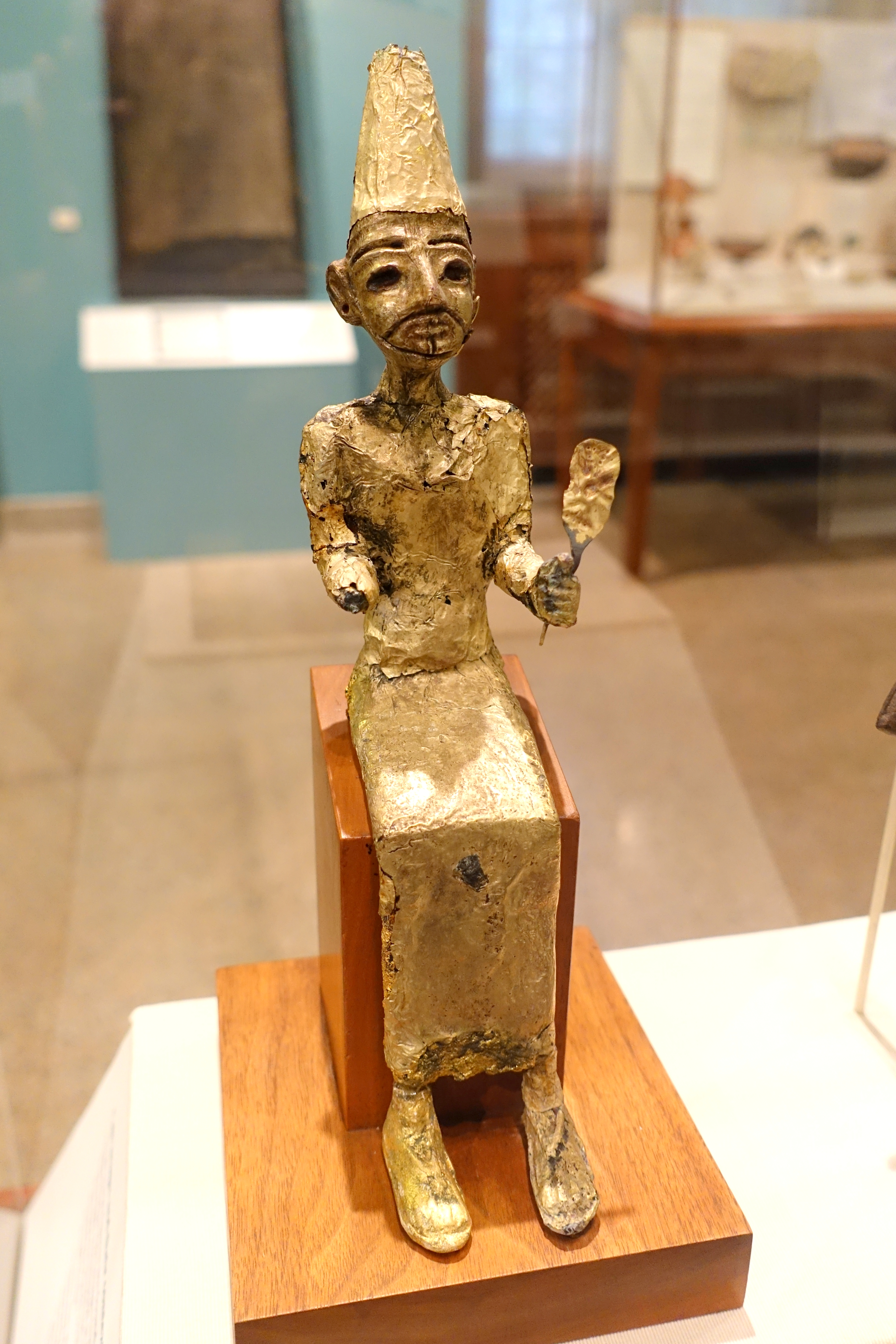
Gilded statue of the Canaanite deity El (c. 14–1200 BCE) from the site of Tel Megiddo. El appears in compound names like Gabriel, Michael, Azrael, Israel, Ishmael, Samuel and Raphael, and his name is cognate to Hebrew: אֱלֹהִים Elohim and Arabic: إله, romanized: ilah, lit. 'deity'

Pantheon	Deities
North Arabian ("Ma'addite"/"Maddeni") pantheon (including the Nabataeans, Palmyrenes, and Qedarites)	Abgal, Abirillu, A'im, Allat, 'Ammi'anas, A'ra, Arsu, Asira, Atarsamain, Atarquruma, Bajir, Dai, Dhat-Anwat, Dushara, Fils, Gad, Hubal, Isaf and Na'ila, al-Kutbay, Manaf, Manawat, Nuha, Nukhay, Al-Qaum, Quzah, Ruda (deity) (earlier known as Ruldaiu), Sa'd, Suwa', Theandrios, Al-Uqaysir, Al-Uzza
South Arabian ("Yemenite"/"Homeritae" [Himyarite]) pantheon (including the Sabaeans, Himyarites, Minaeans, Qatabanians, and Hadharem)	A'im, Almaqah, 'Amm, Anbay, Athirat, ʿAṯtar (both his general form and in the form of ʿAṯtar Shariqan), Balaw, Basamum, Dhat-Badan, Dhat-Himyam, Dhat-Sanat, Dhat-Zahran, Dhu'l-Khalasa, Gad, Haubas, Haukim, Hawl, Nasr, Nikrah, Qaynan, Shams, Sīn, Ta'lab, Wadd, Yaghūth, Yatha, Ya'uq

== Alphabetical list ==
Name	Description	Attestations	
Name	Description	Pre-Islamic era	Islamic tradition
'Amm	'Amm is the moon god of Qataban. His attributes include the lightning bolts. Amm is served by the judge-god Anbay and has the goddess Athirat as his consort. Qatabanians are also known as Banu Amm, or "children of Amm".	Attested (Note: Attested in archaeological and/or epigraphic evidence)	
'Ammi'anas	'Ammi'anas is a god worshipped by the Khawlan. According to the Book of Idols, the Khawlan would offer a portion of their livestock property and land products and give one part to 'Ammi'anas and the other to God. While no epigraphic evidence of this god is known, the existence of 'Ammi'anas cannot be ruled out as his name is present in the personal name of a Khawlanite leader.		Attested (Note: Attested in al-Kalbi's Book of Idols)
'Athtar	'Athtar is the god associated with the planet Venus and was the most common god to south Arabian cultures. He is a god of thunderstorms and natural irrigation. As Athtar was considered remote, worship was usually directed to the patron deity of a kingdom/culture.	Attested	
A'im	A'im is a god who was worshipped by the Azd of al-Sarah.		Attested
A'ra	A'ra, known in Greek as Aarras, is a north Arabian tutelary god known from inscriptions in Bosra. The name implies a holy place or an altar, but its Arabic root also means "to dye". It is implied that many sacrifices (which may include children) were offered to the cult image, staining it with blood. Equated with the Nabataean Dushara who was also worshipped as Dushara-A'ra.	Attested	
Abgal	Abgal is a tutelary god worshipped by nomads, including bedouins, and a tutelary god of the Arabs of the Palmyra region. His name is found in inscriptions dating to the times of the Palmyrene Empire, but none in Palmyra itself.	Attested	
Abirillu	Abirillu is a god mentioned in an Assyrian inscription.	Attested	
Al-Lat	Al-Lat is a goddess associated with fertility and war. Her cult was spread throughout the Arabian Peninsula and as far as Palmyra. She was equated with Athena, the Greek goddess of war. In the Hejaz region, she was especially worshipped by the Banu Thaqif of Ta'if, and she was also worshipped by the Nabataeans of North Arabia. There is also evidence of her worship in South Arabia and Qedar, with her name being attested in inscriptions. In Islamic tradition, her worship was ended with the destruction of her shrine in Ta'if.	Attested	Attested
Almaqah	Almaqah was the chief-god of the Sabaeans, and a god of artificial irrigation. Associated with the bull's head and vines, he was regarded as the progenitor of the Sabaeans, and his worship spread to the Ethiopian kingdoms of Dʿmt and Kingdom of Aksum.	Attested	
Anbay	Anbay is a god worshipped in Qataban, alongside Hawkim, as gods of "command and decision". He was regarded as a deity of justice and an oracle, in attendance to the moon deity Amm. Anbay's name was invoked in a range of legal matters, from filing paperwork for the legal title of a building to the royal regulation of water supplies. His name is related to the name of the Babylonian god Nabu.	Attested	
Aranyada'		Attested	
Arsu	Arsu is a northern Arabian god worshipped in Palmyra. He personifies the evening star, while the morning star is personified by Azizos, and he is associated with horses and camels. He is equated with Ruda, who was worshipped elsewhere in northern Arabia.	Attested	
Ashar	Ashar is one of the nomadic gods of the Arabs during the Palmyrene Empire period, along with Azizos, Ma'n, Abgal, Sha'd, and Mun'im.	Attested	
Asira	Asira is named in an inscription listing the deities of Tayma.	Attested	
Atarquruma	Atarquruma is a god worshipped by the Qedarites mentioned in an Assyrian inscription. He probably originated as a form of Athtar, who in Saba was associated with Kurum, thought to be a hypostasis or a consort of Athtar.	Attested	
Atarsamain	Atarsamain is a deity of uncertain gender, worshipped among the Qedarites, and was associated with Venus. He was particularly worshipped by the Isamme tribe.	Attested	
Athirat	Athirat is a goddess worshipped in Qataban as the consort of 'Amm. Cognate to the West Semitic Athirat/Asherah who usually has El as her consort.	Attested	
Athtar Shariqan	Athtar Shariqan is a form of Athtar who was invoked as an avenger against enemies. The word "Shariqan" means "the Eastern One". The worship of this god has spread to the Central Arabian kingdom of Kindah, where his name appears in Qaryat al-Fawt.	Attested	
Al-Uqaysir	Al-Uqaysir is a god whose cult image stood in Syria. According to the Book of Idols, his adherents include the tribes of Quda'a, Banu Lakhm, Judhah, Banu Amela, and Ghatafan. Adherents would go on a pilgrimage to the cult image and shave their heads, then mix their hair with wheat, "for every single hair a handful of wheat."		Attested
Al-‘Uzzá	Al-'Uzzá is a goddess associated with might, protection and love. Equated with the Greek goddess Aphrodite, she was an important goddess of the Nabataeans, and a temple dedicated to her was set up at Petra. In the Hejaz, she became the chief goddess of the Quraysh, and a shrine housing three trees once stood in Nakhla. In pre-Islamic poetry, she was invoked as a symbol of beauty. In South Arabia, she was known as Uzzayān and she was associated with healing. In Islamic tradition, her worship was ended with the destruction of her shrine in Nakhla.	Attested	Attested
Bajir	Bajir is a minor god of the Azd.		Attested
Balaw	Balaw is a god worshipped in the kingdom of Awsan alongside Wadd.	Attested	
Basamum	Basamum is a god worshipped in South Arabia whose name may be derived from Arabic basam, or balsam, a medicinal plant, indicating that he may be associated with healing or health. One ancient text relates how Basamum cured two wild goats/ibexes.	Attested	
Dai	Dai is named in an Assyrian inscription.	Attested	
Datin	Datin is a god primarily known from inscriptions in northern Arabia, but his function is unknown.	Attested	
Dhat-Anwat	Dhat-Anwat is a tree deity worshipped by the Quraysh. The tree stood between Mecca and Yathrib, and devotees hang their weapons on it.		Attested
Dhat-Badan	Dhat-Badan is a goddess of the oasis, worshipped in tree-circled pools.	Attested	
Dhat-Sanat	Dhat-Sanat is a Qatabanian goddess who formed part of their official pantheon.	Attested	
Dhat-Zahran	Dhat-Zahran is a Qatabanian goddess who formed part of their official pantheon.	Attested	
Dhu-Ghabat	Dhu-Ghabat was the chief god of the Lihyanites, who rarely turned to others for their needs. His name means "he of the thicket".	Attested	
Dhu al-Kaffayn	Dhu al-Kaffayn is, according to the Book of Idols, a god worshipped by the Daws, specifically the banu-Munhib ibn-Daws. His name means "he of the two palms".		Attested
Dhu'l-Khalasa	Dhu'l-Khalasa is a god worshipped by the Bajila and the Khath'am tribes, and was reportedly worshipped as a "god of redemption". His temple became known as the Kaaba of Yemen.		Attested
Dhu Samawi	Dhu Samawi, literally "the Heavenly One", is a god who probably originated from northern Arabia, but also found worship in south Arabia. The Bedouin would offer votive statuettes of camels, to ensure well-being of their herds. The Amir tribe also worshipped this god, and in inscriptions Dhu-Samawi was regarded as the "god of Amir".	Attested	
Dushara	Dhu al-Shara/Dushara is a mountain god worshipped primarily by the Nabataeans as their chief-god, and also by the Banū al-Hārith ibn-Yashkur ibn-Mubashshir clan of the Azd. Probably originating as an aspect of Ruda, he is associated with the Sun and the planet Mercury.	Attested	Attested
Fils	Fils is a god who, according to the Book of Idols, is associated with animals, and that animals roaming in the territory of his cult image would become a property of the god. Primarily worshipped by the Tayy tribe, his cult image and sanctuary was said to be located on the Jabal Aja.	Attested	Attested
Halfan	Halfan is a god who, according to Edouard. Dhorme, is associated with oath in https://www.persee.fr/doc/rhr_0035-1423_1947_num_133_1_5565	Attested	
Gad	Gad is a pan-Semitic god of fortune who is also attested in Arabia.	Attested	
Ghayyan	Ghayyan is a god worshipped by the Banu Umayya of the Aws tribe. Since Ghayyan's name can be traced in the traditional genealogy of the Umayya, it is possible that Ghayyan is a deified ancestor.		Attested
Al-Harish	Al-Harish is a god worshipped by the Banu 'Abd al-Ashhal of the Aws tribe. Since al-Harish's name can be traced in the traditional genealogy of the 'Abd al-Ashhal, it is possible that al-Harish is a deified ancestor.		Attested
Haubas	Haubas is an oracular deity of the Sabaeans. The deity's gender varies from area to area; in places where the deity is female, she is regarded as the consort of Athtar.	Attested	
Haukim	Haukim is a god of law and justice, worshipped alongside Anbay as gods of "command and decision". His name is derived from the root "to be wise".	Attested	
Hawl	Hawl was probably a moon god, as his name may have alluded to the lunar cycle. He was worshipped in Hadhramawt.	Attested	
Hilal	Hilal is a god of the new moon.		
Hubal	Hubal is a god associated with divination. His cult image stood in the Kaaba, and his rituals were in the form of throwing divination arrows before the image, in cases of virginity, death and marriage. He is worshipped by many tribes, including the Quraysh, who controlled access to the image. Hubal's name also appears in a Nabataean inscription in Mada'in Saleh, along with Dushara and Manat.	Attested	Attested
Isaf and Na'ila	Isaf and Na'ila are a pair of deities, a god and a goddess, whose cult was centered near the Well of Zamzam. Islamic tradition gave an origin story to their cult images; a couple who were petrified by Allah as they fornicated inside the Kaaba.		Attested
Al-Jalsad	Al-Jalsad is a god worshipped by the Kindah in Hadhramawt.		Attested
Jihar	Jihar is a god worshipped by the Banu Hawazin. His image stood in 'Ukaz. Jihar is invoked in a talbiyah for longevity.		Attested
Kahl	Kahl is the patron god of the Kindah kingdom whose capital was Qaryat al-Faw. The town was called Dhat Kahl after him. His name appears in the form of many inscriptions and rock engravings on the slopes of the Tuwayq, on the walls of the souk of the village, in the residential houses and on the incense burners.	Attested	
Al-Kutbay	Al-Kutbay is a god of writing worshipped by the Nabataeans.	Attested	
Ma'n	Ma'n is one of the nomadic gods of the Arabs in Palmyra, paired with Sha'd. Ma'n's feast at Palmyra was celebrated on the sixteenth of August, on which meals of beef were feasted. The name Ma'n was also attested in Nabataean names, as well as the names of members of Edessa's royal family.	Attested	
Malik	Malik is a god attested in northern Arabian inscriptions. His name means "king".	Attested	
Manaf	Manaf is a god, described by Muslim scholar At-Tabari as "one of the greatest deities of Mecca", although little information is available about him. He is attested in the Hauran as Zeus Manaphos, equated with Zeus. It is said that women would keep his image away during menstruation. Some scholars suggest that Manaf might be a solar god.	Attested	Attested
Manāt	Manāt is the goddess of fate, destiny and death. In Nabataean and Latin inscriptions she was known as Manawat. She is an ancient goddess, predating both Al-Lāt and Al-'Uzzá. She was associated with Dushara and Hubal, and was equated with the Greek goddess Nemesis. She became the chief goddess of both the Banu Aws and Banu Khazraj, the two polytheistic tribes of Yathrib (Medina). In Islamic tradition, her worship was ended with the destruction of her shrine in the shore of al-Qudayd.	Attested	Attested
Al-Muharriq	Al-Muharriq is a god worshipped by the Banu Bakr ibn Wa'il and the rest of the Banu Rabi'ah, as well as by the Banu Tamim. His name means "the burner".		Attested
Mun'im	Mun'im, rendered in Greek as Monimos, was one of the nomadic gods of the Arabs during the Palmyrene Empire period, along with Azizos, Ma'n, Abgal, Sha'd, and Ashar.	Attested	
Nab'al	Nab'al was a god worshipped in Kaminahu.	Attested	
Nasr	Nasr is a god worshipped by the Himyarites and, according to the Book of Idols, was worshipped in a place called Balkha. The tribe of Rabi`ah worshipped the god Nasr.	Attested	Attested
Nikrah	Nikrah is a god associated with healing worshipped by the Minaeans. His shrine was an asylum for dying people and women in childbirth.		
Nuha	Nuha is a goddess associated with the Sun. She was also associated with emotions, as described in various inscriptions in Najd, Saudi Arabia.	Attested	
Nuhm	Nuhm is a god worshipped by the Muzaynah, who named their children Abd-Nuhm after him.		Attested
Al-Qayn	Al-Qayn is a god worshipped by the Banu 'Amr ibn 'Awf of the Aws tribe.		Attested
Qaynan	Qaynan is a Sabaean god, and based on etymology, might be a god of smiths.	Attested	
Qaysha		Attested	
Quzah	Quzah is a weather and a mountain god, as well as a god of the rainbow, worshipped by the people of Muzdalifah. His attribute is the bow and arrows of hailstones. He was probably syncretized with the Edomite god Qos and became known as qaws quzah.		Attested
Rahm	Rahm is an attested to be worshipped in Palmyra (current Syria) asid Shams and Allat.		
Rahmanan	Rahmanan was the singular, monotheistic god of South Arabia in the fifth century onwards.		Attested
Ruda	Ruda is an important solar god in North Arabia. He is named in an Assyrian inscription as Ruldaiu and is frequently mentioned in Thamudic and Safaitic inscriptions. Dushara may have originated as a form of Ruda.	Attested	Attested
Sa'd	Sa'd is a god of fortune worshipped by the Banu Kinanah tribe. His cult image was a tall stone situated in the desert, and animals were sacrificed there for blessings.		Attested
Al-Sa'ida	Al-Sa'ida was a god whose cult image stood on Mount Uhud, but it is not known if he was worshipped in a temple (haram).		Attested
Sakhr	Sakhr is a god worshipped by the Banu Haritha of the Aws tribe.		Attested
Salm		Attested	
Al-Samh	Al-Samh is a god worshipped by the Banu Zurayq of the Khazraj tribe.		Attested
Sha'd	Sha'd was one of the nomadic gods of the Arabs in Palmyra, paired with Ma'n.	Attested	
Shafr	Shafr is a god worshipped by the Banu Khatma of the Aws tribe.		Attested
Shams	Shams/Shamsum is a female solar deity, possibly related to the Canaanite Shapash and the broader middle-eastern Shamash. She was the dominant goddess of the Himyarite Kingdom, and possibly still revered in some form by the Bedouin for several centuries afterward.	Attested	Attested
Shay al-Qawm	Shay al-Qawm, "who he accompanies the people", is a god associated with war and the night and protection of caravans, primarily attested in Safaitic and, although less frequently, Nabataean. He is described as a god "who drinks no wine, who builds no home". Shay al-Qawm is also attested in Palmyra in an inscription dedicated by a Nabataean. It is possible that the Lihyanite deity QM (Qawm) is a hypocoristic of his name .	Attested	
Shingala	Shingala was named in an inscription listing the deities of Tayma.	Attested	
Su'ayr	Su'ayr is an oracular god of the 'Anazzah tribe.		Attested
Suwa'	Suwa' is a god worshipped by the Hudhayl tribe.		Attested
Syn	Syn was the chief-god of the Hadhramites. His role is disputed; while he may be connected to the Moon, and by extension, the Semitic god Sin, his symbol is the eagle, a solar symbol.	Attested	
Ta'lab	Ta'lab is a moon god primarily worshipped by the Sum'ay, a Sabaean tribal confederation which consisted of the tribes Hashid, Humlan and Yarsum. He was also associated with pastures. He had an important temple in Riyam.	Attested	
Theandrios	Theandrios is the Greek name of a god worshipped by the Arab tribes of Mount Hermon.	Attested	
Wadd	Wadd is the national god of the Minaeans and he was also associated with snakes. According to the Book of Idols, the Kalb worshipped him in the form of a man and is said to have represented heaven, and his cult image reportedly stood at Dumat al-Jandal.	Attested	Attested
Al-Ya'bub	Al-Ya'bub is a god that belonged to the Jadilah clan of Tayy, who according to the Book of Idols abstained from food and drink before him. It is said that the clan originally worshipped a different cult image until the tribe Banu Asad took it away from them.		Attested
Ya'uq	Ya'uq is a god worshipped by the Khaywin.		Attested
Yaghūth	Yaghūth is a god worshipped by the Madhhij, a Qahtanite confederation. The people of Jurash in Yemen also worshipped him.		Attested
Yatha	Yatha is a god associated with salvation. His name means "Savior".	Attested	

== See also ==
- List of rulers of Saba and Himyar
- List of wars and battles in pre-Islamic Arabia
