= List of mythological pairs =

This is a list of famous pairs in mythology:

* Achilles and Patroclus (Greek)
- Indra and Indrani (Hindu)
- Isis and Osiris (Egyptian)
- Ixchel and Itzamna (Mayan)
- Izanami-no-Mikoto and Izanagi (Japanese)
- Kaliyan and Kalicchi (Southern Hindu)
- Kamadeva and Rati (Hindu)
- Krishna and Rukmini (Hindu)
- Krishna and Satyabhama (Hindu)
- Lancelot and Guinevere (Arthurian)
- Layla and Majnun (Middle Eastern)
- Leda and the swan (Greek)
- Medea and Jason (Greek)
- Minos and Pasiphaë (Greek)
- Nakula and Draupadi (Hindu)
- Nala and Damayanti (Hindu)
- Narcissus and Echo (Greek)
- Nereus and Doris (Greek)
- Nyx and Erebus (Greek)
- Odysseus and Penelope (Greek)
- Orpheus and Eurydice (Greek)
- Paris and Helen (Greek)
- Persephone and Hades (Greek)
- Perseus and Andromeda (Greek)
- Philemon and Baucis (Greek)
- Phyllis and Demophon (Greek)
- Popocatépetl and Iztaccíhuatl (Aztec), two volcanoes
- Poseidon and Amphitrite (Greek)
- Proserpina and Pluto (Roman)
- Pyramus and Thisbe (Greek)
- Pyrrhus and Andromache (Greek)
- Rama and Sita (Hindu)
- Sahadeva and Draupadi (Hindu)
- Sampooranathevan and Paradevathai (Southern Hindu)
- Savitri and Satyavan (Hindu)
- Scylla and Glaucus (Greek)
- Selene and Endymion (Greek)
- Shiva and Parvati/Sati (Hindu)
- Sigurd and Brunhild (Norse)
- Siyavash and Sudabeh (Persian)
- The Cowherd and the Weaver Girl (Chinese), representing Altair and Vega and commemorated by the annual Qixi Festival
- Theseus and Ariadne (Greek)
- Theseus and Hippolyta (Greek)
- Thetis and Peleus (Greek)
- Tristan and Iseult (Arthurian)
- Troilus and Cressida (Greek)
- Thoth and Ma’at (Egyptian)
- Ulysses and Circe (Greek)
- Ulysses and Penelope (Greek)
- Venus and Adonis (Greek - Roman)
- Vishnu and Lakshmi (Hindu)
- Yarilo and Mara (Slavic)
- Yudhishthira and Draupadi (Hindu)
- Yusuf and Zulaikha (Islamic)
- Zal and Rudabeh (Persian)
- Zeus and Ganymede (Greek)
- Zeus and many mortal women and nymphs (see Zeus)

== Twins ==
See: Twins in mythology

- Aegyptus and Danaus (Greek)
- Aeolus and Boeotus (Greek)
- Agenor and Belus (Greek)
- Amphion and Zethus (Greek)
- Apollo and Artemis/Diana (Greek) (Roman)
- Arsu and Azizos (Palmyran)
- Ascalaphus and Ialmenus (Greek)
- Atreus and Thyestes (Greek)
- Ashvins (Hindu)
- Ašvieniai divine twins (Lithuanian)
- Byblis and Caunus (Greek)
- Cassandra and Helenus (Greek)
- Castor and Pollux (Greek)
- Draupadi and Dhrishtadyumna (Hindu)
- Dylan ail Don and Lleu Llaw Gyffes (Welsh)
- Erechtheus and Butes (Greek)
- Eurysthenes and Procles (Greek)
- Freyr and Freyja (Norse)
- Glooscap and Malsumis (American Indian)
- Heracles and Iphicles (Greek)
- Iasus and Pelasgus (Greek)
- Hunahpu and Xbalanque (Maya)
- Hypnos/Somnus and Thanatos/Mors, Letum (Greek) - (Roman)
- Lakshmana and Shatrughna (Hindu)
- Lava and Kusha (Hindu)
- Lycastus and Parrhasius (Greek)
- Manawydan and Brân (Welsh)
- Nakula and Sahadeva (Hindu)
- Nara and Narayana (Hindu)
- Nut and Geb (Egyptian)
- Otos and Ephialtes (Greek)
- Pelias and Neleus (Greek)
- Phobos and Deimos (Greek)
- Phrixus and Helle (Greek)
- Ploutos and Philomenos (Greek)
- Procles and Eurysthenes (Greek)
- Proetus and Acrisius (Greek)
- Romulus and Remus (Roman)
- Set and Nephthys (Egyptian)
- Sigmund/Siegmund and Signy/Sieglinde (Norse)
- Thessalus and Alcimenes (Greek)
- Xōchipilli and Xōchiquetzal (Aztec)
- Xolotl and Quetzalcoatl (Aztec)
- Yama and Yami (Hindu)
- Zetes and Calais, the Boreads (Greek)

== Other siblings ==
- Agamemnon and Menelaus (Greek)
- Balin and Balan (Arthurian)
- Baldr and Hodr (Norse)
- Eteocles and Polynices (Greek)
- Hänsel and Gretel (German)
- Hengist and Horsa (Saxon)
- Podalirius and Machaon (Greek)
- Prometheus and Epimetheus (Greek)
- Rama and Lakshmana (Hindu)

== Friends ==
- Arjuna and Krishna (Hindu)
- Damon and Pythias (Greek)
- Karna and Duryodhana (Hindu)
- Orestes and Pylades (Greek)
- Theseus and Pirithous (Greek)

== Rivals ==
- Athena and Poseidon (Greek)
- Brihaspati and Chandra (Hindu)
- Eros and Anteros (Greek)
- Abe no Seimei and Ashiya Dōman (Japanese)
- Indra and Vritra (Hindu)
- Karna and Arjuna (Hindu)
- Vashistha and Vishvamitra (Hindu)

== Parent and Child(ren) duo ==
- Arjuna and Abhimanyu (Hindu)
- Daedalus and Icarus (Greek)
- Ganga and Bhishma (Hindu)
- Hidimbi and Ghatotkacha (Hindu)
- Janaka and Sita (Hindu)
- Kunti and Arjuna (Hindu)
- Madri and Sahadeva (Hindu)
- Oedipus and Antigone (Greek)
- Scylla and Charybdis (Greek)
- Shiva and Ganesha (Hindu)
- Subhadra and Abhimanyu (Hindu)
- Sumitra and Lakshmana (Hindu)
- Surya and Karna (Hindu)
- Uttarā and Parikshit (Hindu)
- Yashoda and Krishna (Hindu)

== See also ==
- lists of pairs
