= Monimos =

Syrian god of the evening star

In Near Eastern mythology, Monimos (Mun'im) is the Arab god of the evening star (Hesperos), the counterpart of Azizos, the morning star. Both gods were companions of Helios, the sun. Monimos is identified with the Palmyrene god Arsu.

Julian identifies Monimos with Hermes in his work 'Hymn to King Helios'. He says "Iamblichus, from whom I have taken this and all besides, a little from a great store, says that the secret meaning to be interpreted is that Monimos is Hermes and Azizos Ares, the assessors of Helios, who are the channel for many blessings to the region of our earth." Apparently, however, this identification with the Greek gods was not based on "planetary connotations", but on their attributes. The name "Mun'im" means "the beneficent one", the protector of caravans, and therefore was associated with Hermes in his role as the protector of travellers.
