= Zyz =

Zyz or ZYZ may refer to:

- Azizos, ʿzyz in Phoenician, a deity
- Zyz (magazine), a Ukrainian satirical magazine
- Antwerpen-Berchem railway station, IATA code: ZYZ

== See also ==
- Zyzz (1989–2011), Australian bodybuilder
