= Abgal (god) =

Pre-Islamic Arabian god

Abgal (Arabic: أبغال) was a pre-Islamic Arabian god, whose worship is attested by inscriptions dating to the Palmyrene Empire – he is thought to have been primarily worshipped by nomads.

== Overview ==
Abgal is known as a tutelary deity of the Arabs (or jinn) in the Palmyra region. Representations of him are of a youth with long hair and a moustache, wearing local garb, and holding a lance. He had a Greco-Roman style temple at Khirbet Semrin where he is portrayed on a relief riding a horse, equipped with bow and quiver attached to the saddle.

A stele with imagery of Abgal and Ashar, and earlier inscriptions at Kirbet-Semrin dates the active 'worship' of this jinn to between 154 and 270 AD – references to the deity appear in the Palmyrene Empire but none have been found at Palmyra itself. A monument from Jebel al-Abiad (153AD) mentions him together with the deities Bel, Baalshamin, Aglibol, Malakbel, Astarte, Nemesis, and Arsu, though according to Teixidor 1979 he was a god of nomads, and usually mentioned in association with nomadic gods such as Azizos, Maan, Ashar, or Shalman.

According to (Drijvers 1980) representation of such deities (also Arsu, Asar, and Azizu) as armed and mounted men in statuary in a pair together was common across the desert regions of Syria/Mesopotamia – and together these representations may have represented divine protection.

== Sources ==
- Teixidor, Javier (1979), The pantheon of Palmyra, Leiden: Brill
- Drijvers, H.J.W. (1980), Cults and Beliefs and Edessa, Brill Archive, ISBN 90-04-06050-2
