= Prostyle =

Row of columns in front of a building

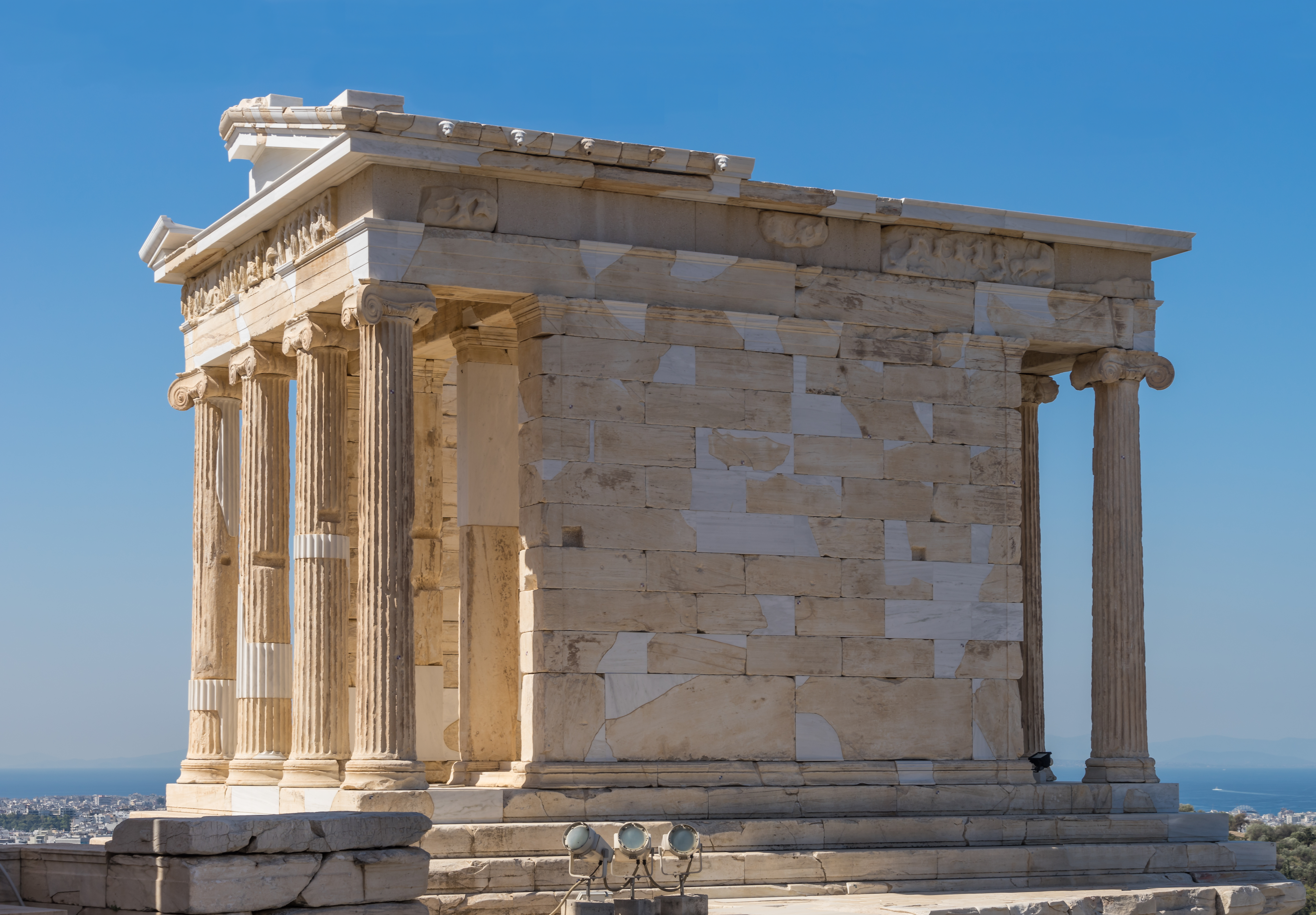
Northeast view of the Temple of Athena Nike, a prostyle temple (but also an amphiprostyle temple, since there is a row of columns at the back as well)

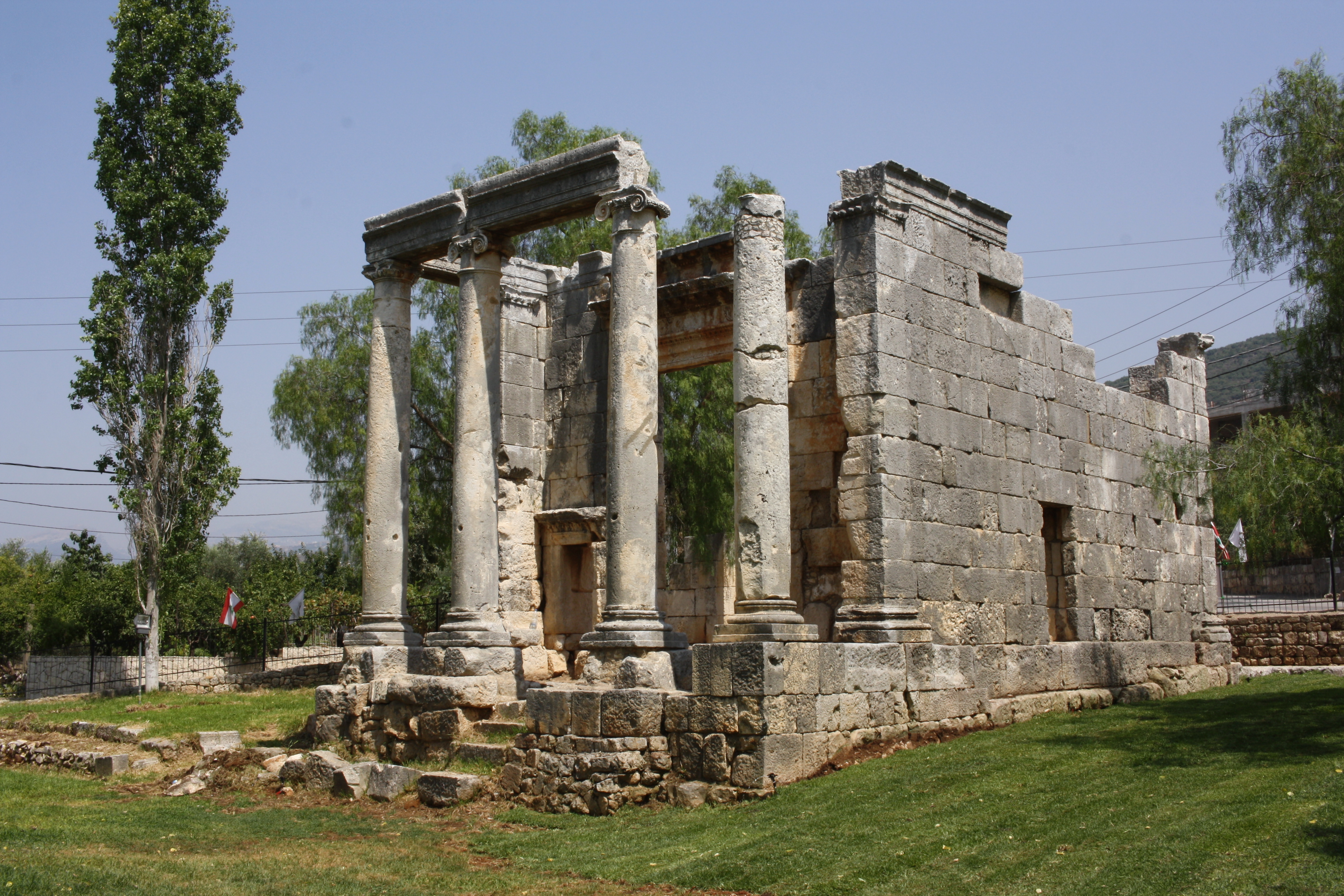
The Roman temple of Bziza, a tetrastyle prostyle temple

Prostyle and Prostylos (Greek: πρόστυλος), literally meaning "with columns in front", is an architectural term designating temples (especially Greek and Roman) featuring a row of columns on the front. The term is often used as an adjective when referring to the portico of a classical building, which projects from the main structure. First used in Etruscan and Greek temples, this motif was later incorporated by the Romans into their temples.

Examples of prostyle include the Temple of Athena Nike, Akropolis, Athens, a prostyle tetrastyle (i.e. with four columns). There are also prostyle hexastyle and prostyle octastyle temples.

This architectural element probably originated in the eastern Greek isles in the 8th century BC, but there are also many examples in archaic temples in southern Italy.

The subsequent evolution of temple design came with the amphiprostyle, where there are rows of columns both in front and at the back of the temple.
