= Thapsacus =

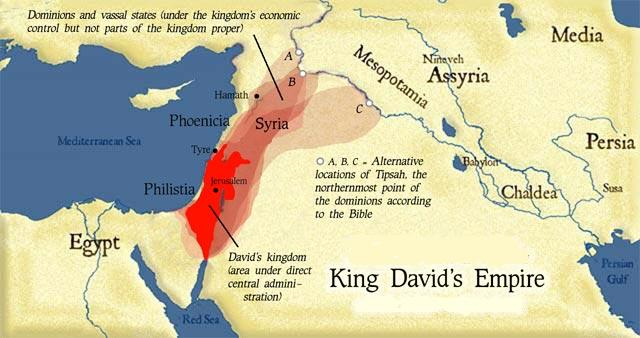
Map of area

Thapsacus (Ancient Greek: Θάψακος, romanized: Thapsakos; Hebrew: תִּפְסַח Tipsah) was an ancient town along the western bank of the Euphrates river that would now lie in modern Syria. Thapsacus was the Greek and Roman name for the town. The town was important and prosperous due to its river crossing, which allowed east-west land traffic to pass through it. Its precise location is unknown and there are several different locations identified as the site of Thapsacus. One possibility is a location close to Carchemish, which now lies in Turkey, on its border with Syria. Karkamış and Jarabulus are the closest modern towns in Turkey and Syria respectively. More recently it has been suggested that Thapsacus was renamed to Seleucia at the Zeugma, which lies further upstream on the Euphrates, or that it is identical with the Jebel Khalid, which lies a bit farther downstream on the river.

== Location ==
=== Possible identification with Carchemish ===
Farrell and Engels argue that Thapsacus was located in the vicinity of Carchemish. There are several classical sources which support this. The oldest source is the 401 BC marching itinerary of Cyrus the Younger as given by Xenophon, in his Anabasis. Farrell calculates that the march rates support a crossing at Carchemish, then across to the Balikh River and then down that river to its junction with the Euphrates. The Greek geographer Eratosthenes, who lived during the third and second century BC, gave a distance of 4,800 stades from Thapsacus to Babylon through the route along the Euphrates. This distance is 552 miles (888 km), which conforms to the actual distance of about 558 miles (898 km) between Carchemish and Babylon. Eratosthenes also gives a distance of 2,400 stades for the shortest route to the Tigris from Thapsacus. This distance is 276 miles (444 km), which is also the approximate distance as measured with modern techniques. Arrian writes that Alexander the Great kept the Euphrates and the Armenian mountains on his left after he crossed the Euphrates at Thapsacus in 331 BC. Engels interprets this as additional support for a location near Carchemish.

The city's identification with Carchemish is supported by its similar role. In neo-Assyrian times the city of Carchemish was the main crossing point on the Euphrates. For many centuries it had been the capital city of the major neo-Hittite kingdom in north-western Syria. Trade between east and west passed through it and because of this its system of weights and measures became a standard that was later adopted by the Assyrians and referred to as the Carchemish standard. This standard in trade with Syria (known as Ebir-nari, "across the river", in cuneiform texts) continued into neo-Babylonian and Persian times as illustrated by a letter from year 9 of Kuraš/Cyrus where this standard was then known as the measure of Tapsuḫu. The continued importance of the city is the reason Eratosthenes choose Thapsakos as one of the reference points for his system of latitude and longitude.

Thapsakos' identification with Europos (the Hellenistic name of Carchemish) finds some support from a corrupt passage in Plinius' Naturalis Historia. In his description of places along the Euphrates, from source to mouth, he gives the following account of the right bank of the Euphrates between Zeugma and Sura. "And in Syria [it flows past the following] towns: Europus formerly Thapsacus, now Amphipolis, the Tent-Dwelling Arabs. Thus it continues to the place called Sura". The passage reads as if there should be a list of towns and we know from classical references that there were other towns along this strip. In addition it is known that Amphipolis was different from Europus as Stephanos of Byzantine says it was called Tourmeda by the locals. One solution is to read the town list as "Europus formerly Thapsacus, ..., [Tourmeda] now Amphipolis, ..." (where the remaining towns have fallen out of the passage).

=== Other possible identifications ===
Gawlikowsi supports the identification of Thapsacus with Seleucia at the Zeugma, which is further upstream on the Euphrates.

Kramer has proposed an identification with Jebel Khalid and/or the river crossing next to the Jebel.

The town has also been linked with Dibsi Faraj and with the town of Balis in Halab district in Syria.

== References to Thapsacus ==
=== Classical References ===
- Thapsacus is mentioned in Xenophon's Anabasis as the a "large and prosperous city" where Cyrus the Younger's armies stayed five days and where Cyrus revealed to his generals that they would be marching on Babylon.
- Arrian's Anabasis of Alexander mentions that Darius Codomannus "made a forced march toward the city of Thapsacus and the river Euphrates" and later that Alexander arrived there to find two boat-bridges had been erected across the river. Anabasis of Alexander III.6.6 mentions that Alexander "was already starting inland toward Thapsacus and the River Euphrates."
- Strabo's Geographika states that there was a bridge over the Euphrates at Thapsacus, and postulates that the width of Mesopotamia may have been measured from this point to a bridge on the Tigris.
- Pliny the Elder's Naturalis Historia states that Thapsacus later became known as Amphipolis. In their 1855 translation of this text, John Bostock and Henry Thomas Riley note that Amphipolis' "ruins are to be seen at the ford of El Hamman, near the modern Rakkah."

=== Biblical references ===
There are two references to Tiphsah in the Bible, both of which are the subject of debate over whether or not they refer to Thapsacus:

- In 1 Kings 4:24, Tiphsah is mentioned as one of the boundaries of Solomon's dominions. Easton's Bible Dictionary holds that this is probably a reference to Thapsacus, but Hope W. Hogg in the Encyclopædia Britannica Eleventh Edition, related that "it is impossible to determine whether the one phrase 'from Tiphsah to Gaza', where the name seems to occur, is as early as the Persian Period: the Greek text is quite discrepant".
- Menahem, King of Israel, undertook an expedition and "smote Tiphsah and all that were therein" (2 Kings 15:16). Easton's states that this expedition implied a march of some 300–400 miles from Tirzah, apparently indicating their belief that this Tiphsah also refers to Thapsacus. They acknowledge, however, that some scholars identify this as a reference to Khurbet Tafsah, six miles west of Shechem. Hogg claimed that this verse "cannot possibly refer to any place on the Euphrates".

=== Babylonian References ===
- A town called Tapsuhu is mentioned in two Babylonian clay tablets dating in the reigns of Nabonidus and Cyrus the Great. It has recently been argued that it could be identified with Thapsacus.

=== Modern References ===
- Hogg noted that "after various attempts at identification, it has apparently been correctly identified by J. P. Peters (Nation, May 23, 1889) and B. Moritz (Sitz.-Ber. d. Berl. Akad., July 25, 1889). The name may survive in Kal'at Dibse, "a small ruin 8 m[iles] below Meskene, and 6 m[iles] below the ancient Barbalissus".

== Sources ==
- Arrian (1893). Chinnock, E. J. (ed.). Anabasis Alexandri.
- Engels, Donald W. (1980). Alexander the Great and the Logistics of the Greek Army. Berkeley and Los Angeles, California: University of California Press. ISBN 978-0-520-04272-8.
- Farrell, W. J. (1961). "A Revised Itinerary of the Route Followed by Cyrus the Younger through Syria, 401 B. C.". The Journal of Hellenic Studies. 81: 153–155. doi:10.2307/628085. JSTOR 628085.
- Gawlikowski, Michal (1996). "Thapsacus and Zeugma: The Crossing of the Euphrates in Antiquity". Iraq. 58: 123–133. doi:10.1017/S0021088900003223. JSTOR 4200424.
- Kramer, Norbert (2019). "Jebel Khalid, Gindaros & Co. Ein Diskussionsbeitrag zur Akkulturation im frühseleukidischen Kontext" [Jebel Khalid, Gindaros & Co. A contribution to the discussion on acculturation in the early Hellenistic context]. In Fouquet, Johannes; Herzog, Sarah; Meese, Karin; Wittenberg, Tim (eds.). Argonautica. Festschrift für Reinhard Stupperich. Marsberg/Padberg: Scriptorium. pp. 135–149. ISBN 978-3-932610-60-8.
- Strabo (1917). Jones, Horace Leonard (ed.). Geography. Vol. 1. Cambridge, Massachusetts: Harvard University Press. ISBN 9780674990555.
- Vailhé, Siméon (1909). "Europus" . In Herbermann, Charles (ed.). Catholic Encyclopedia. Vol. 5. New York: Robert Appleton Company.
- "Xenophon, Anabasis, Book 1, chapter 4, section 1". Perseus Digital Library.
- Strabo. "Anabasis of Alexander". Archived from the original on 2014-08-02.
- "Pliny the Elder, The Natural History, Book V. An Account of Countries, Nations, Seas, Towns, Hevens, Mountains, Rivers, Distances, and Peoples who now exit or formerly existed, Chap. 21—Syria upon the Euphrates". Perseus Digital Library.
- Graslin, L.; Lemaire, A. (February 2004). "Tapsuhu, Thapsaque?". NABU. 55. achemenet.com.
