= Temple of Adonis, Dura-Europos =

Coordinates: 34.747711°N 40.727486°E

This article contains information derived from colonial-era research, which requires critical reassessment. It is presently undergoing review by scholars engaged in contemporary interdisciplinary studies on this structure. (August, 2025)

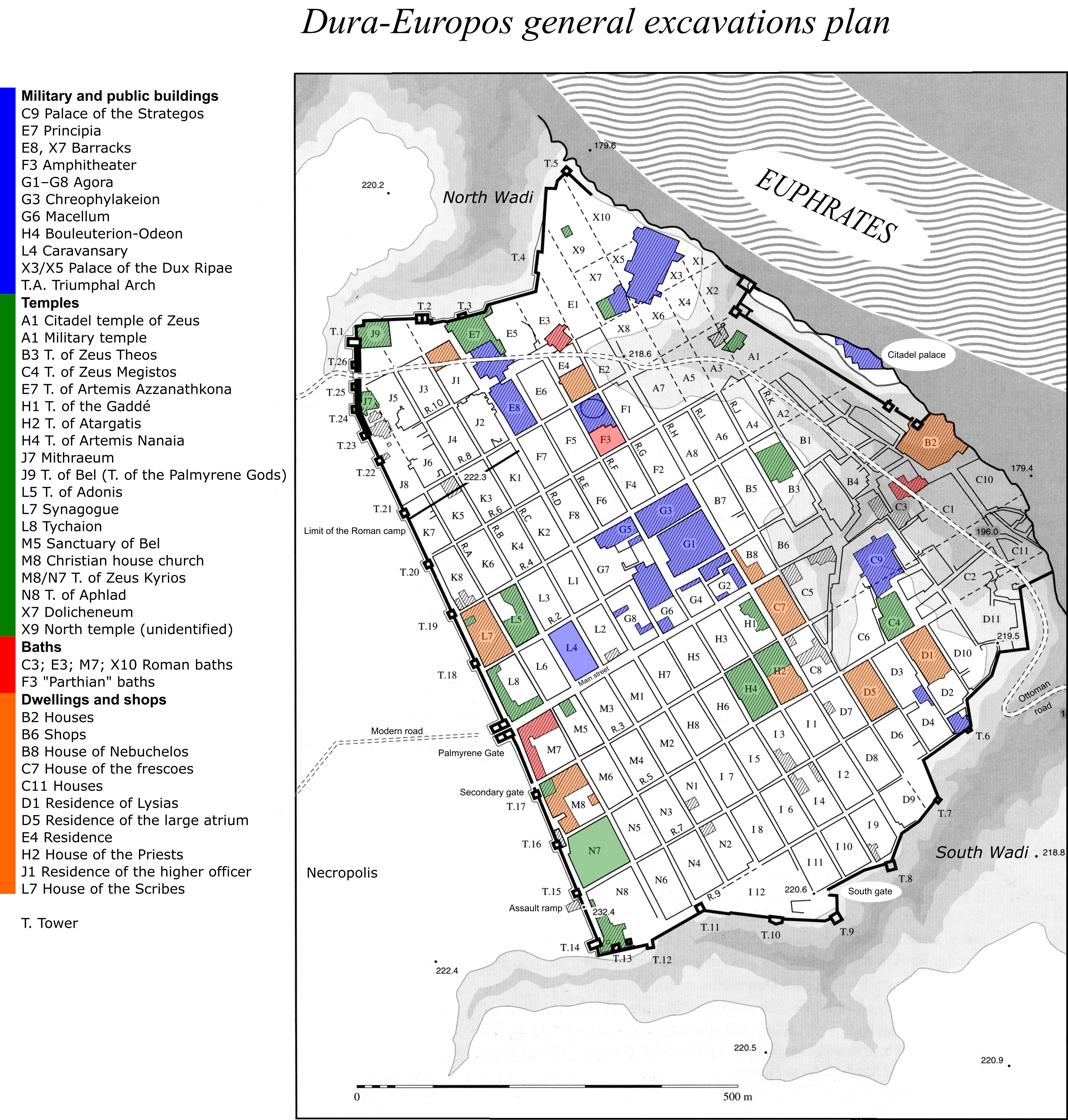
Dura-Europos general excavations plan, Temple of Adonis is marked as L5

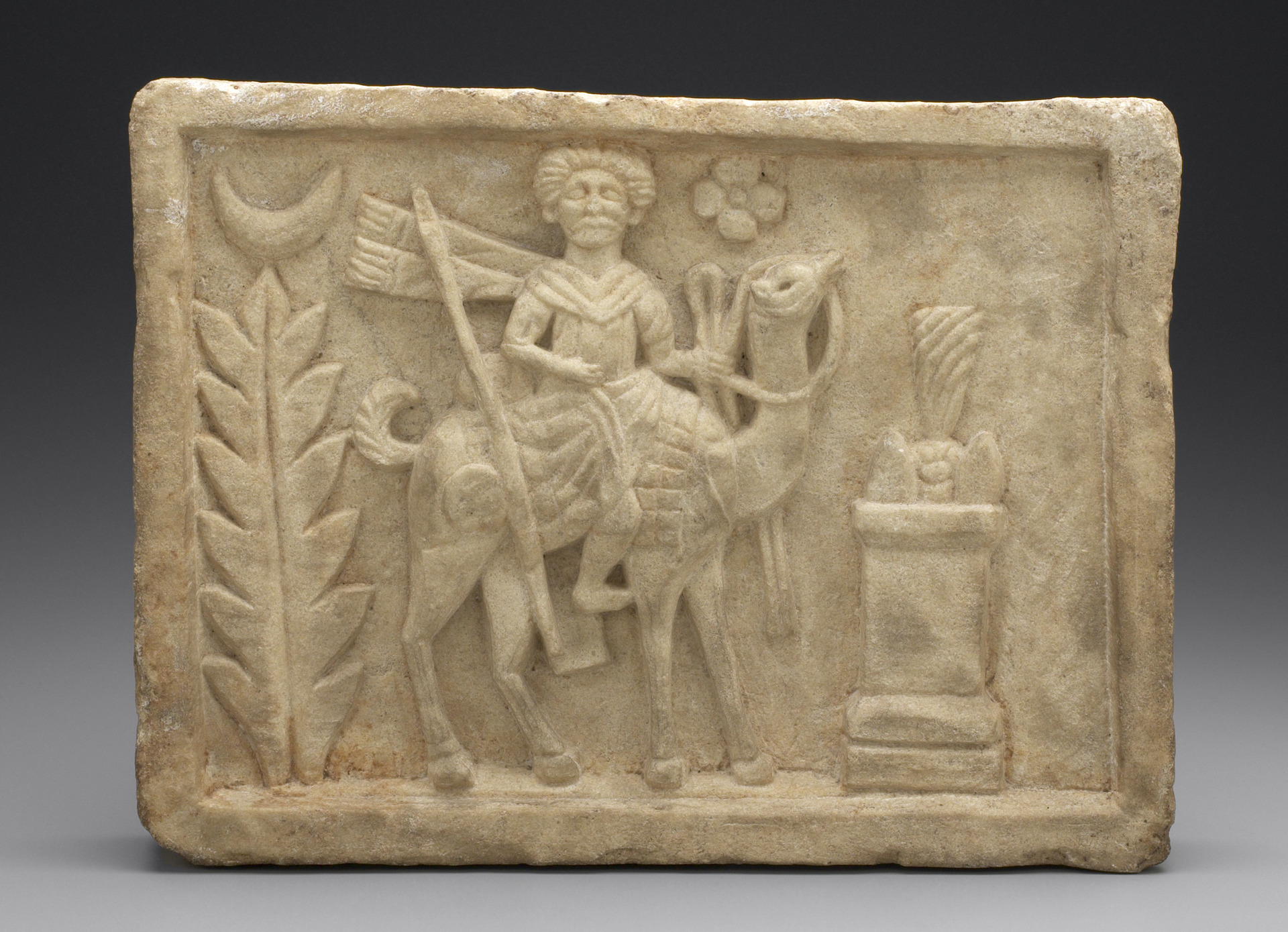
Relief with the god Arsu, from the temple of Adonis

The Temple of Adonis in Dura-Europos was discovered by a French-American expedition of Yale University led by Michael Rostovtzeff and was excavated between 1931 and 1934.

== Description ==
The temple complex was the last great temple of the city to be built under Parthian rule (113 BC – AD 165). It consists of a number of buildings grouped around a courtyard. It takes up half an insula (city block), with the surrounding residential buildings forming the boundaries of the temenos. Several different rooms with benches on all the walls were grouped around the courtyard. On the north side, there was a portico with two columns. Two reliefs were found here, one depicting either Atargatis or Tyche, and the other of the god Arsu riding a camel. The actual temple was located in the south and had consisted of a pronaos and the actual naos. Wall paintings which were discovered in a fragmentary state, depicted a state and a family making an offering to the god on a fire altar at left. The scene has been reconstructed.

== Inscriptions and history of the sanctuary ==
Several inscriptions found in the sanctuary make it possible to follow the history of the sanctuary in detail. It can be divided into two construction phases. Three inscriptions dating to AD 152, 152/152, and 157/158 mark the first phase. The oldest inscription (July or August 152) was located on the lintel of the door to the pronaos. It is not well preserved, but the dating is secure.

The main sanctuary was thus probably founded in AD 150. A second phase of construction took place in the years 175–182. On 24 September 175, Gorpiaeus Thaesamsus dedicated an altar with an inscription which explicitly named Adonis. In 181/182 (year 493 of the Seleucid era, which is employed by all the sanctuary's inscriptions), two people called Solaeas and Boubaues erected a peristyle and a wine cellar.

== Bibliography ==
- M. I. Rostovtzeff, F. E. Brown, C. B. Welles: The excavations at Dura-Europos: Preliminary Report of Seventh and Eighth Season of Work 1933–1934 and 1934–1935. Yale University Press, New Haven. 1939, pp. 135–175.
