= Jebel Khalid =

Archaeological site in modern Syria

Coordinates: 36°21′33″N 38°10′27″E

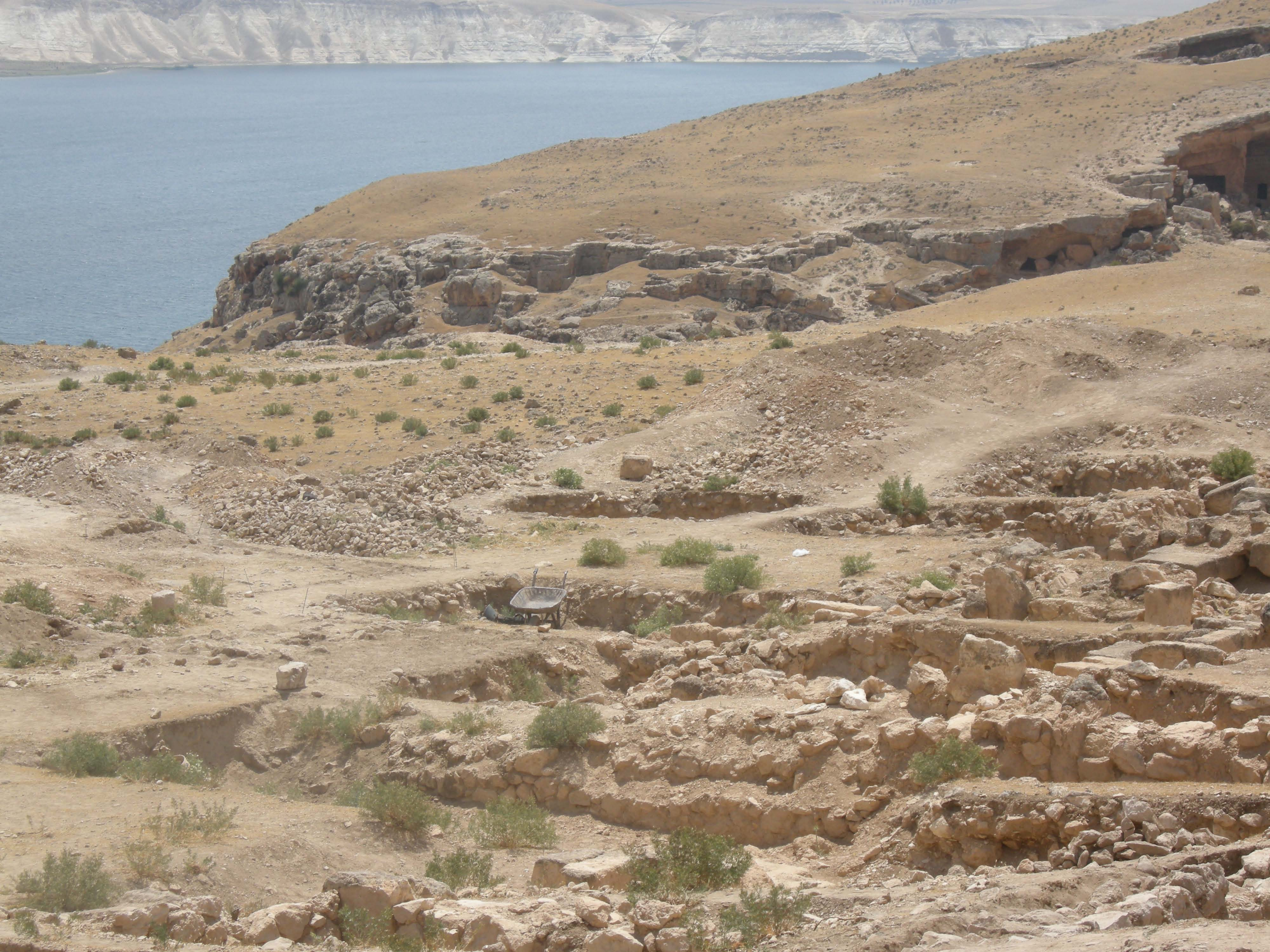
Jebel Khalid, excavations

Jebel Khalid is an archaeological site in modern Syria. Australian excavations starting in 1986 discovered the remains of a Hellenistic, Seleucid town perhaps founded by Seleucus I Nicator. The town flourished till around 70 BC and was then abandoned. The ancient name is not yet known for sure. Due to the political situation in Syria the excavations stopped in 2010.

The city stretches along the Euphrates and is surrounded by a wall, about 3.4 km long. Within the city wall are the remains of a governor's palace, a temple of the Amphiprostyle type and a palaestra. One insula was completely excavated. A second insula was partly uncovered. Outside the town wall were found the cemeteries of the inhabitants.

The governor's palace was built in the early stages of the city's history, in the 3rd century BC. It consists of a Doric peristyle courtyard surrounded by various rooms. The excavators assume that these rooms were most likely used as audience, banquet and storage rooms as well as kitchens, but this is not entirely certain – the north wing, for example, has also been interpreted as a residential area.

It is unknown which name Jebel Khalid bore in antiquity. Researchers have discussed as possibilities the place names Amphipolis and Thapsacus, both of which are known from written sources.

== Bibliography ==
Excavation reports

- G.W. Clarke: Jebel Khalid on the Euphrates: Report on Excavations 1986–1996, Eisenbrauns 2002, ISBN 978-0958026505
- Heather Jackson: Jebel Khalid on the Euphrates. Volume 2, The terracotta figurines, Sydney: MEDITARCH, 2002, ISBN 9780958026529
- Heather Jackson: Jebel Khalid on the Euphrates, Volume 3: The Pottery, Sydney: MEDITARCH, 2011, ISBN 9780958026536
- Heather Jackson: Jebel Khalid on the Euphrates, Volume 4, The housing insula, Sydney: MEDITARCH, 2014, ISBN 9780958026550
- G. Clarke, H. Jackson, C. E. V. Nixon, J. Tidmarsh, K. Wesselingh and L. Cougle-Jose: Jebel Khalid on the Euphrates, Volume 5: Report on Excavations 2000–2010. Mediterranean Archaeology supplement, 10. Sydney: MEDITARCH Publications; Sydney University Press, 2016, ISBN 9780958026574

Further literature

- Kramer, Norbert (2019). "Jebel Khalid, Gindaros & Co. Ein Diskussionsbeitrag zur Akkulturation im frühseleukidischen Kontext". In Fouquet, Johannes; Herzog, Sarah; Meese, Karin; Wittenberg, Tim (eds.). Argonautica. Festschrift für Reinhard Stupperich. Marsberg/Padberg: Scriptorium. pp. 135–149. ISBN 978-3-932610-60-8.
