= Lists of pairs =

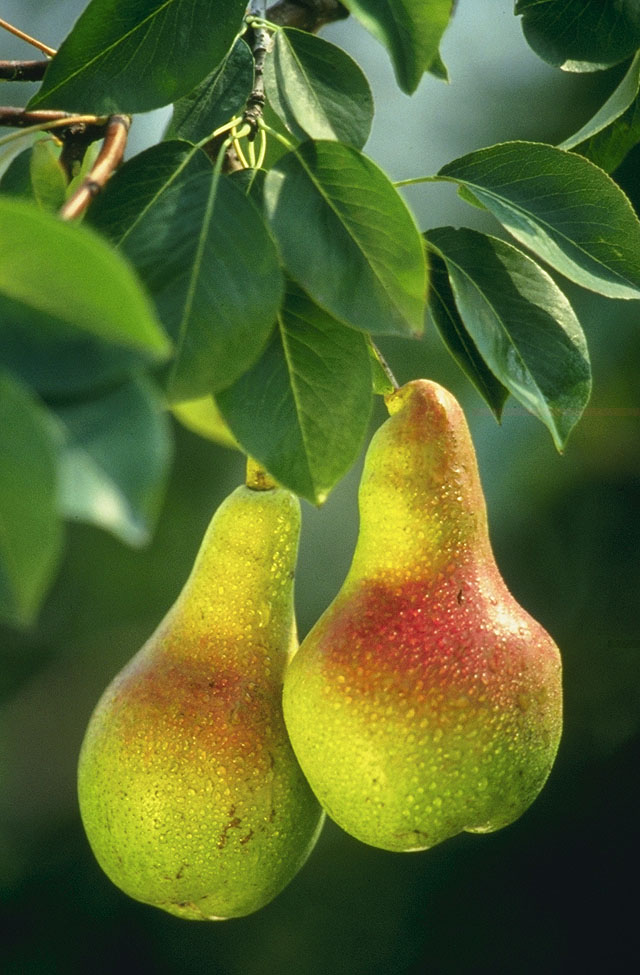
Pair of pears

These are lists of pairs by type.

== Family ==
- List of twins
- List of sibling pairs
- List of coupled cousins

== Places ==
- Lists of twin towns and sister cities

== Fiction ==
- List of fictional detective teams
- List of fictional supercouples
- List of mythological pairs

== See also ==
- Supercouple
