= Haubas =

Pre-Islamic deity of South Arabia

Haubas (or Hawbas) was a god worshiped in South Arabia in pre-Islamic times, especially Sheba.

Haubas is often mentioned in oracles and is the object of the advice solicited by the worshiper.
