= Anbay =

Pre-Islamic deity of South Arabia

Anbay (Qatabanian: 𐩱𐩬𐩨𐩺, romanized: ʾnby, ʾAnbāy) is a pre-Islamic deity who was originally worshipped in Qataban, in what is now Yemen. He was regarded as a deity of justice and an oracle, in attendance to the moon deity Amm. Anbay's name was invoked in a range of legal matters, from filing paperwork for the legal title of a building to the royal regulation of water supplies.

He is often mentioned together with Haukim, another god of justice.
