= Asira =

Pre-Islamic divinity worshipped in northern Arabia

Asira was a local god worshipped in pre-Islamic northern Arabia. He was revered at Taima and was strongly influenced by Egyptian culture. Asira was mentioned only in name by the Babylonian king Nabonidus.
