= Basamum =

Deity in pre-Islamic South Arabia

Basamum was a deity worshipped in pre-Islamic South Arabia. His name may be derived from the proto-Arabic basam, or balsam, a plant that was used in ancient medicines, indicating that he may have been a deity associated with healing or health. One ancient text referred to Basamum curing two sick goats or ibexes.
