= Sa'd (deity) =

Sa'd (Arabic: سعد) was a god of fortune in pre-Islamic Arabia revered by the Banu Kinanah tribe.

== Attestations ==
His cult image was a tall stone and was situated in the desert.

According to Ibn Ishaq, a man once visited this cult image with his many camels for blessings. Upon reaching the idol, which was blood-stained by the animal offerings of the time, the camels ran away. Angered, the man threw a stone at the idol, hoping that Allah will not bless the idol, and set out to find them. After all camels are gathered, he declared:

We came to Sa`d so he may unite us together,

But Sa`d disunited us, so we have nothing to do with Sa`d. Is Sa`d anything but a stone in a plain of land That calls for neither misguidance nor guidance?

The fifth Shia Imam, Muhammad al-Baqir narrated to his companion, Abdul Raheem al-Qaseer, that following the death of Muhammad, the people of Arabia reverted to old habits, leaving the "Helpers" (supporters of Islam) in isolation. They pledged allegiance to Sa'd, shouting slogans from the days of Jahiliyyah: "O Sa'd, you are the hope, and you are the vessel, and the solution!"
