= Yatha =

Ancient deity of present-day Yemen

Yathaʾ (Arabic: يثع, lit. 'Savior') is a pre-Islamic god worshiped by the Sabaeans and Hemyarites of Yemen. Nine kings have a theophoric name prefixed by Yathaʾ. The name may be an archaic equivalent to יֵ֫שַׁע (yesha – yeh'-shah), which is a masculine noun meaning "salvation." See Strong's Hebrew: 3468 for details.

Savior God. A Hemyaritic deity, to whom, in conjunction with the other local gods, a temple was erected in Abyan by Abd-shams-Aslam and his brother Marthad. He was the special guardian of the town of Aden, and his analogue was the Chaldean divinity Salman.
