= Al-Qaum =

Nabataean god of war

Al-Qaum (Arabic: القوم) was the Nabataean god of war and the night, and guardian of caravans. He was also known as the “Protector of the Clan.”

Large numbers of inscriptions bearing his name have been found, and archaeologists believe that he was a major god of the Nabataean pantheon. In order to fit in with western civilization, Al-Qaum was later associated with the Greek/Roman god Ares or Mars. As a night god, he protected the souls of the sleepers in the form of stars, accompanying them on their nightly journey through the heavenly realms, as well as guiding caravans in the desert by means of the stars.

== In popular culture ==
A black metal band in Saudi Arabia, Al-Namrood, uses this pantheon as inspiration for its music.

Al-Qaum is the name of one of the Exodan fleet spaceships in the 2018 novel Record of a Spaceborn Few by Becky Chambers.
