= Qaynan =

Qaynān was a god worshipped by the Sabaean people in pre-Islamic South Arabia. Based on etymology, Qaynān may have been the god of smiths.
