= Haukim =

Pre-Islamic Arabic god

Haukim is a pre-Islamic deity who was originally worshipped in Qataban, in what is now South Arabia. He was possibly concerned with arbitration and the law. He is often mentioned together with Anbay, another god of justice.
