= Dhat-Badan =

Himyarite goddess

Dhat-Badan (Sabaean: 𐩹𐩩𐩽𐩨𐩲𐩵𐩬), Dhat-hami, or Zat-Badar, ´She of the Wild Goats` and ´She of the Sanctuary', was a Himyarite goddess previously of the Saba' kingdom.

Dhat-Badan was a nature goddess of the oasis and the wet season worshipped at tree-circled pools throughout the region of ancient Yemen, Somalia, Eritrea and Ethiopia. She was the goddess of fertility and agriculture.

She was said to forbid any invocation to her when there was no seeress or priestess present in her sanctuary. This priestess was called a ḥlmt, literally 'Dreamer'. In the sanctuary, the priestess would lie down and sleep before the sacred tree(s) of the goddess to receive an oracle in the form of a prophetic dream, similar to the Celtic Druidism tarbhfeis.

She was a popular goddess of the polytheists of Axum. The she-ibex was sacred to her and it was said that an island in the Red Sea inhabited by ibexes was under her protection.
