= Ta'lab =

Moon god of ancient Yemen

Ta'lab (Old South Arabian: 𐩩𐩱𐩡𐩨) was a god worshipped in ancient Yemen, particularly by Sumʿay tribes. Ta'lab was the moon god and also a protector of pastures. The name Ta'lab means “goat”, an animal that was considered sacred by south Arabians. Ta'lab’s oracle was consulted for advice. A shrine dedicated to him existed in Jabal Riyam in north Sanaa.

== Gallery ==
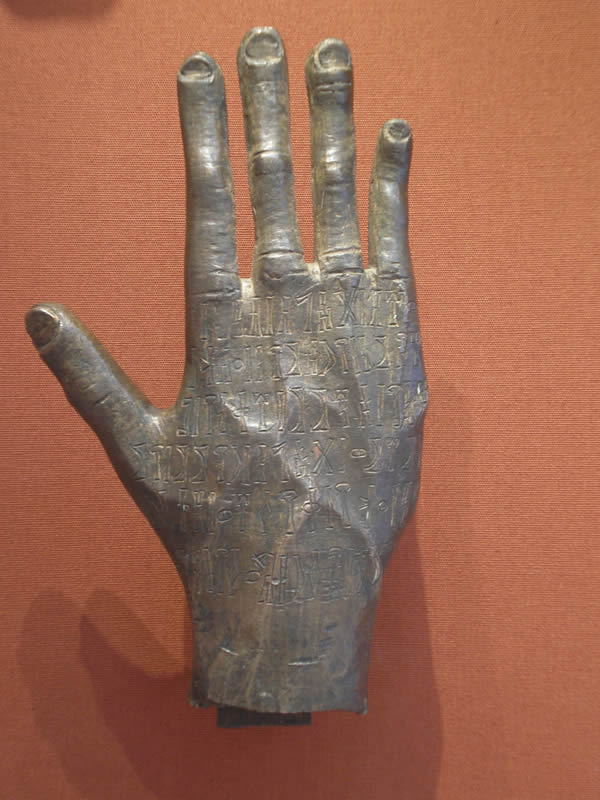
Bronze hand given by Wahb Ta'lab ibn Husman Yarsumi Bani Sukhim to Ta'lab Ryam, 2nd-3rd century CE.

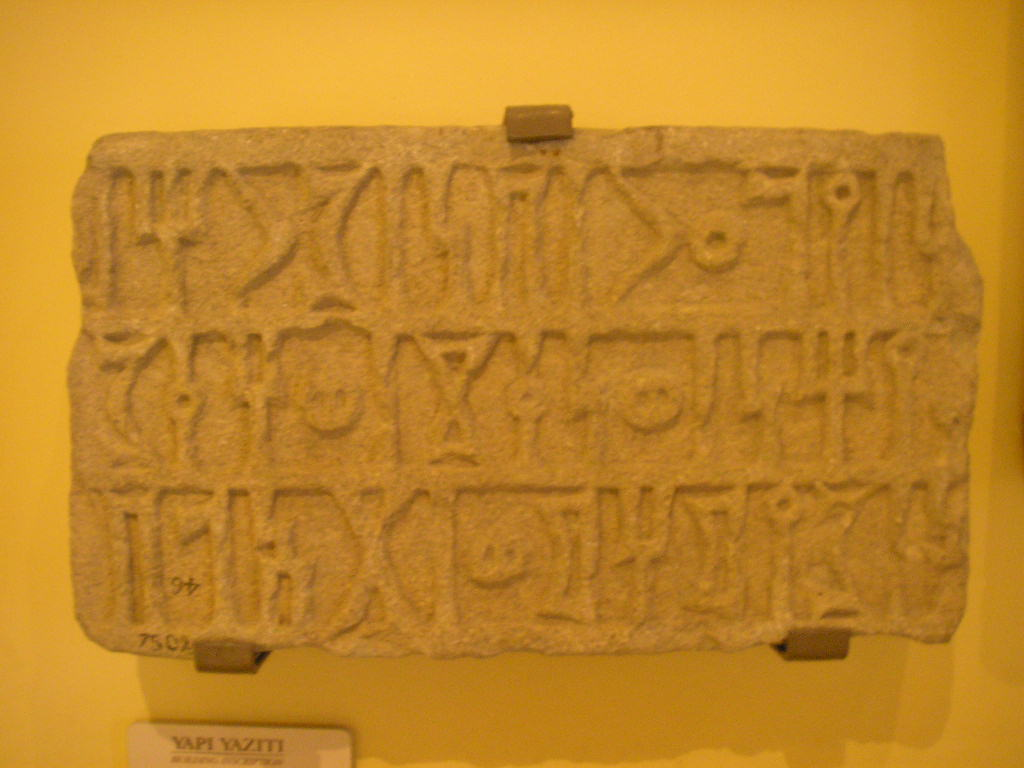
South Arabian inscription describing the construction of a temple dedicated to Ta'lab, 3rd century CE.
