= Azizos =

Palmyran Arab god

- God of the morning star
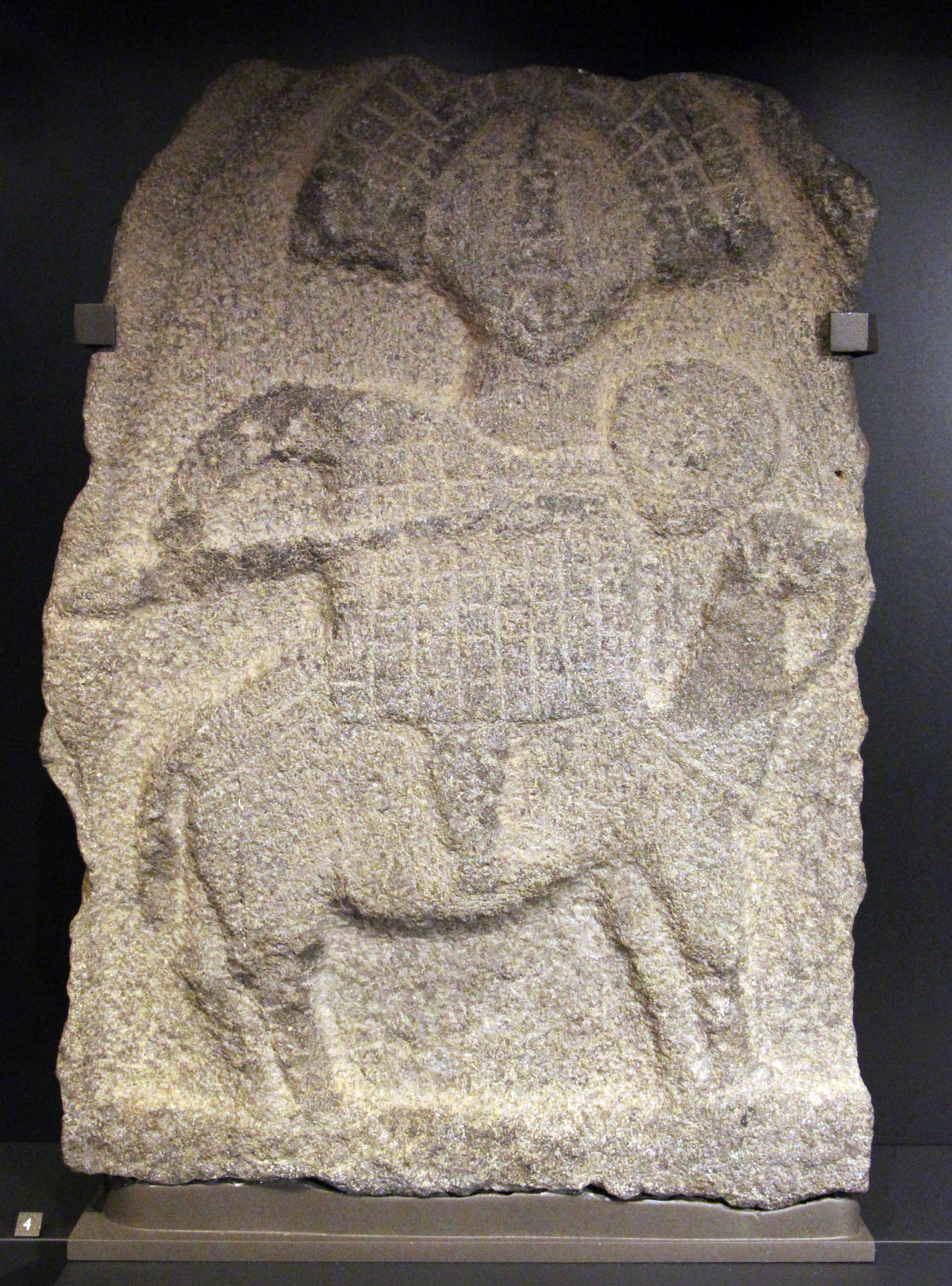
- Relief carving of Azizos riding a dromedary, from the region of Tell Halaf and Harran (1st–3rd century AD)
- Major cult center: Palmyra

Genealogy
- Siblings: Arsu

Equivalents
- Greek: Ares
- Roman: Mars

In ancient Arab mythology, Azizos or Aziz (Palmyrene: 𐡰𐡦𐡩𐡦 ʿzyz) is the Palmyran Arab god of the morning star. He is portrayed as riding a camel with his twin brother Arsu, although one source says that "Azizos is depicted as a horseman, whereas Arşu is a cameleer." He was venerated separately in Syria as god of the morning star, Phosphoros, in company with the astral god Monimos, Hesperos.

Azizos was identified as Ares by Julian in his work 'Hymn to King Helios'. He says "Now I am aware that Ares, who is called Azizos by the Syrians who inhabit Emesa..."

== See also ==
- Roman temple of Bziza

== Sources ==
- Encyclopedia of Gods, Michael Jordan, Kyle Cathie Limited, 2002
