= Arsu =

Ancient deity from Syria and Arabia

- God of the evening star
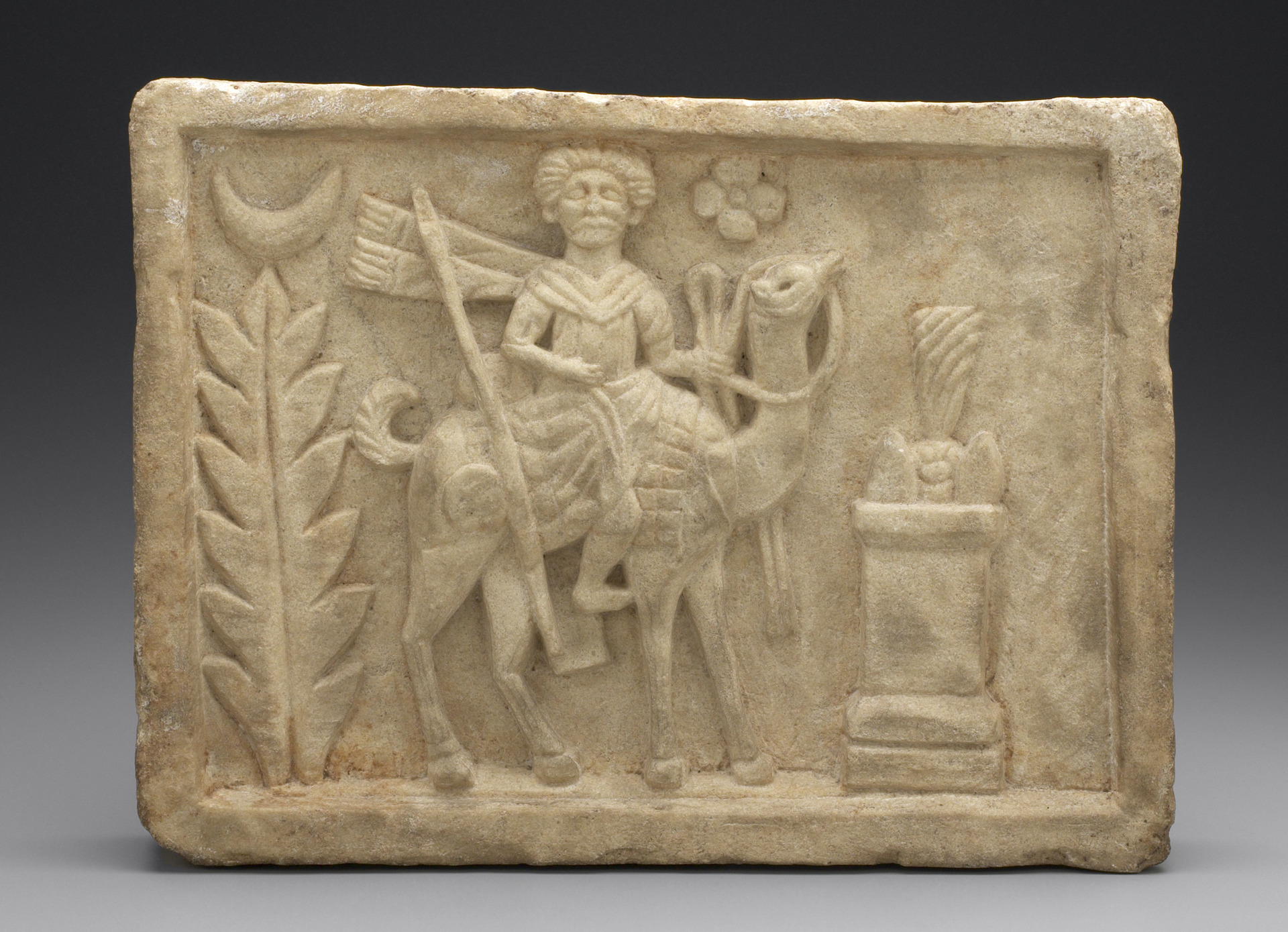
- Relief showing Arsu from Temple of Adonis, Dura-Europos
- Planet: Mercury, Venus (as the Evening Star)

Genealogy
- Siblings: Azizos

Equivalents
- Arabia: Ruda

Arsu was a god worshipped in Palmyra, Syria.

A deity known from Syrian and northern Arabian lands, being represented as either male or female (most often). Arsu was connected with the evening star.

Frequently portrayed as riding a camel and accompanied by his twin brother Azizos; both were regarded as the protectors of caravans. His worship is also confirmed by material evidence found in the Temple of Adonis, Dura-Europos. In the temple complex there was a relief depicting Arsu on a camel. The inscription under the figure reads: "Oga the sculptor has made (this to) 'Arsu the camel-rider, for the life of his son". It is likely he was associated with the planet Mercury early on.

Elsewhere in pre-Islamic Arabia, he was equated with Ruda (literally benign).
