= List of characters and names mentioned in the Quran =

This is a list of things mentioned in the Quran. ISO 233 is used for the Romanization of Arabic words. The count is based on the Qira'at of Hafs from 'Asim.

== Theological entities ==
=== God ===
- Allāh (ٱللَّٰه, "The God") — Mentioned 2,699 times.
  - Names and attributes of Allah found in the Quran

=== Angels ===
- Malāʾikah (مَلَائِكَة, Angels) — Mentioned 68 times (singular and plural).

==== Archangels ====
- Jibrīl (جِبْرِيل, Gabriel) — Mentioned by name 3 times (2:97, 2:98, 66:4).
  - Ar-Rūḥ al-Amīn (ٱلرُّوح الْأَمِين, "The Trustworthy Spirit") — (26:193).
  - Ar-Rūḥ al-Qudus (ٱلرُّوح الْقُدُس, "The Holy Spirit") — (2:87, 2:253, 5:110, 16:102).
  - Rasūlin Karīm (رَسُولٍ كَرِيمٍ, "Noble Messenger") — (81:19).
  - Dhī Quwwah (ذِي قُوَّةٍ, "Possessor of Power") — (81:20).
- Mīkāl (مِيكَال, Michael) — Mentioned 1 time (2:98).
- Malak al-Mawt (مَلَكُ الْمَوْت, "Angel of Death") — Mentioned 1 time (32:11).
- The Angel of the Trumpet — Referred to by the act of blowing the Ṣūr (Trumpet) (18:99, 20:102, 39:68). Identified in tradition as Isrāfīl.

==== Angelic Groups and Individuals ====
- Al-Malaʾ al-Aʿlā (الْمَلَأِ الْأَعْلَى, "The Exalted Assembly") — The highest ranks of angels (37:8, 38:69).
- Hārūt and Mārūt (هَارُوت وَمَارُوت) — Two angels sent to Babylon as a trial (2:102).
- Kirāman Kātibīn (كِرَامًا كَاتِبِينَ, "Honourable Scribes") — Angels recording human deeds (82:11).
  - Referred to as al-Mutalaqqiyān (الْمُتَلَقِّيَان, "The Two Receivers") sitting on the right and left (50:17–18).
- Mālik (مَالِك) — The primary guardian of Hell (43:77).
- Zabāniyah (زَبَانِيَة) — The angels of punishment in Hell (96:18).
  - Referred to as the nineteen guardians of the Fire (74:30–31).
- Bearers of the Throne (حَمَلَة الْعَرْش) — Angels who carry the Throne of Allah (40:7, 69:17).
- Al-Muʿaqqibāt (الْمُعَقِّبَات, "The Successive ones") — Guardian angels (13:11).

=== Jinn and Spirits ===
- Jinn (جِنّ) — Mentioned 22 times as Jinn and 7 times as Jānn.
- ʿIfrīt (عِفْرِيت) — A powerful class of Jinn; one is mentioned in the court of Solomon (27:39).
- Qarīn (قَرِين, "Companion") — A spiritual double or witness assigned to a person (43:36, 50:23, 50:27).

=== Devils ===
- Shayāṭīn (شَيَاطِين, Demons or Devils) — Mentioned 88 times (68 plural, 20 singular Shaṭān).
  - Iblīs (إِبْلِيس, the (chief) Devil) — Mentioned by name 11 times.
  - Mārid (مَارِد, "Rebellious one") — A type of evil devil (37:7).

=== Other spiritual beings ===
- Ghilmān (غِلْمَان) or Wildān (وِلْدَان) — Perpetually youthful attendants in Paradise (52:24, 56:17, 76:19).
- Ḥūr (حُور) — Pure companions in Paradise (44:54, 52:20, 55:72, 56:22).

== Animals ==
=== General Animals ===
- Ants (Naml, نَمْل) — Mentioned 3 times (27:17, 27:18); subject of Surah 27.
- Apes (Qiradah, قِرَدَة) — Mentioned 3 times (2:65, 5:60, 7:166).
- Bees (Naḥl, نَحْل) — Mentioned in 16:68; subject of Surah 16.
- Birds (Ṭayr, طَيْر) — Mentioned 34 times.
  - Includes the birds of Abraham (2:260) and the birds of Jesus (3:49).
  - Abābīl (أَبَابِيل) — Special flocks of birds mentioned in 105:3.
- Camels — Mentioned as Ibil (6:144, 88:17), Baʿīr (12:65, 12:72), and Jamal (7:40).
- Cattle / Livestock (Anʿām, أَنْعَام) — Mentioned 32 times.
  - Cow (Baqarah, بَقَرَة) — (2:67, 12:43).
  - Sheep / Ewes (Ḍaʾn / Naʿjah, ضَأْن / نَعْجَة) — (6:143, 38:23).
  - Goats (Maʿz, مَعْز) — (6:143).
- Crow (Ghurāb, غُرَاب) — Mentioned 2 times in 5:31, in the story of the sons of Adam.
- Dog (Kalb, كَلْب) — Mentioned 5 times. Notable is the dog of the Seven Sleepers (18:18, 18:22).
- Donkey (Ḥimār, حِمَار) — Mentioned 5 times (including plural Ḥumur). (2:259, 31:19, 62:5, 74:50).
- Elephant (Fīl, فِيل) — Mentioned 1 time (105:1).
- Fish (Ḥūt, حُوت) — Mentioned 6 times (singular and plural). Used for the fish of Moses (18:61) and the general provision of the sea (5:96, 7:163).
- Fly (Dhubāb, ذُبَاب) — Mentioned 1 time (22:73).
- Frogs (Ḍafādiʿ, ضَفَادِع) — Mentioned 1 time (7:133).
- Gnat / Mosquito (Baʿūḍah, بَعُوضَة) — Mentioned 1 time (2:26).
- Hoopoe (Hud-hud, هُدْهُد) — Mentioned in 27:20 in the story of Solomon.
- Horses (Khayl, خَيْل) — Mentioned 6 times (3:14, 8:60, 16:8, 17:64, 38:31, 59:6).
- Lion (Qaswarah, قَسْوَرَة) — Mentioned 1 time (74:51).
- Locusts (Jarād, جَرَاد) — Mentioned 2 times (7:133, 54:7).
- Lice (Qummal, قُمَّل) — Mentioned 1 time (7:133).
- Moths (Farāsh, فَرَاش) — Mentioned 1 time (101:4) as a metaphor for humanity on the Day of Judgment.
- Mules (Bighāl, بِغَال) — Mentioned 1 time (16:8).
- Pig / Swine (Khinzīr, خِنْزِير) — Mentioned 5 times (2:173, 5:3, 5:60, 6:145, 16:115).
- Quail (Salwā, سَلْوَى) — Mentioned 3 times (2:57, 7:160, 20:80).
- Snake / Serpent (Ḥayyah / Thuʿbān, حَيَّة / ثُعْبَان) — Mentioned 5 times (20:20, 7:107, 26:32, 27:10, 28:31) regarding the Staff of Moses.
- Spider (ʿAnkabūt, عَنْكَبُوت) — Mentioned 2 times in 29:41; subject of Surah 29.
- Wolf (Dhiʾb, ذِئْب) — Mentioned 3 times (12:13, 12:14, 12:17) in the story of Joseph.

=== Unique and Miraculous Entities ===
- Beast from the Earth (Dābbat min al-Arḍ, دَابَّةُ مِّنَ الْأَرْض) — An apocalyptic creature mentioned in 27:82.
- She-Camel of God (Nāqat Allāh, نَاقَةُ اللَّه) — The miraculous she-camel sent to the people of Thamud as a sign (7:73, 11:64, 26:155, 54:27, 91:13).
- The Ant of Solomon (Namlah, نَمْلَة) — A specific female ant that warned its colony (27:18).
- The Creature of the Staff (دَابَّةُ الْأَرْض, Dābbat al-Arḍ, 'Beast of the Earth') — The creature that consumed Solomon's staff, leading to the discovery of his death (34:14). Traditionally identified as a termite or woodworm (arḍah).
- The Companion of the Fish (al-Nūn, ٱلنُّون) — Refers to the great fish/whale of Jonah. The term Nūn appears in 68:1 and in the title Dhūn-Nūn (21:87).

== Prophets and Messengers ==
Prophets (Anbiyāʾ) and Messengers (Rusul) specifically mentioned by name in the Quran:

- Adam (آدَم) — Mentioned 25 times.
- Idrīs (إِدْرِيس, Enoch) — Mentioned 2 times.
- Nūḥ (نُوح, Noah) — Mentioned 43 times.
  - ʿAbdan Shakūrā (عَبْدًا شَكُورًا, "A Grateful Servant") — (17:3).
- Hūd (هُود) — Mentioned 7 times.
- Ṣāliḥ (صَالِح) — Mentioned 9 times.
- Ibrāhīm (إِبْرَاهِيم, Abraham) — Mentioned 69 times.
  - Khalīl Allāh (خَلِيلُ اللَّهِ, "Friend of Allah") — (4:125).
  - Imām (إِمَام, "A Leader") — (2:124).
  - Ḥanīf (حَنِيف, "Monotheist") — (3:67).
- Lūṭ (لُوط, Lot) — Mentioned 27 times.
- Ismāʿīl (إِسْمَاعِيل, Ishmael) — Mentioned 12 times.
  - Ṣādiq al-Waʿd (صَادِقَ الْوَعْدِ, "True to the Promise") — (19:54).
- Isḥāq (إِسْحَاق, Isaac) — Mentioned 17 times.
- Yaʿqūb (يَعْقُوب, Jacob) — Mentioned 16 times.
  - Isrāʾīl (إِسْرَائِيل) — (3:93, 19:58).
- Yūsuf (يُوسُف, Joseph) — Mentioned 27 times.
- Ayyūb (أَيُّوب, Job) — Mentioned 4 times.
- Shuʿayb (شُعَيْب, Jethro) — Mentioned 11 times.
- Mūsā (مُوسَى, Moses) — Mentioned 136 times.
  - Kalīm Allāh (كَلِيمُ اللَّهِ, "He to whom Allah spoke") — (Referred to in 4:164).
  - Rasūlan Nabiyyā (رَسُولًا نَبِيًّا, "A Messenger and a Prophet") — (19:51).
- Hārūn (هَارُون, Aaron) — Mentioned 20 times.
- Dāwūd (دَاوُد, David) — Mentioned 16 times.
  - Khalīfah (خَلِيفَة, "Vicegerent/Successor") — (38:26).
- Sulaymān (سُلَيْمَان, Solomon) — Mentioned 17 times.
- Ilyās (إِلْيَاس, Elijah) — Mentioned 2 times.
- al-Yasaʿ (الْيَسَع, Elisha) — Mentioned 2 times.
- Yūnus (يُونُس, Jonah) — Mentioned 4 times.
  - Dhūn-Nūn (ذُو النُّون, "He of the Fish") — (21:87).
  - Ṣāḥib al-Ḥūt (صَاحِبِ الْحُوت, "The Companion of the Fish") — (68:48).
- Zakariyyā (زَكَرِيَّا, Zechariah) — Mentioned 7 times.
- Yaḥyā (يَحْيَى, John) — Mentioned 5 times.
- ʿĪsā (عِيسَى, Jesus) — Mentioned 25 times.
  - al-Masīḥ (الْمَسِيح, "The Messiah") — (3:45).
  - Ibn Maryam (ابْن مَرْيَم, "Son of Mary") — (2:87).
  - Kalimatuhū (كَلِمَتُهُ, "His Word") — (4:171).
  - Rūḥun minhu (رُوحٌ مِنْهُ, "A Spirit from Him") — (4:171).
  - Rasūl Allāh (رَسُولُ اللَّهِ, "Messenger of Allah") — (4:157, 61:6).
- Muhammad (مُحَمَّد) — Mentioned 4 times by the name Muḥammad (3:144, 33:40, 47:2, 48:29).
  - Aḥmad (أَحْمَد) — Mentioned 1 time (61:6).
  - Rasūl Allāh (رَسُولُ اللَّهِ, "Messenger of Allah") — (33:40).
  - Khātam an-Nabiyyīn (خَاتَمَ النَّبِيِّينَ, "Seal of the Prophets") — (33:40).
  - an-Nabī al-Ummī (النَّبِيَّ الْأُمِّيَّ, "The Unlettered Prophet") — (7:157).

=== Other Figures of Saintly Status ===
Individuals mentioned by name in the Quran whose status as a Prophet (Nabī) is a matter of scholarly debate, or who are identified as exceptionally righteous servants:

- Maryam (مَرْيَم, Mary) — Mentioned by name 34 times; the only woman named in the Quran.
  - Siddīqah (صِدِّيقَة, "Truthful/Believer") — (5:75).
  - Iṣṭafāki (اصْطَفَاكِ, "The Chosen One") — (3:42).
- Dhul-Kifl (ذُو الْكِفْل) — Mentioned 2 times (21:85, 38:48).
- Dhul-Qarnayn (ذُو الْقَرْنَيْن) — Mentioned 3 times (18:83, 18:86, 18:94). A righteous king and traveler.
- Luqman (لُقْمَان) — Mentioned 2 times (31:12, 31:13). A sage known for his wisdom.
- Uzair (عُزَيْر, Ezra) — Mentioned 1 time (9:30).
- Talut (طَالُوت, Saul) — Mentioned 2 times (2:247, 2:249). The king of the Israelites.
- ʿImrān (عِمْرَان, Joachim/Amram) — Mentioned 3 times (3:33, 3:35, 66:12).
  - Āla ʿImrān (آلَ عِمْرَان, "The Family of Imran") — (3:33).

=== Implicitly Mentioned Figures ===
Figures referred to by their role or description, but not by their specific name:

- Khidr — Referred to as "a servant of Our servants" (18:65).
- Yūshaʿ ibn Nūn (Joshua) — Referred to as the "youth" (Fatā) companion of Moses (18:60).
- Samuel — Referred to as a "Prophet" to the Israelites (2:246).
- Kaleb — Referred to as one of "two men" who feared Allah (5:23).

== Contemporaries and Relatives of the Prophets ==
=== Relatives of the Prophets ===
- Wife of Adam (Ḥawwāʾ) — (2:35, 7:19, 20:117).
- Sons of Adam (Hābīl and Qābīl) — (5:27–31).
- Wife of Nūḥ (Wā'ilah) — A disbeliever (66:10).
- Son of Nūḥ (Yam or Kan'an) — (11:42–43).
- Father of Ibrāhīm (Āzar, آزَرَ) — (6:74).
- Wife of Lūṭ (Wālihah) — A disbeliever (11:81, 66:10).
- Family of Yūsuf:
  - Brothers of Yūsuf — The eleven brothers (12:4–18).
  - Parents of Yūsuf — (12:99–100).
- Family of Mūsā:
  - Mother of Mūsā (Yūkābid) — (20:38, 28:7).
  - Sister of Mūsā (Maryam) — (28:11–12).
  - Wife of Mūsā (Ṣaffūrah) — (28:23–27).
- Wife of Zakariyyā (Al-Yashbiʿ) — (3:40, 21:90).
- Mothers of the Believers (Ummahāt al-Muʾminīn) — (33:6).
- Zayd ibn Harithah (زَيْد) — (33:37).

=== Righteous Believers and Allies ===
- Queen of Sheba (Bilqīs) — The ruler who converted after meeting Solomon (27:22–44).
- Wife of Pharaoh (Āsiyá) — (28:9, 66:11).
- The Disciples (al-Ḥawāriyyūn, الْحَوَارِيُّونَ) — The followers of Jesus (3:52, 5:111, 61:14).
- The Believer of Ya-Sin — (36:20–27).
- Believer of the People of Pharaoh — (40:28–45).
- The One with Knowledge of the Book — (27:40).
- The King of Egypt (al-Malik, الْمَلِك) — The ruler during Joseph's time (12:43, 12:50, 12:54, 12:72, 12:76).
- The Man from the Outskirts — Who warned Moses to flee Egypt (28:20).
- The Two Prison Companions — Who Joseph interpreted dreams for (12:36–41).

=== Opponents of the Prophets ===
- Firʿawn (Pharaoh) — (Mentioned 74 times).
- Hāmān — Pharaoh's high official (28:6, 28:38).
- Qārūn (Korah) — (28:76–82).
- As-Samiri (السَّامِرِيّ) — The man who led the Israelites to idolatry in Moses' absence (20:85, 20:87, 20:95).
- Jālūt (Goliath) — (2:249–251).
- The King who argued with Abraham (Numrūd) — (2:258).
- Wife of the ʿAzīz (Zulaykhah) — (12:23–32).
- The Slayers of Ṣāliḥ's She-Camel — Referred to by their act of hamstringing the camel (7:77, 11:65, 54:29, 91:14). Qaddar ibn Sālif is traditionally identified as the chief perpetrator (91:12).
- Abu Lahab — (111:1).
- Wife of Abu Lahab — (111:4).

== Groups and Collectives ==
=== Nations and Tribes ===
- Ar-Rūm (الرُّوم, "The Romans/Byzantines") — (30:2).
- Quraysh (قُرَيْش) — (106:1).
- ʿĀd (عَاد) — The people of Hūd (7:65, 46:21).
- Thamūd (ثَمُود) — The people of Ṣāliḥ (7:73, 11:61).
  - Referred to as Aṣḥāb al-Ḥijr (أَصْحَابُ الْحِجْر) — (15:80).
- Banī Isrāʾīl (بَنِي إِسْرَائِيل) — Mentioned 43 times.
- Madyan (مَدْيَن) — (7:85).
  - Referred to as Aṣḥāb al-Aykah (أَصْحَابُ الْأَيْكَة) — (15:78).
  - Referred to as Aṣḥāb Madyan (أَصْحَابُ مَدْيَن) — (9:70, 22:44).
- Saba (سَبَأ, Sheba) — (27:22, 34:15).
- Yaʾjūj wa Maʾjūj (يَأْجُوجَ وَمَأْجُوجَ) — (18:94, 21:96).
- People of Tubba (قَوْمُ تُبَّع) — (44:37, 50:14).
- Qawm Nūḥ (قَوْمُ نُوح, "People of Noah") — (7:59, 11:25).
- Qawm Ibrāhīm (قَوْمُ إِبْرَاهِيم, "People of Abraham") — (9:70, 22:42).
- Qawm Lūṭ (قَوْمُ لُوط, "People of Lot") — (11:89).
  - Referred to as Al-Muʾtafikāt (الْمُؤْتَفِكَات, "The Overthrown Cities") — (9:70, 69:9).
- Al-Jabbārīn (الْجَبَّارِينَ, "The Tyrants") — The formidable people encountered by the Israelites (5:22).

=== Religious and Socio-Political Groups ===
- People of the Book (Ahl al-Kitāb, أَهْلَ الْكِتَاب) — (3:64, 5:68).
- Jews (al-Yahūd, الْيَهُود) — (2:113, 9:30).
  - Referred to as Hādū (هَادُوا) — (2:62, 6:146).
- Christians (an-Naṣārā, النَّصَارَى) — (2:62, 5:14).
- Sabians (aṣ-Ṣābiʾīn, الصَّابِئِينَ) — (2:62, 22:17).
- Magians (al-Majūs, الْمَجُوس) — (22:17).
- Muslims (al-Muslimūn, الْمُسْلِمُونَ) — (3:64, 22:78).
  - Referred to as Ummah Wasat (أُمَّةً وَسَطًا, "The Middle/Just Nation") — (2:143).
- Al-Anṣār (الْأَنْصَار) — (9:100).
- Al-Muhājirūn (الْمُهَاجِرِينَ) — (9:100).
- Ahl al-Bayt (أَهْلَ الْبَيْت) — (11:73, 33:33).
- Al-Munāfiqūn (الْمُنَافِقُونَ, "The Hypocrites") — (4:145, 63:1).
- Al-Kāfirūn (الْكَافِرُونَ, "The Disbelievers") — (2:250, 109:1).
- Al-Mushrikūn (الْمُشْرِكُونَ, "The Polytheists") — (9:1, 98:1).
- Al-Aʿrāb (الْأَعْرَاب, "The Desert Arabs") — (9:97, 48:11).
- Al-Malaʾ (الْمَلَأ, "The Chiefs/Elite") — The ruling class that often opposed the Prophets (7:60, 23:24, 28:38).
- Al-Mustaḍʿafūn (الْمُسْتَضْعَفُونَ, "The Oppressed") — (4:75, 28:5).

=== Narrative and Eschatological Collectives ===
- Companions of the Cave (Aṣḥāb al-Kahf) — (18:9).
  - Al-Raqīm (الرَّقِيم) — (18:9).
- Companions of the Elephant (Aṣḥāb al-Fīl) — (105:1).
- Al-Aḥzāb (الْأَحْزَاب, "The Confederates") — (33:20, 38:13).
- People of the Ditch (Aṣḥāb al-Ukhdūd) — (85:4).
- Companions of the Rass (Aṣḥāb ar-Rass) — (25:38).
- Sabbath-breakers (Aṣḥāb as-Sabt) — (2:65).
- People of the Town (Aṣḥāb al-Qaryah) — (36:13).
- Aṣḥāb al-Aʿrāf (أَصْحَابُ الْأَعْرَاف) — (7:46).
- Aṣḥāb al-Jannah (أَصْحَابُ الْجَنَّة, "Companions of the Garden") —
  - The dwellers of Paradise (2:82, 7:42).
  - The owners of the blighted garden in Surah Al-Qalam (68:17).
- Aṣḥāb an-Nār (أَصْحَابُ النَّار, "Companions of the Fire") — (2:39, 7:44).
- Aṣḥāb al-Maymanah & al-Mash'amah — (56:8–9).
- As-Sābiqūn (السَّابِقُونَ, "The Foremost") — (56:10).
- Al-Muqarrabūn (الْمُقَرَّبُونَ, "Those Brought Near") — (4:172, 56:11).
- Ḥizb Allāh (حِزْبَ اللَّهِ) — (5:56, 58:22).
- Ḥizb ash-Shayṭān (حِزْبَ الشَّيْطَانِ) — (58:19).

== Locations ==
=== Named Geographical Locations ===
- Bābil (بَابِل, Babylon) — (2:102).
- Badr (بَدْر) — (3:123).
- Ḥunayn (حُنَيْن) — (9:25).
- Madyan (مَدْيَن, Midian) — (7:85, 28:22).
- Miṣr (مِصْر, Egypt) — (2:61, 12:21, 43:51).
- Makkah (مَكَّة) — (48:24).
  - Bakkah (بَكَّة) — (3:96).
- Al-Madīnah (الْمَدِينَة) — (9:101, 33:60).
  - Yathrib (يَثْرِب) — (33:13).
- Sabaʾ (سَبَأ) — (27:22, 34:15).
- Iram (إِرَم) — (89:7).
- Al-Aḥqāf (الْأَحْقَاف) — (46:21).
- Al-Ḥijr (الْحِجْر) — (15:80).

=== Religious Locations and Houses of Worship ===
- Masjid (مَسْجِد, "Place of Prostration") — Mentioned 28 times in the Quran.
  - Al-Masjid al-Ḥarām (الْمَسْجِدِ الْحَرَامِ, "The Sacred Mosque") — (2:144, 5:2, 48:27).
  - Al-Masjid al-Aqṣā (الْمَسْجِدِ الْأَقْصَى, "The Farthest Mosque") — (17:1).
  - Masjid at-Taqwā (مَسْجِدٌ عَلَى التَّقْوَى, "The Mosque founded on Piety") — Usually identified as the Qubāʾ Mosque (9:108).
  - Masjid al-Dirar (مَسْجِدَ الضِّرَارِ, "The Mosque of Opposition") — A mosque built by hypocrites to cause harm (9:107).
- Ṣalawāt (صَلَوَات) — Mentioned in 22:40 as houses of worship for Jews.
- Biyaʿ (بِيَع, "Churches") — Mentioned in 22:40.
- Ṣawāmiʿ (صَوَامِع, "Cloisters/Monasteries") — Mentioned in 22:40 as places for monks.
- Miḥrāb (مِحْرَاب, "Sanctuary/Prayer Chamber") — Used in the context of Mary (3:37) and Zechariah (3:39).

=== Sacred Sites and Landmarks ===
- Al-Kaʿbah (الْكَعْبَة) — (5:95, 5:97).
  - Referred to as Al-Bayt al-Ḥarām (الْبَيْتَ الْحَرَامَ) — (5:2).
  - Referred to as Al-Bayt al-ʿAtīq (الْبَيْتِ الْعَتِيقِ) — (22:29).
- Maqām Ibrāhīm (مَقَامِ إِبْرَاهِيم) — (2:125, 3:97).
- Aṣ-Ṣafā wa al-Marwah (الصَّفَا وَالْمَرْوَة) — (2:158).
- ʿArafāt (عَرَفَات) — (2:198).
- Al-Mashʿar al-Ḥarām (الْمَشْعَرِ الْحَرَامِ) — (2:198).
- Aṭ-Ṭūr (الطُّور) — (2:63, 95:2).
  - Referred to as Ṭūr Sīnīn (طُورِ سِينِينَ) — (95:2).
  - Referred to as Ṭūr Sīnāʾ (طُورِ سَيْنَاءَ) — (23:20).
- Al-Wād al-Muqaddas Ṭuwan (الْوَادِ الْمُقَدَّسِ طُوًى) — (20:12, 79:16).
  - Al-Buqʿah al-Mubārakah (الْبُقْعَةِ الْمُبَارَكَةِ) — (28:30).
- Al-Jūdiyy (الْجُودِيّ) — (11:44).
- The Cave (al-Kahf, الْكَهْف) — (18:9).

=== Afterlife and Otherworldly Locations ===
- Jannah (الْجَنَّة, "The Garden/Paradise") — Mentioned 147 times.
  - Jannat al-Maʾwā (جَنَّةُ الْمَأْوَى) — (53:15).
  - Jannāt ʿAdn (جَنَّاتُ عَدْنٍ) — (9:72).
  - Al-Firdaws (الْفِرْدَوْس) — (18:107, 23:11).
- Jahannam (جَهَنَّم, "Hellfire") — Mentioned 77 times.
  - Al-Jaḥīm (الْجَحِيم) — (2:119).
  - Saqar (سَقَر) — (54:48).
  - Saʿīr (سَعِير) — (67:5).
  - Laẓā (لَظَى) — (70:15).
  - Al-Ḥuṭamah (الْحُطَمَة) — (104:4–5).
  - Hāwiyah (هَاوِيَة) — (101:9).
- Sidrat al-Muntaha (سِدْرَةِ الْمُنْتَهَى) — (53:14).
- Al-A'raf (الْأَعْرَاف) — (7:46).
- Barzakh (بَرْزَخ, "The Barrier") — (23:100).
- Salsabil (سَلْسَبِيل) — (76:18).
- Tasnim (تَسْنِيم) — (83:27).

== Plant Matter ==
=== Fruits and Grains ===
- Dates (Nakhl, نَخْل) — Mentioned 20 times; the most frequently mentioned plant in the Quran (e.g., 6:99, 19:23, 55:11).
- Grapes (Aʿnāb, أَعْنَاب) — Mentioned 11 times (e.g., 2:266, 17:91, 78:32).
- Olives (Zaytūn, زَيْتُون) — Mentioned 6 times (6:99, 24:35, 95:1).
- Pomegranates (Rummān, رُمَّان) — Mentioned 3 times (6:99, 6:141, 55:68).
- Figs (Tīn, تِين) — Mentioned 1 time (95:1).
- Bananas / Plantains (Ṭalḥ, طَلْح) — Mentioned in 56:29 as a fruit of Paradise; often interpreted as layered clusters of bananas or acacias.
- Cucumbers (Qith-thāʾ, قِثَّاء) — (2:61).
- Grain / Corn (Ḥabb, حَبّ) — (6:95, 36:33, 55:12).

=== General Flora and Herbs ===
- Lentils (ʿAdas, عَدَس) — (2:61).
- Onions (Baṣal, بَصَل) — (2:61).
- Garlic (Fūm, فُوم) — Mentioned in 2:61; traditionally identified as garlic or wheat.
- Ginger (Zanjabīl, زَنْجَبِيل) — Mentioned in 76:17 as a flavor for the drinks of Paradise.
- Sweet Basil / Scented Plants (Rayḥān, رَيْحَان) — (55:12, 56:89).
- Mustard (Khardal, خَرْدَل) — Used as a metaphor for the smallest weight (21:47, 31:16).
- Herbs / Pot-herbs (Baql, بَقْل) — (2:61).

=== Trees and Woody Plants ===
- Tamarisk (Athl, أَثْل) — Mentioned in 34:16 as one of the few plants remaining after the flood of Saba.
- Lote-tree (Sidr, سِدْر) — (34:16, 56:28).
- Toothbrush Tree (Khamṭ, خَمْط) — Mentioned in 34:16; a bitter/thorny fruit-bearing tree.
- Olive Tree (Shajarah az-Zaytūn) — Described as a "Blessed Tree" (24:35).

=== Unique and Eschatological Plants ===
- Zaqqum (زَقُّوم) — A thorny tree that grows out of the bottom of Hell, whose fruit is like the heads of devils (37:62, 44:43, 56:52).
- Sidrat al-Muntaha (سِدْرَةِ الْمُنْتَهَى, "The Lote Tree of the Farthest Boundary") — A tree at the highest extremity of Paradise (53:14).
- The Forbidden Tree (ash-Shajarah) — The tree from which Adam and Eve were forbidden to eat (2:35, 7:19).
- The Gourd Plant (Yaqṭīn, يَقْطِين) — The plant Allah caused to grow over Jonah for shade and healing (37:146).
- The Blessed Tree — The tree from which Moses heard the Divine call in the Holy Valley (28:30).
- Ḍarīʿ (ضَرِيع) — A bitter, thorny plant that serves as food for the inhabitants of Hell (88:6).

== Holy Books ==
- Al-Qurʾān (الْقُرْآن, "The Recitation") — Mentioned 70 times by name. Islamic tradition attributes about 55 titles to the Quran, including:
  - Al-Kitāb (الْكِتَاب, "The Book") — (2:2).
  - Al-Furqān (الْفُرْقَان, "The Criterion") — (25:1).
  - Adh-Dhikr (الذِّكْر, "The Reminder") — (15:9).
  - An-Nūr (النُّور, "The Light") — (4:174).
  - Al-Mauʿiẓah (الْمَوْعِظَة, "The Admonition") — (10:57).
- Al-Injīl (الْإِنْجِيل, "The Gospel") — The revelation given to Jesus (ʿĪsā); mentioned 12 times.
- At-Tawrāt (التَّوْرَاة, "The Torah") — The revelation given to Moses (Mūsā); mentioned 18 times.
- Az-Zabūr (الزَّبُور, "The Psalms") — The revelation given to David (Dāwūd); mentioned 3 times (4:163, 17:55, 21:105).
- Ṣuḥuf-i Ibrāhīm (صُحُفِ إِبْرَاهِيم) — (87:19).
- Ṣuḥuf-i Mūsā (صُحُفِ مُوسَى) — (53:36, 87:19).
- Al-Alwāḥ (الْأَلْوَاح) — The tablets containing the Law given to Moses (7:145, 7:154).

=== General Scriptural Terms ===
- Al-Kitāb al-Munīr (الْكِتَابِ الْمُنِيرِ, "The Enlightening Book") — A general term for the illuminating scriptures brought by various messengers (3:184, 35:25).
- Az-Zubur (الزُّبُرِ, "The Scriptures/Books of Old") — A plural term referring to the various previous revelations (26:196, 35:25, 54:43).
- Umm al-Kitāb (أُمُّ الْكِتَاب, "The Mother of the Book") — The celestial source of all revelation (13:39, 43:4).
  - Referred to as Lawḥ Maḥfūẓ (لَوْحٍ مَحْفُوظٍ, "The Preserved Tablet") — (85:22).

=== Registers of Deeds ===
- Kitābun Marqūm (كِتَابٌ مَرْقُومٌ, "A Written Register") — (83:9, 83:20).
  - Sijjīn (سِجِّين) — The register of the deeds of the wicked (83:7–9).
  - ʿIlliyyūn (عِلِّيُّون) — The register of the deeds of the righteous (83:18–20).
- The Book of Deeds — The individual record given to every person on the Day of Judgment (17:71, 18:49, 69:19).

== Objects of people or beings ==
- Heavenly Food of Christian Apostles
- Noah's Ark
- Staff of Moses
- Staff of Solomon
- Tābūt as-Sakīnah (Arabic: تَابُوْت ٱلسَّكِيْنَة, Casket of Shekhinah)
- Throne of the Queen of Sheba
- Trumpet of Israfil

=== Mentioned idols (cult images) ===
- 'Ansāb
- Jibt (Arabic: جِبْت) and Ṭāghūt (False god)

==== Of Israelites ====
- Baʿal
- The ʿijl (golden calf statue) of Israelites

==== Of Noah's people ====
- Nasr
- Suwāʿ
- Wadd
- Yaghūth
- Yaʿūq

==== Of Quraysh ====
  - Al-Lāt
  - Al-ʿUzzā
  - Manāt

== Celestial bodies ==
Maṣābīḥ (Arabic: مَصَابِيْح, literally 'lamps'):

- Al-Qamar (Arabic: ٱلْقَمَر, The Moon)
- Kawākib (Arabic: كَوَاكِب, Planets) (Note: Singular: Kawkab (Arabic: كَوْكَب.)
  - Al-Arḍ (Arabic: ٱلْأَرْض, The Earth)
- Nujūm (Arabic: نُجُوْم, Stars) (Note: Singular: Najm (Arabic: ٱلنَّجْم).)
  - Ash-Shams (Arabic: ٱلشَّمْس, The Sun)
  - Ash-Shiʿrā (Arabic: ٱلشِّعْرَى, Sirius)

== Liquids ==
- Māʾ (Arabic: مَاء, Water or fluid)
  - Nahr (Arabic: نَهْر, (Note: 2:249; 18:33; 54:54.) River)
  - Yamm (Arabic: يَمّ, River or sea)
- Sharāb (Arabic: شَرَاب, Drink)

== Chemical elements ==
- Gold
- Silver
- Iron, also a name of Sura in Quran (Chapter 57, Al-Hadid)
- Copper

== Events, incidents, occasions or times ==
- Year of the Elephant
- Incident of Ifk
- Laylat al-Qadr (Night of the Power or Decree)
  - Laylatinm-Mubārakatin (Arabic: لَيْلَةٍ مُّبَارَكَةٍ, lit. 'Blessed Night') (44:3)
- Mubahalah
- Sayl al-ʿArim (Flood of the Great Dam of Ma'rib in Sheba)
- The Farewell Pilgrimage (Hujjal-Wadaʿ)
- Treaty of Hudaybiyyah

=== Battles or military expeditions ===
- Battle of al-Aḥzāb ("the Confederates")
- Battle of Badr
- Battle of Hunayn
- Battle of Khaybar
- Battle of Uhud
- Conquest of Mecca
- Expedition of Tabuk

=== Days ===
- Al-Jumuʿah (The Friday)
- As-Sabt (The Sabbath or Saturday)
- Days of battles or military expeditions (see the above section)
- Days of Hajj
  - Ayyāminm-Maʿdūdatin (Arabic: أَيَّامٍ مَّعْدُوْدَاتٍ, lit. 'Appointed Days') (2:203)
  - Yawm al-Ḥajj al-Akbar (Arabic: يَوْم ٱلْحَجّ ٱلْأَكْبَر, lit. 'Day of the Greatest Pilgrimage') (9:2)
- Day of judgement

=== Months of the Islamic calendar ===
12 months:

- Four holy months (2:189–217; 9:1–36) (Note: Forms: Al-Ash-hur Al-Ḥurum (Arabic: ٱلْأَشْهُر ٱلْحُرُم, The Sacred or Forbidden Months) (9:5); Arbaʿah ḥurum (Arabic: أَرْبَعَة حُرُم, Four (months which are) Sacred) (9:36); Ash-hur maʿlūmāt (Arabic: أَشْهُر مَعْلُوْمَات, Months (which are) well-known (for the Hajj)) (2:197))
  - Ash-Shahr Al-Ḥarām (Arabic: ٱلشَّهْر ٱلْحَرَام, The Sacred or Forbidden Month) (2:194–217; 5:97)
  - Ramaḍān (Arabic: رَمَضَان) (2:183–187)

=== Pilgrimages ===
- Al-Ḥajj (The Greater Pilgrimage)
  - Ḥajj al-Bayt (Arabic: حَجّ ٱلْبَيْت, "Pilgrimage of the House") (2:158)
  - Ḥijj al-Bayt (Arabic: حِجّ ٱلْبَيْت, "Pilgrimage of the House") (3:97)
- Al-ʿUmrah (The Lesser Pilgrimage) (2:158–196)

=== Times for Prayer or Remembrance ===
Times for Duʿāʾ ('Invocation'), Ṣalāh and Dhikr ('Remembrance', including Taḥmīd ('Praising'), Takbīr and Tasbīḥ):

- Al-ʿAshiyy (Arabic: ٱلْعَشِيّ, The Afternoon or the Night) (30:17–18)
- Al-Ghuduww (Arabic: ٱلْغُدُوّ, lit. 'The Mornings') (7:205–206)
  - Al-Bukrah (Arabic: ٱلْبُكْرَة, lit. 'The Morning') (48:9)
  - Aṣ-Ṣabāḥ (Arabic: ٱلصَّبَاح, lit. 'The Morning') (30:17–18)
- Al-Layl (Arabic: ٱللَّيْل, lit. 'The Night') (17:78–81; 50:39–40)
  - Al-ʿIshāʾ (Arabic: ٱلْعِشَاء, lit. 'The Late-Night') (24:58)
- Aẓ-Ẓuhr (Arabic: ٱلظُّهْر, lit. 'The Noon') (30:17–18)
  - Aẓ-Ẓahīrah (Arabic: ٱلظَّهِيْرَة) (24:58)
- Dulūk ash-Shams (Arabic: دُلُوْك ٱلشَّمْس, lit. 'Decline of the Sun') (17:78–81)
  - Al-Masāʾ (Arabic: ٱلْمَسَاء, lit. 'The Evening') (30:17–18)
  - Qabl al-Ghurūb (Arabic: قَبْل ٱلْغُرُوْب, lit. 'Before the Setting (of the Sun)') (50:39–40)
    - Al-Aṣīl (Arabic: ٱلْأٓصِيْل, lit. 'The Afternoon') (33:42; 48:9; 76:25–26) (Note: Al-Āṣāl (Arabic: ٱلْأٓصَال, lit. 'the Afternoons') (7:205–206).)
    - Al-ʿAṣr (Arabic: ٱلْعَصْر, lit. 'The Afternoon') (103:1–3)
- Qabl ṭulūʿ ash-Shams (Arabic: قَبْل طُلُوْع ٱلشَّمْس, lit. 'Before the rising of the Sun') (50:39–40)
  - Al-Fajr (Arabic: ٱلْفَجْر, lit. 'The Dawn') (17:78–81; 24:58)

=== Implied ===
- Event of Ghadir Khumm (5:67)
- Laylat al-Mabit (2:207)
- The first pilgrimage (48:27)

== Others ==
- Bayt (Arabic: بًيْت, Home or House)
  - Al-Bayt al-Maʿmūr (Arabic: ٱلْبَيْت ٱلْمَعْمُوْر)
- Ḥunafāʾ (Arabic: حُنَفَاء)
- Ṭāhā (Arabic: طـٰهٰ)
- Ṭayyibah (Arabic: طَيِّبَة)
- Zīnah (Arabic: زِيْنَة), Adornment, beauty, beautiful thing or splendour)

== See also ==
- Biblical people in Islam
- Holiest sites in Islam
- Ḥ-R-M
- List of biblical names
- List of burial places of Abrahamic figures
- List of mosques that are mentioned by name in the Quran
- List of people in both the Bible and the Quran
- Muhammad in the Quran
- Names of God in Islam
