= Expedition of Khalid ibn al-Walid (2nd Dumatul Jandal) =

Muslim military expedition to Dumatul Jandal in April 631 AD

Khalid ibn al-Walid invaded the city of Dumat Al-Jandal in April 631 AD, under the orders of Muhammad to retaliate for the killings of preachers that had previously been sent by him. He also ordered Khalid to destroy an idol that was worshipped by the Bani Kalb tribe.

This was the second time Khalid was sent on a military invasion to Dumat Al-Jandal. He was also sent to Dumatul Jandal in March 631 to invade the land of a Christian prince who ruled the area.

== Wadd ==
Wadd (Arabic: ود) meaning the God of Love and Friendship, also known as Almaqah, ʻAmm and Sīn, was the Minaean moon god. Snakes were held sacred to the believers of Wadd. He is mentioned in the Qur'an (71:23) as a God in the time of the Prophet, Noah.

And they say: By no means leave your gods, nor leave Wadd, nor Suwa'; nor Yaghuth, and Ya'uq and Nasr. (Qur'an 71:23)

Before it razed by invasion of Khalid, the temple of Wadd was located at Dumatol Jandal.

== Expedition ==
Muhammad sent Khalid ibn Walid to demolish Wadd after the battle of Tabuk , an idol worshipped by the Banu Kalb tribe.

Khalid went to Dumat Al-Jandal to destroy it, but the Banu Abd-Wadd and the Banu Amir al Ajdar tribes resisted. Khalid slew all resistance, Ibn Kalbi also mentions that among those slaughtered were Qatan ibn-Shurayb, whose mother wept at his death and fell over to his body and started sobbing until she died. Khalid demolished the deistic symbol and destroyed the entire shrine.

== Islamic primary sources ==
The Muslim historian Hisham Ibn Al-Kalbi, mentions this event as follows:

Abu-al-Mundbir related that [his father] al-Kalbi once said: I was told by Malik ibn-Harithah al-Ajdari that he himself had seen Wadd, and that his father was wont to send him to it with some milk saying, "Offer it unto thy god to drink." Malik added, "I used to drink the milk myself.' He also said, "I also saw it after Khalid ibn-al-Walid had destroyed it and smashed it into pieces." For the Apostle of God had, after the battle of Tabuk, sent Khalid ibn-al-Walid to destroy it. But the banu-'Abd-Wadd and the banu-'Amir al-Ajdar resisted Khalid and attempted to defend the idol. Khalid, therefore, fought and defeated them, and then destroyed [the shrine] and demolished the idol. Among those killed in battle on that day was a man of the banu-'Abd-Wadd whose name was Qatan ibn-Shurayb. His mother happened upon him dead and thereupon cried out saying:

"Verily friendiship doth never last, Nor do the blissful times 'er endure; A mother's love doth not save a son From misfortune, nor his life insure." She then said:

"O thou the centre of my love, The source of all my joy and mirth! Would that thy mother were never born, Nor e'er to thee hath given birth." After which she fell over his body sobbing and died. Hassan ibn-Masad, the cousin of al-Ukaydir the ruler of Dumat al-Jandal, was also killed. [In short] it was Khalid who destroyed [Wadd].

[The Book of Idols, By Hisham Ibn-Al-Kalbi, Pg 48-49]

== See also ==
- Military career of Muhammad
- List of expeditions of Muhammad
