= Nakrah =

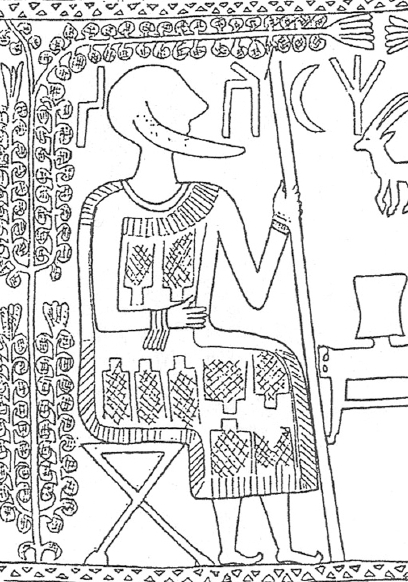
Nakrah deity

Nakrah (Sabaean: NKRḤ [M], Arabic: نكرح, romanized: Nakraḥ and Nikraḥum) was an ancient South Arabian god of protection and salvation worshiped in the Minaean Kingdom.

The place of worship of the deity is located in today's Jawf in northern Yemen. It is located near the village Ma'in, the ancient Qarnawu. Around his sanctuary was a sacred precinct bounded by nine inscription stones. The site is located around the hill Darb al-Ṣabī. In Baraqish there are temples that were created In honor of Nakrah. Adolf Grohmann assumed that Nakrah was a sun goddess, which stood in Ma'in next to the moon god Almaqah and Venus Athtar. However, Jacques Ryckmans and W. W. Müller, said that Nakrah was a male god.

== See also ==
- Wadd
- 'Amm
- Temple of Nakrah

== Bibliography ==
- Jacques Ryckmans: Die Altsüdarabische Religion. In: Werner Daum (Hrsg.): Jemen. Umschau, Frankfurt am Main, ISBN 3-7016-2251-5, S. 111–115.
