= Tree of life (Quran) =

Tree of life motif in the Quran

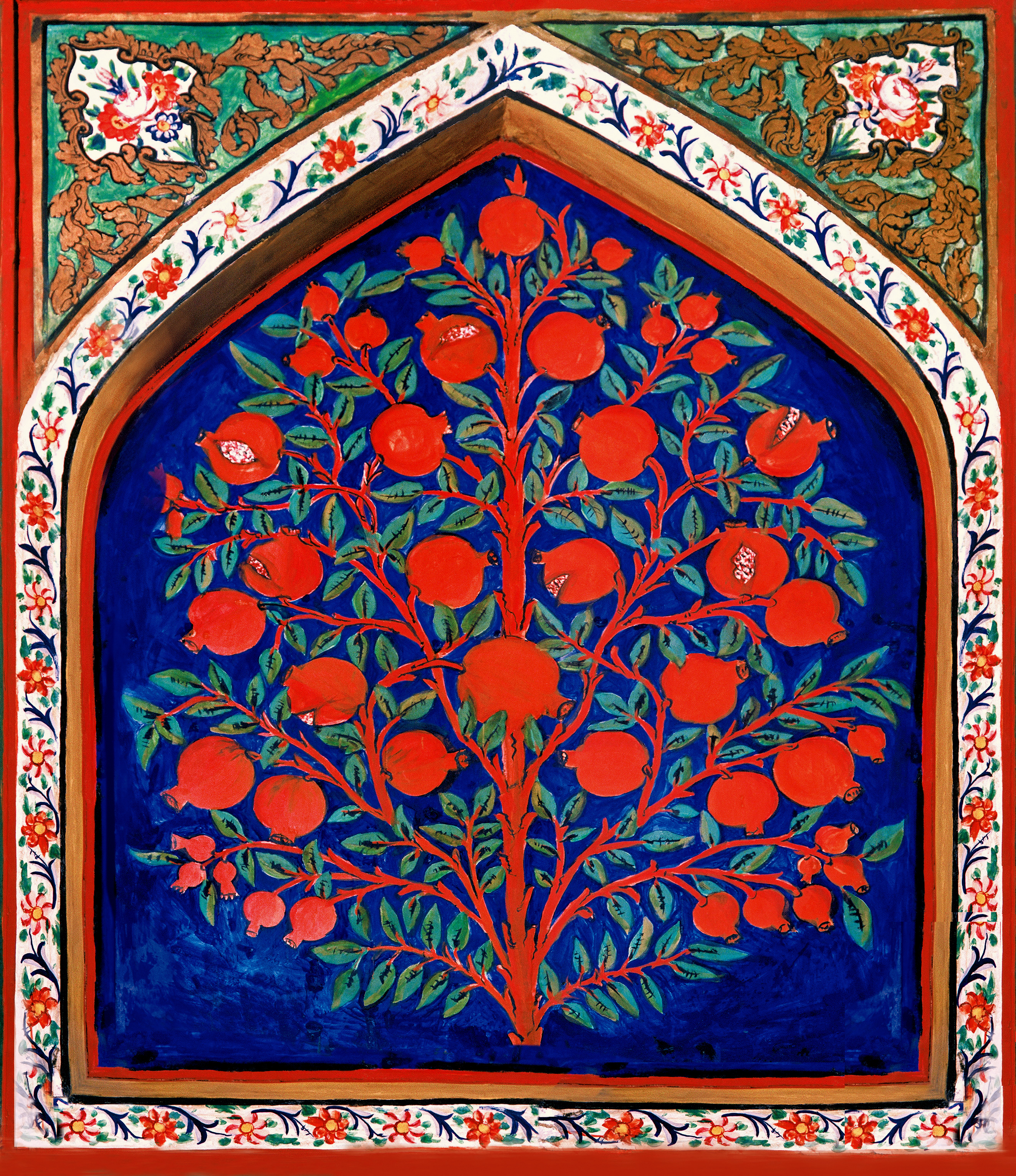
The Tree of Immortality, Palace of Shaki Khans, Azerbaijan

The Tree of Immortality (Arabic: شَجَرَةُ الْخُلْد, romanized: šajara al-ḫuld) is the tree of life motif as it appears in the Quran. It is also alluded to in hadiths and tafsir. Unlike in the biblical account, the Quran mentions only one tree in Jannah, which was whispered to Adam by Shaytan as the tree of immortality, and which God specifically forbade to Adam and Hawa. There is no tree of the knowledge of good and evil in the Quran.

== Meaning of the tree ==
The tree in the Quran is used as an example of a concept, idea, way of life or code of life. A good concept/idea is represented as a good tree and a bad idea/concept is represented as a bad tree. Shaytan appeared to them and told them that the only reason God forbade them to eat from that tree was that they would become angels or start using the idea/concept of ownerships in conjunction with inheritance generations after generations, which Iblis convinced Adam to accept.

== See also ==
- List of characters and names mentioned in the Quran#Plant matter
- Sidrat al-Muntaha
