= Noah in Islam =

Prophet in Islam

Prophet Nūḥ
- نُوْح; Noah
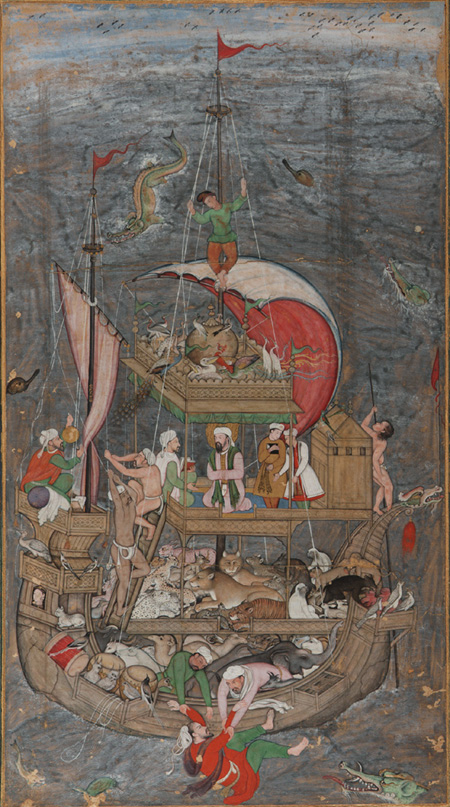
- A depiction of Noah and the Ark in a Mughal miniature from the 16th century

Prophet of Islam
- Preceded by: Idris
- Succeeded by: Hud

Personal life
- Spouse: Na'amah
- Children: Sam, Ham, Yam and Yafith
- Parent: Lamech (Note: Assuming Nuh is identical with Noah.)
- Known for: Noah's Ark

Religious life
- Religion: Islam

Noah, known as Nuh (Arabic: نُوْحٌ, romanized: Nūḥ), is recognized in Islam as a prophet and messenger of God. He is also believed to be the first messenger sent by God. He is one of the Ulul 'azm prophets. Noah's mission was to warn his people, who were plunged in idol worshipping. God charged Noah with the duty of preaching to his people, advising them to abandon idolatry and to worship only God, and to live good and pure lives.

Although he preached the Message of God with zeal, his people refused to mend their ways, leading to building the Ark and the Deluge, the Great Flood. In Islamic tradition, it is disputed whether the Great Flood was a global or a local one. Noah's preaching and prophethood spanned 950 years according to the Quran, Hadith and Tafsir.

== In the Quran ==
=== Praise ===
Noah is praised by God in the Quran, which shows his great status amongst the prophets. In 17:3 of the Quran, God states: "He was indeed a grateful servant." The Quran also states in a later chapter:

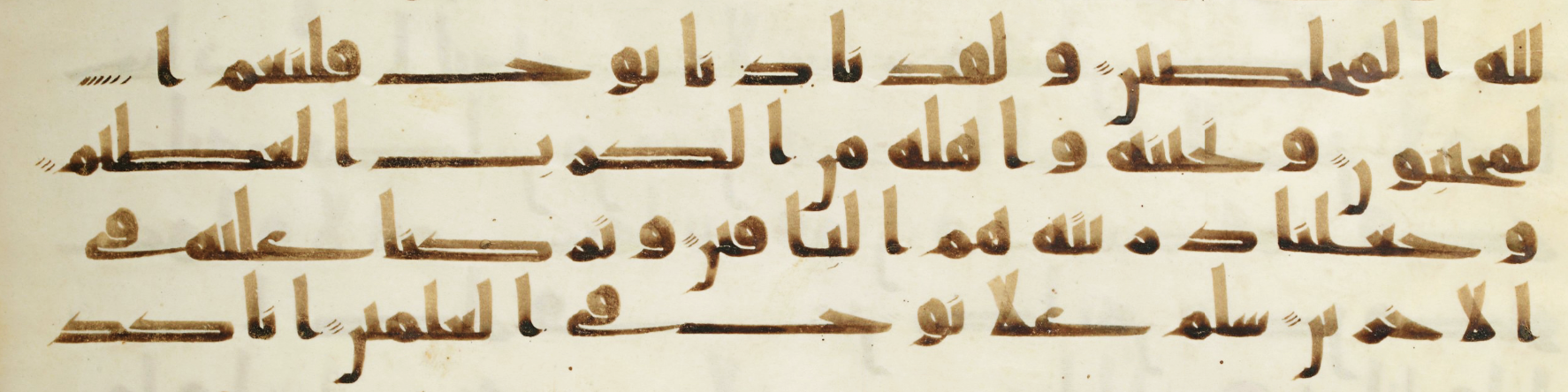
8th–9th century Egyptian manuscript of Quran 37:75–79

Indeed, Noah cried out to Us, and how excellent are We in responding!
We delivered him and his family from the great distress,
and made his descendants the sole survivors.
And We blessed him ˹with honourable mention˺ among later generations:
“Peace be upon Noah among all peoples.”

— Surah As-Saaffat 37:75-79

And also in 3:33, the Quran states: "Indeed, Allah chose Adam, Noah, the family of Abraham, and the family of ʿImrān above all people ˹of their time˺.

=== Story ===
According to the Quran, Noah was inspired by God like other prophets—such as Ibrāhīm (Abraham), Ismā'īl (Ishmael), Ishaq (Isaac), Ya'qub (Jacob), Isa (Jesus), Ilyas (Elijah), Ayyub (Job), Harun (Aaron), Yunus (Jonah), Dawud (David) and Muhammad—and was a faithful messenger. Noah had firm belief in tawhid (the oneness of God), and preached Islam (literally "submission," meaning submission to God).

He continuously warned the people of the painful doom that was coming and asked them to accept one God instead of worshipping idols such as Wadd, Suwa', Yaghuth, Ya'uq and Nasr. He called the people to serve God, and said that nobody but God could save them. He said that the time of the deluge was appointed and could not be delayed, and that the people had to submit to God.

God commanded Noah to build a ship, the Ark, and as he was building it, the chieftains passed him and mocked him. Upon its completion, the ship is said to be loaded with pairs of every animal, and Noah's household, and a group of believers who did submit to God. The people who denied the message of Noah, including one of his own sons, drowned. The final resting place of the ship was referred to as "Al-Jūdiyy" or a "Munzalanm-Mubārakan" (Arabic: مُنْزَلًا مُّبَارَكًا, romanized: Place-of-Landing Blessed). Noah is called a grateful servant. Both Noah and Abraham were taught the prophethood and the scripture. According to Shi'a tafsir (exegesis), God commanded Noah to take all species that he needed on the ship. The commentary by Prophetic descendants explains the verse to mean eight animals.

== Traditional narrative in Islam ==
According to Islam, he was a prophet, sent to warn mankind of that region and his people to change their ways. He conveyed the message for over 950 years. Islamic literature recounts that in the Generations of Adam, many men and women continued to follow Adam's original teachings, worshiping God alone and remaining righteous. Among Adam's descendants there were many brave and pious men, greatly loved and revered by their respective communities. Exegesis goes on to narrate that, upon the death of these elders, people felt enormous grief and some felt prompted to make statues of these people in remembrance of them. Then gradually, through the generations many forgot what such statues were for and began to worship them, (as the Shaytan (Satan) slowly deceived each generation) along with many other idols. In order to guide the people, God appointed Noah with the duty of being the next prophet to humanity.

=== Early preaching ===
According to Islamic belief, Noah began preaching to his people both verbally and through example. He would praise God consistently and he urged his people to do the same, warning his tribe of the punishment they would face if they did not mend their ignorant ways. The Quran states that Noah repeatedly told his people:

“O my people! Worship Allah—you have no other god except Him. I truly fear for you the torment of a tremendous Day.”

— Surah Al-A'raf 7:59

Though a few were moved by Noah's words, the powerful and wealthy members of the tribe refused to hear his call. The unbelievers at the time were impelled to rebel by various evil motives. Firstly, they were extremely envious and jealous of men superior to them in any way. Secondly, the people were ignorant of the weak and lowly, who were frequently superior intellectually, morally and spiritually. As a result of their ignorance, they were arrogant and mocked all who they felt were inferior to them. They would ask Noah, "Shall we believe in you, when the inferior follow you?" Noah would respond: "Their account is only with my Lord, if you could (but) know." When Noah preached the faith of God to them, all they did was revile the messenger, abuse the Message, and refer to the whole warning as a lie. He then went on to explain the Prophetic Message in greater depth, ensuring them that it was not a message of destruction but it was a message with the mercy from God, and that their acts would lead to destruction if they did not accept the faith. He questioned them, asking why they would not accept what would benefit them in the near future. Noah went onto further, and told his community that he asked of no reward from them, telling them his only reward would be from God. But his people threatened him with being stoned.

=== Accusation ===
As time passed, Noah became firmer in his preaching. When the unbelievers began insulting those who accepted God's message, believing that Noah would send those faithful away to attract the wealthy unbelievers, Noah revealed that they—the arrogant and ignorant rich—were the wicked and sinful ones. His people accused him of being soothsayer or diviner. Noah declared that he was by no means a mere fortune-teller, pretending to reveal secrets which are not worth revealing. Noah also denied accusations claiming he was an angel, always maintaining that he was a human messenger. When the people refused to acknowledge their sinfulness Noah told them that it was not Noah, but God that would punish them - however God pleased.

=== Prayer ===
The Quran states that Noah prayed to God, complaining that his preaching only made his people disbelieve further. Noah told God how they had obstinately refused to accept the message, so that the light of the truth should not affect their thinking. Noah told God how he had used all the resources of the classical preacher, conveying the message both in public places and with individuals in private. Noah spoke of how he had told the people the rewards they would receive if they became righteous, namely that God would supply plentiful rain as a blessing, and that God would also guarantee them an increase in children and wealth.

=== Building of the Ark ===
According to the Quran, one day, Noah received a revelation from God, in which he was told that no one would believe the message, aside from the few who had already submitted to God. Noah's frustration at the defiance of his people led him to ask God to not leave even one sinner. Although there is no proof that God accepted his prayer (as there are many examples of accepted prayers, such as in case of Yunus, Lut (Lot), Suleyman (Solomon) etc., even Noah's prayer in some other shape was accepted), God decreed that a terrible flood would come and He ordered Noah to build a ship (Arabic: فلك, romanized: fulk) which would save him and the believers from this dreadful calamity. Ever-obedient to God's instructions, Noah went out in search of material with which to construct the vessel. When Noah began building the Ark, the people who saw him at work laughed and mocked at him even more than before. Their conclusion was that he was surely a madman; they could not find any other reason why a man would build a huge vessel when no sea or river was nearby. Although Noah was now very old, the aged patriarch continued to work tirelessly until, at last, the Ark was finished.

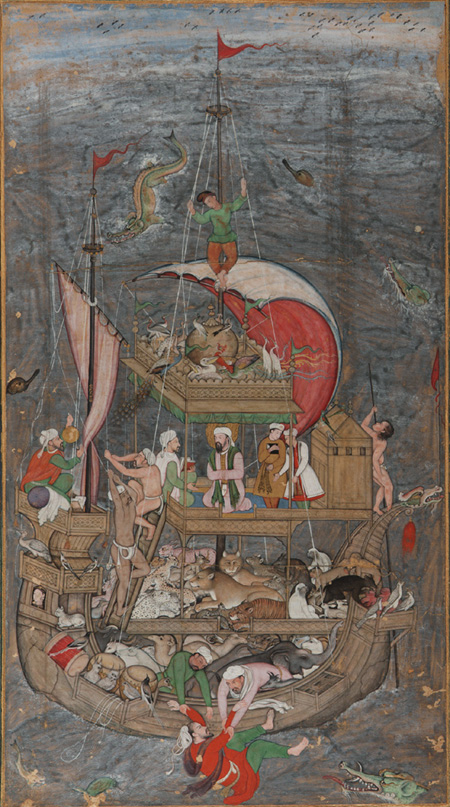
Depiction of Noah and the ark in a Mughal miniature from the 16th century

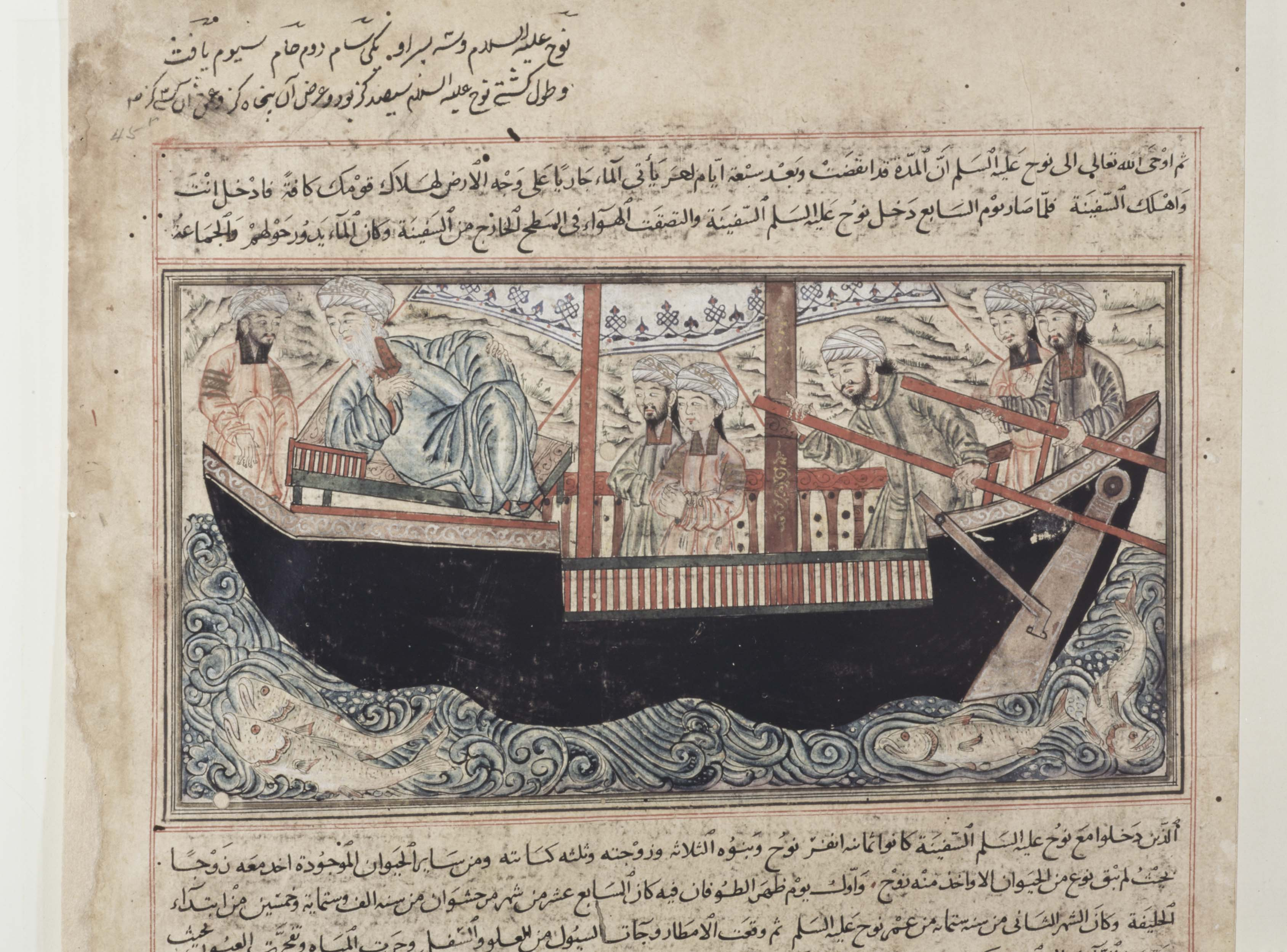
Noah's ark depicted in a 14th-century manuscript of Rashid al-Din's world history, the Jami' al-tawarikh

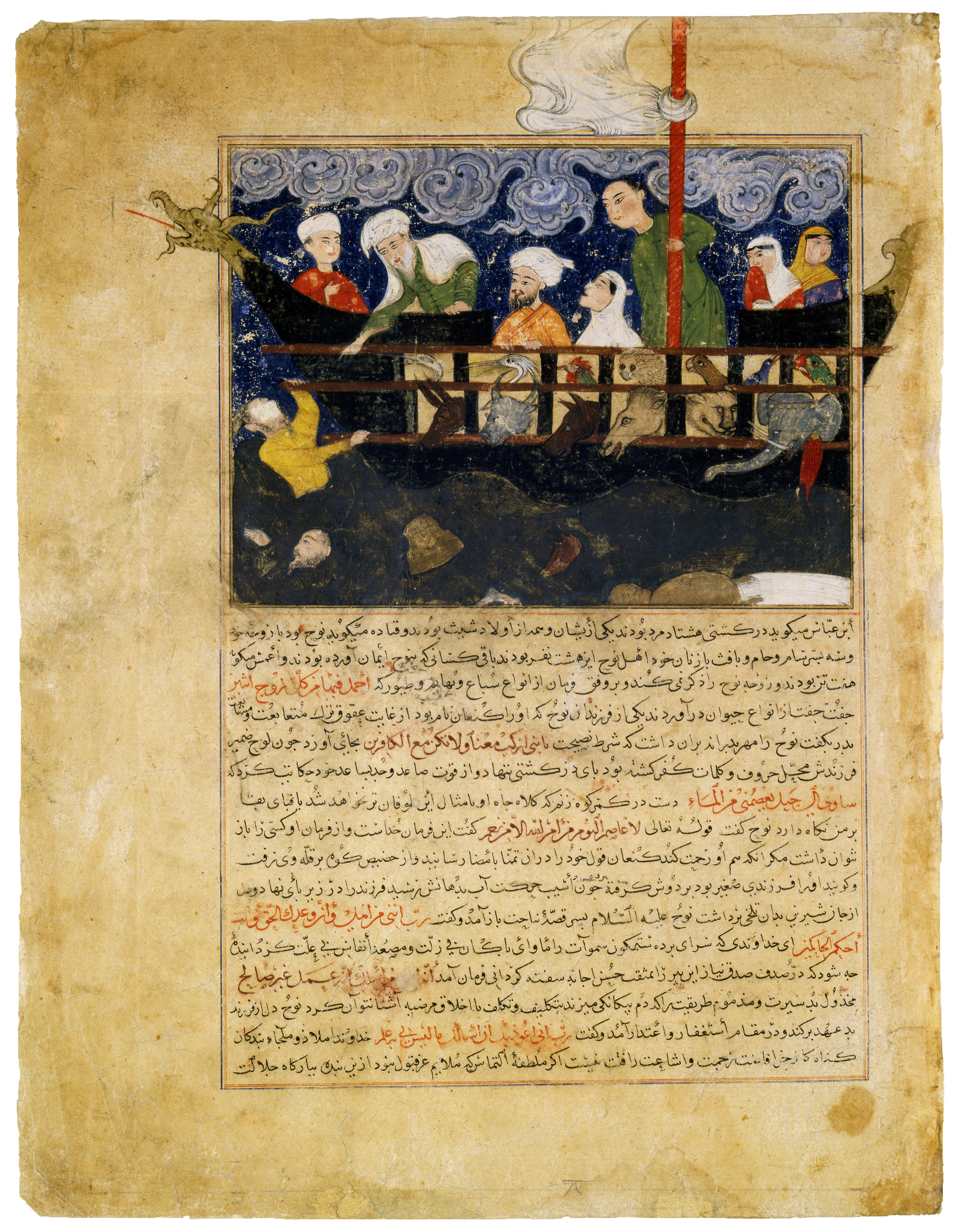
Persian miniature from Hafiz-i Abru's Majma al-tawarikh depicting Noah's ark, 1405–1447

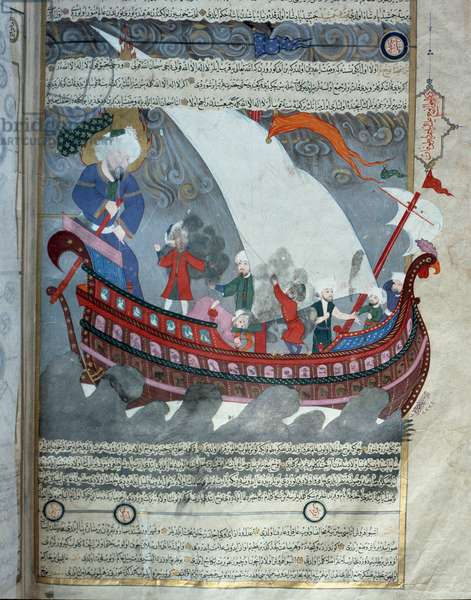
Noah's ark and the deluge from the Zubdat-al Tawarikh

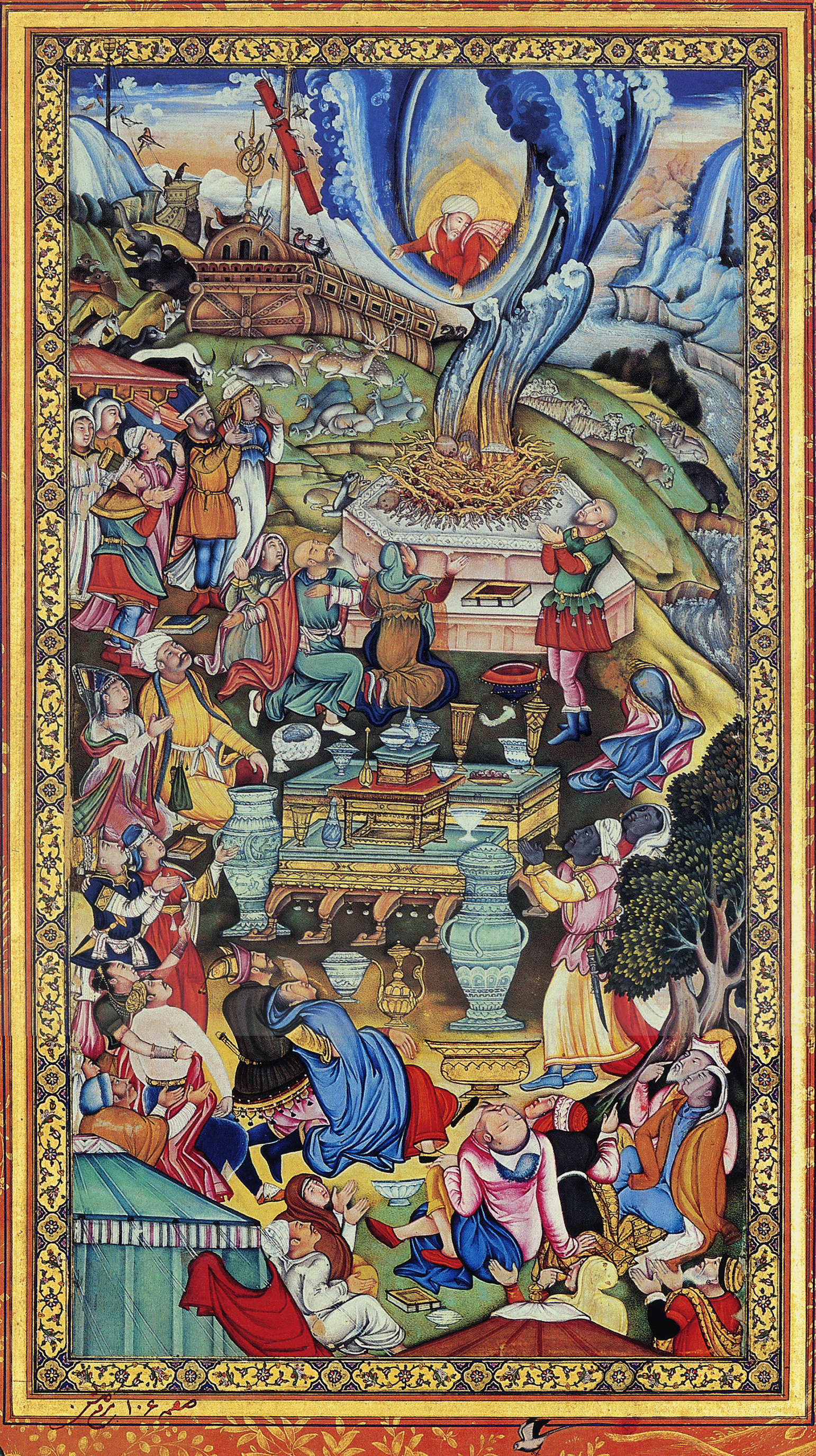
Mughal miniature depicting the story of Noah from the Muraqqa-e Gulshan

=== Family ===
Little is known of Noah's personal history before his call to prophecy. However, Ibn Kathir records him to have been the son of Lamech and grandson of Methuselah, one of the patriarchs from the Generations of Adam. Noah was neither the leader of the tribe nor a very rich man but, even before being called to prophecy, he worshipped God faithfully and was, in the words of the Quran, "a devotee most grateful".

Noah was married to a woman whose name is not mentioned in the Quran. Some Islamic historians such as Al-Tabari have suggested that the name of Noah's wife was Umzarah bint Barakil but this cannot be confirmed. Most Muslims simply call her by her midrashic name Naamah. The Quran states that Noah's wife was not a believer with him so she did not join him.

The sons of Noah are not expressly mentioned in the Quran, except for the statement that one of the sons, Yam, was among the people who did not follow his own father, not among the believers, and so he was washed away in the flood. Also the Quran indicates a great calamity, enough to have destroyed Noah's people, but to have saved him and his generations to come.

Noah's wife (Naamah) is referred to in the Quran as an evil woman. When God emphasizes upon the notion that everyone is for themselves on the Day of Judgement and that marital relations will not be to your aid when the judgement takes place, the Quran says:

Allah sets forth an example for the disbelievers: the wife of Noah and the wife of Lot. Each was married to one of Our righteous servants, yet betrayed them. So their husbands were of no benefit to them against Allah whatsoever. Both were told, “Enter the Fire, along with the others!”

— Surah At-Tahrim 66:10

In contrast, the wife of the Pharaoh of the Exodus, Asiya, and Mary, the mother of Jesus, are referred to as among the best of women. This adds to the notion that, on the Last Day, everyone will be judged according to their own deeds. The "Stories of The Prophets" explain that the son who declined to embark was a non-believer.

== In culture ==
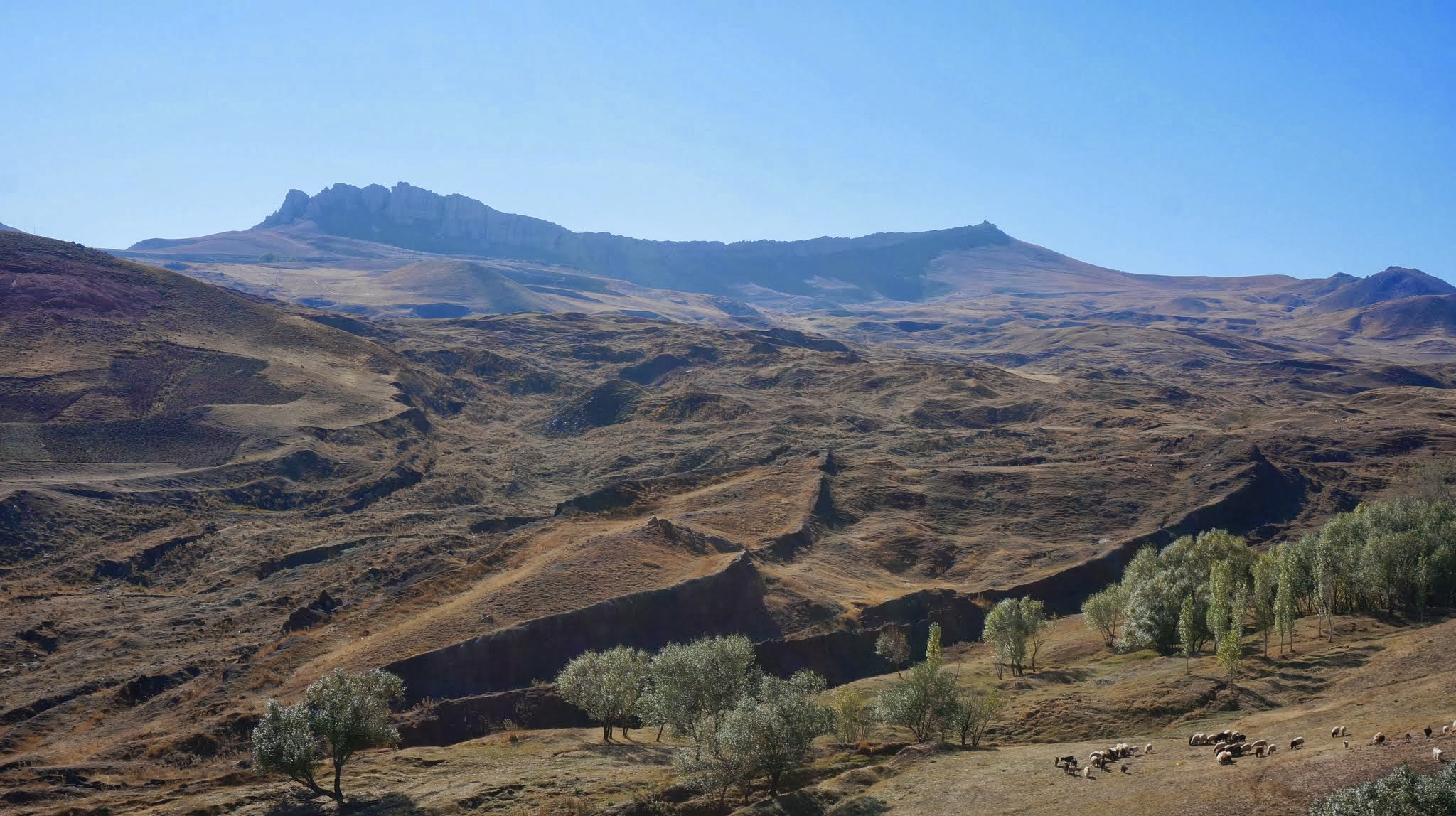
The Durupınar site is a geological formation on Mount Tendürek in eastern Anatolia. Due to its ship-like appearance, it was thought to be the ark built by Nuh.

=== Searches for Noah's Ark ===
Searches for Noah's Ark have been reported since antiquity, as ancient scholars sought to affirm the historicity of the Genesis flood narrative by citing accounts of relics recovered from the Ark. With the emergence of biblical archaeology in the 19th century, the potential of a formal search attracted interest in alleged discoveries and hoaxes. By the 1940s, expeditions were being organized to follow up on these purported leads. This modern search movement has been informally called "arkeology".

In 2020, the young Earth creationist group the Institute for Creation Research acknowledged that, despite many expeditions, Noah's Ark had not been found and is unlikely to be found. Many of the supposed findings and methods used in the search are regarded as pseudoscience and pseudoarchaeology by geologists and archaeologists.

=== Ashure ===
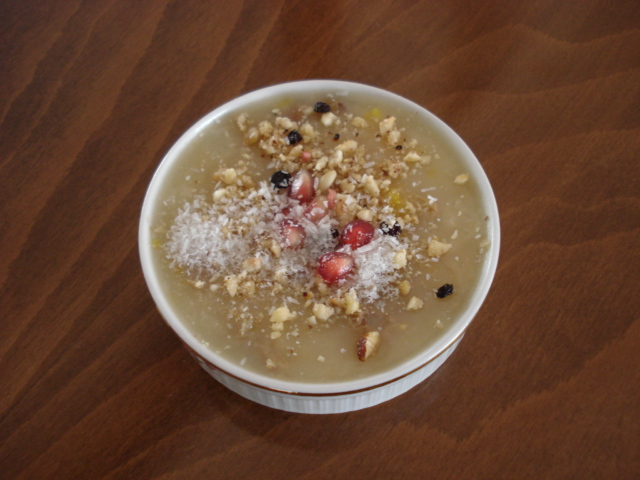
Ashure or "Noah's pudding"

There is a Turkish dessert in remembrance of Noah, which is called Aşure or "Noah's pudding". It is made out of grains, nuts, and dried and fresh fruits. These are believed to be the few ingredients left on the ark, used by Noah and his family to celebrate the end of the flood.

=== Tomb ===
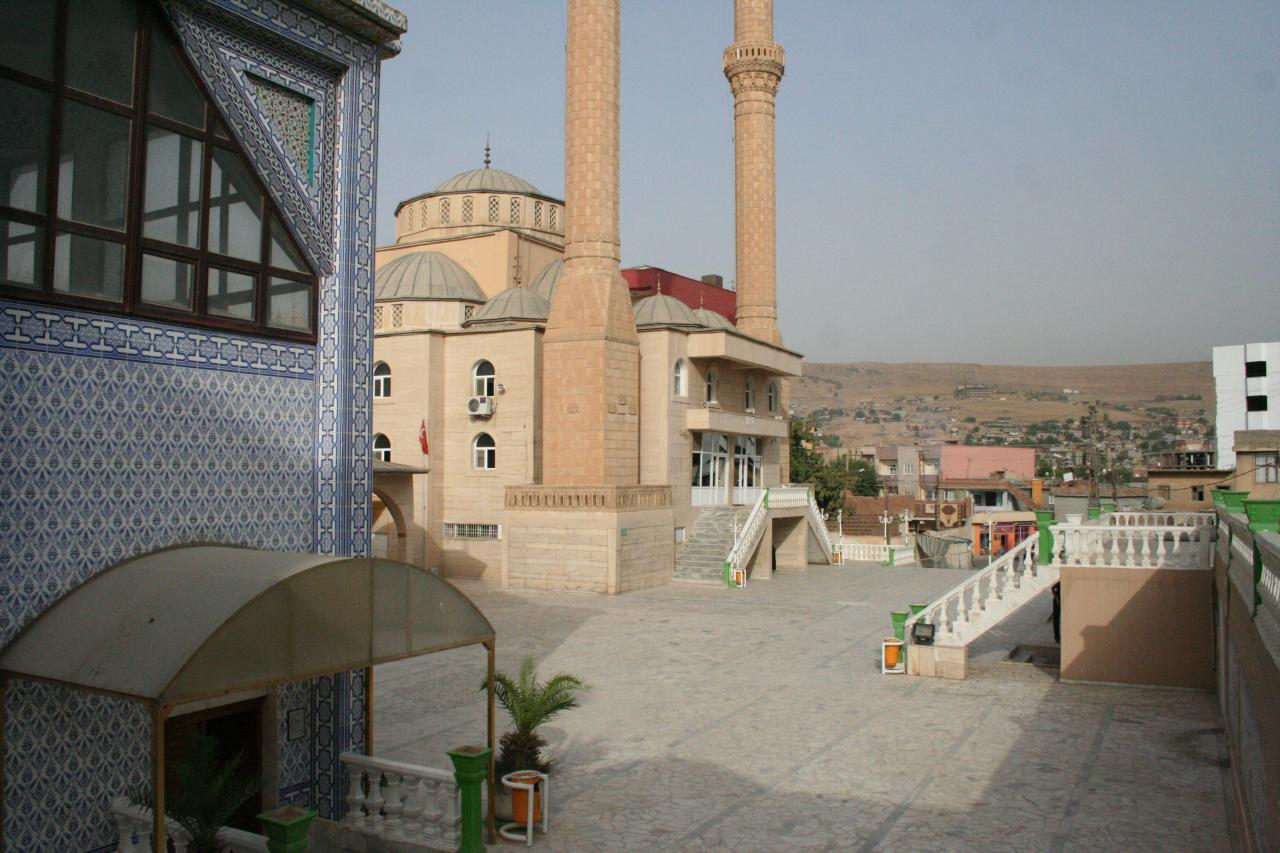
A claimed mausoleum of Noah in Cizre, southeast Turkey, near Cudi Dağı

There are several sites that are claimed to be the Tomb of Noah:

- Noah's Mausoleum in Cizre, Şırnak, Turkey
- Noah's Mausoleum (Sunni Islam) in Nakhchivan, Azerbaijan
- Karak Nuh, Beqaa, Lebanon

== References in the Quran ==
- As one of the first messengers: 4:163, 6:84, 11:25, 26:107, 29:14, 37:75, 57:26, 71:1-2, 71:5
- Noah's preaching: 4:163, 7:59, 7:61-64, 10:71-72, 11:25-26, 11:28-31, 11:42, 23:23, 26:105-106, 26:108, 26:110, 71:1-3, 71:8-20
- Challenges for Noah: 7:60-61, 10:71, 11:27, 11:32, 14:9, 23:24-26, 25:37, 26:105, 26:111-113, 26:116-118, 38:12, 40:5, 50:12, 53:52, 54:9-10, 66:10, 71:6-7, 71:21-24, 71:26-27
- "The grateful" Noah: 17:3
- Noah's wishes granted: 21:76-77, 26:119, 37:75, 54:11-12
- God destroyed Noah's people: 7:64, 9:70, 10:73, 11:37, 11:43-44, 11:89, 23:27, 25:37, 26:120, 29:14, 37:82, 40:31, 51:46, 53:52, 54:11-12, 71:25
- Noah was saved on the Ark: 7:64, 10:73, 11:37-38, 11:40-44, 11:48, 23:27-29, 26:119, 29:15, 37:76, 54:13-15, 69:11
- Appraisal for Noah: 17:3, 37:78-81, 66:10

== See also ==
- Biblical narratives and the Quran
- Corduene/Kurdistan
- Epic of Gilgamesh
- Flood myth
  - List
- İlandağ of the Lesser Caucasus in Nakhchivan, Azerbaijan
- Muhammad in Islam
- Seven Laws of Noah
- The Sinjar Mountains in Nineveh Governorate, Iraq
- Stories of The Prophets
