= Book of Idols =

Book by Hisham Ibn Al-Kalbi

The Book of Idols (Kitāb al-ʾAṣnām), written by the Arab scholar Hisham ibn al-Kalbi (737–819), is the most popular Islamic work about the religion in pre-Islamic Arabia. Arabian religion before Muhammad is described as polytheistic and idolatrous. Ibn al-Kalbi portrays this state of religion as a degradation from the pure monotheism introduced by Abraham and his son Ishmael, only restored by the coming of Islam. Ibn al-Kalbi relied on Arab oral tradition to write his work. Many historians today do not consider the Book of Idols to be a reliable source for Arabian religion before Islam.

== Overview ==
The Book of Idols is essentially an itemized list of short descriptions of idols and sanctuaries in pre-Islamic Arabia. For each idol, he describes their geography and tribe. Sometimes Ibn al-Kalbi offers additional information, such as how the idol was destroyed in the Islamic era. In the primary manuscript, the text is 56 pages and each page contains 12 lines. The longest entry is about the goddess al-Uzza, mentioned in Surah 53 as one of the "Daughters of Allah" alongside Al-Lat and Manat. Ibn al-Kalbi says that the cult of al-Uzza was centered in Mecca, Al-Lat in Taif, and Manat in Medina. The entries on these goddesses appear sequentially (one after the other), as do the five entries on the five pagan deities of Surah 71. Beyond this, no other organizing principle appears in the text to govern the order in which Ibn al-Kalbi discusses local idols. In addition, Ibn al-Kalbi occasionally cites pre-Islamic Arabic poetry and, more rarely, the Quran. Entries are sometimes interrupted to explain the origins of idolatry after God's introduction of monotheism with Abraham.

== Composition and authorship ==
The Book of Idols is considered a composite work comprising materials from many sources. It emerged as a result of accretion, reworkings, and interpolation, which resulted in the production of repetitions, variations, and interruptions in the text. On a number of occasions, the text treats the same subject more than once, in each case offering a contradictory account. Nyberg argued that the core of the Book goes back to Ibn al-Kalbi, transmitted through Abu Bakr Ahmad ibn Muhammad al-Jawhari (d. 944–45), whose name appears as the final link in the shorter isnads (chains of transmission) that are listed in the second half of the text. Al-Jawhari is thought here to have added to Ibn al-Kalbi's core several reports that he thought also, in some way, went back to Ibn al-Kalbi. Later, an appendix with information about more idols was also added to the text. Other recensions of the text have not survived but are likely to have existed. Yaqut al-Hamawi (d. 1229) quoted the text at length, and these quotations contain some material not found in manuscripts of the Book of Idols. Ibn al-Kalbi therefore cannot be considered the author of the work, which is a centuries-long accumulation of individual reports.

== Discovery ==
In the first half of the 20th century, Ahmad Zaki Pasha, an Egyptian philologist, discovered the text; he bought the sole extant manuscript at auction in Damascus and the manuscript, one of many in his extensive collection, was donated to the state after his death in 1934. Zaki Pasha announced his discovery at the XIVth International Congress of Orientalists.

== Themes ==
=== Monotheism and polytheism ===
Five pagan gods are named in Quran 71:23: Wadd, Suwāʿ, Yaghūth, Yaʿūq and Nasr. Ibn al-Kalbi and Ibn Ishaq associated their worship with South Arabia. Another three pagan gods are named in Quran 53:19–20, the "Daughters of Allah": al-Lāt, al-‘Uzzā and Manāt of Quran 53:19–20. Their worship was associated with north and central Arabian tribes, and because they were closer to the Hejaz, they had a higher status. Altogether, Ibn al-Kalbi portrays the eight pagan gods named in the Quran as dominating the religious world of pre-Islamic Arabia.

According to Ibn al-Kalbi, the North Arabian tribe Nizār commonly exclaimed:

‘Here I am, Allāh! Here I am! (Labbayka Allāhumma! Labbayka!) Here I am! You have no partner (sharīk) save one who is yours! You have dominion over him and over what he possesses.’ They were used to declare his unity through the talbiyāt while associating their gods with him, placing their affairs in his hand.

At the same time, while Arabia worshiped idols, Ibn al-Kalbi claims that remnants of Abraham's pure monotheism survived among a small group of hanifs, or pre-Islamic Arabian monotheists:

But [in spite of the idolatry and polytheism which had spread among the Arabs] there were survivals of the time of Abraham and Ishmael which they [the Arabs] followed in their rituals – revering the sanctuary, circumambulating it, ḥajj, ʿumra, standing upon ʿArafa and Muzdalifa, offering beasts for sacrifice, and making the ihlāl [i.e., the talbiya] in the ḥajj and the ʿumra – together with the introduction of things which did not belong to it.

=== Origins of Arabian monotheism ===
Ibn al-Kalbi offers two origins myths (etiologies) to explain how the original monotheism of Abraham was succeeded by polytheism until Muhammad. The first begins with 'Amr bin Luhay, the chief of the Arab Banu Khuza'ah. 'Amr seized chieftainship over Mecca. 'Amr later travelled to al-Balqāʾ in Syria, where he learned about the veneration of idols. He collected some idols there and brought them back to the Kaaba, where he set them up. Subsequently, whenever someone came to Mecca to perform pilgrimage, they would carry away stones and idols from the away as a token of reverence and affection. This caused the spread of idolatrous and polytheistic practices and led to the forgetting of the original faith of Abraham. This story is also known from the writings of Ibn Ishaq.

The second, and longer, explanation begins early on. Adam's ancestors through his two sons Seth and Cain (Qābīl) undergo different paths relative to the original, true faith. While Seth's descendants maintain their faith, Cain's descendants begin to create statues of their ancestors for innocent reasons (to remember them). As time passes on, people begin to venerate these statues in the hope that they will intercede on their behalf. Later still, this evolves into idol worship. The second version reported by Ibn al-Kalbi has been compared to a legend of the origins of idolatry in the Syriac Cave of Treasures, especially through its early Arabic translation as the Kitāb al-Majāll. It has also been compared to another legend about the origins of idolatry described by the 5th-century historian Sozomen.

=== Kaabas ===
According to Ibn Al-Kalbi, many Kaabas permeated pre-Islamic Arabia, buildings that (along with the Kaaba of Mecca) share a similar architectural style, such as the Kaaba of Najran. For Ibn al-Kalbi and Al-Azraqi, Hubal was the primary god of Meccan Kaaba in the worship of its Quraysh tribe. Other Muslim sources add other deities and baetyls in being venerated alongside Hubal. Archaeologically, Hubal is only mentioned in one of the pre-Islamic Arabian inscriptions: a Nabataean text which uses 'Hubal' as an epithet for another god, Dushara.

=== Physical idols ===
Ibn al-Kalbi writes that an idol, or an aṣnām, is a venerated figurine resembling a human that is made out of wood, gold, or silver. However, if made of stone, it is called an awthān. In the Quran, the words used for 'idol' or 'statue' include wathan (plural awthān) and ṣanam (plural aṣnām). These terms are used primarily in describing those who lived in past ages (with the exception of Quran 22:30), whereas it uses terms such as ṭāghūt and jibt for contemporary situations, although the precise meaning of both terms is imprecise and the latter is a hapax legomenon (meaning it is only used once) that appears in Quran 4:51. These two terms might be used to describe some kind of accusation of idolatry against rival monotheistic groups.

== Reception ==
With the exception of Al-Masudi (d. 956) and Yaqut al-Hamawi (d. 1229), the Book of Idols was largely unknown among Islamic scholars until a manuscript of it was discovered in Egypt and published in the 20th century. Yaqut quoted the text extensively in his Ma'jum al-buldan, to the degree that Julius Wellhausen (1844–1918) was able to work with Ibn al-Kalbi's work through Yaqut's citations before its main manuscript was discovered.

== Reliability ==
Ibn al-Kalbi's Book of Idols is considered unreliable as a source about pre-Islamic Arabian religion by some scholars. Islamic traditions about an idolatrous past came to first be seriously studied by Gerald Hawting, in his book The Idea of Idolatry and the Emergence of Islam (1999). For Hawting, accusations of idolatry against the pre-Islamic Arabian past were absent from the Quran and depend on later Islamic sources. According to Hawting, accusations of idolatry were common rhetorical weapons against other monotheistic competitors. Due to this phenomenon, the Quranic mushrikun were transformed, after a long period of oral transmission and development in tradition, into polytheistic idol worshippers. Therefore, for historians like Hawting, depictions of pre-Islamic Arabian religion like that in Ibn al-Kalbi's Book of Idols are not reliable representations of the past. Furthermore, as opposed to it being a collection of Arabian traditions about Arabian religion, it is better understood as "a collection of characteristic monotheistic traditions and ideas adapted to reflect Muslim concepts and concerns". Hawting believes that some of the names of gods in tradition may be historical, but that such names may have been deduced from the theophoric names of contemporary Arabs. Islamic traditions about these gods, in turn, reflect later elaboration and speculation built on top of deductions of the existence of such gods from such theophoric names.

The genealogies of the Book of Idols are, broadly, unreliable and do not correlate with epigraphic evidence, with possible isolated exceptions. Likewise, Christian J. Robin and Jérémie Schiettecatte found that the genealogical origins of an ultimate ancestor named Sheba in the Book of Idols, stated to be the third descendant of Qahtan (the mythical ancestor of the Southern Arabs), was a later, speculative reconstruction deduced from vague memories of geographical proximities and political alliances. Already, the inaccuracy of Ibn al-Kalbi's genealogical information was criticized in the 9th century, in the Antiquities of South Arabia by Al-Hamdani.

Archaeology also conflicts with Ibn al-Kalbi. Of all the gods and idols mentioned by Ibn al-Kalbi, the only ones that are clearly attested in pre-Islamic inscriptions are the eight already mentioned in the Quran (Quran 53:19–20; 71:23). The remaining eight deities, likely borrowed from embellished traditions built on the Quranic attestation, are not attested in worship after the fourth century. In the same century, South Arabia sharply broke away from polytheism in the reign of Malkikarib Yuhamin, meanwhile Ibn al-Kalbi depicts it as pagan and polytheistic long after this time.

Furthermore, Ibn al-Kalbi's association of pre-Islamic Hudhalī poetry with polytheism contradicts what is seen in other collections of Hudhalī poetry. Ibn al-Kalbi's depiction of the ritual cult stones and statues across Arabia is archaeologically unattested anywhere in Arabia in any period outside of northwest Arabia and Nabataea. Thus, Christian Julien Robin interprets Ibn al-Kalbi as having exaggerated the spatial extent of such practices and the use of these ritual objects more generally.

Ahmad Al-Jallad and Hythem Sidky give a social explanation for why Ibn al-Kalbi, and his contemporaries, were unable to access the religious history of Arabia's pre-Islamic past:

By ibn al‐Kalbī’s time, memory of authentic, late antique Arabian syncretic belief (širk) had been all but forgotten in the wake of the total Islamicization of Mecca. As such, there was no community to preserve ancient theological understandings, nor was there any practical purpose to do so. While ibn al‐Kalbī had access to the names of genuine pre‐Islamic Arabian gods from the Quran, his only way to understand them was through the ‘memories’ of his contemporaries, which reflected the practice of venerating superstitious objects and talismans and not the cults of the ancient gods, by that time long forgotten. Thus, Allāt and her sisters were fit into the model of umm al‐ġayṯ. They became featureless, stereotyped superstitious objects: rocks, trees, and so forth. With their original mythologies forgotten, they took on new roles in the story of the rise of Islam, acting as antagonists to face off against Mohammed’s generals. Their destruction served a literary function, symbolizing the end of idolatry in Arabia.

== Related Islamic writings ==
Alongside Ibn al-Kalbi's Book of Idols, the main Muslim sources for (especially polytheistic) religion in pre-Islamic Arabia include the writings of Al-Tabari (primarily his History of the Prophets and Kings) and Ibn Ishaq (Al-Sirah al-Nabawiyyah). There is also the Book of Reports about Mecca by Al-Azraqi. Additional attempts to describe pre-Islamic Arabian religion include those by the likes of Masʿūdī (d. 345/956), Shahrastānī (d. 548/1153), and even Muhammad ibn Abd al-Wahhab (d. 1206/1792), the founder of Wahhabism. Al-Jahiz (d. 868) is said to have composed a work with the same title as Ibn al-Kalbi's, but it is lost.

== Translations ==
- Faris, Nabih Amin (1952). Hishām Ibn-Al-Kalbi, The Book of Idols or The Kitāb al-Aṣnām. Princeton: Princeton UP. English translation.

== Editions ==
- Ibn Al-Kalbī, Kitāb al-Aṣnām, ed. R. Klinke-Rosenberger. Leipzig: O. Harrassowitz, 1941.
- Ibn al-Kalbī, Hishām ibn Muḥammad ibn al-Sāʾib. Kitab al-Aṣnām: ʿAn Abī al-Mundhir Hishām ibn Muḥammad ibn al-Sāʾib al-Kalbī. Edited by Aḥmad Zakī. 3rd ed. Cairo: Maṭbaʿat Dār al-Kutub al-Miṣriyyah, 1995.

== See also ==
- Al-Sirah al-Nabawiyyah (Ibn Ishaq)
- Crowns from the Accounts of the Yemen and the Genealogies of Himyar (Al-Hamdani)
- History of al-Ya'qubi
- History of the Prophets and Kings
- The Book of Crowns on the Kings of Himyar

== Additional literature ==
- H. S. Nyberg. "Bemerkungen zum Buch der Götzenbilder von Ibn al-Kalbi." Lund: Svenska Institut i Rom. Ser. 2, Bd. 1, 1939. pp. 346–66.
