= Lote tree =

Lote tree may refer to:

- Ziziphus spina-christi, Ziziphus lotus, or jujube, Mediterranean trees in the buckthorn family Rhamnaceae
  - Sidrat al-Muntaha, a lote tree mentioned in the Quran
- Celtis australis, a European tree in the family Cannabaceae

== See also ==
- Lotebush or Ziziphus obtusifolia, a species of flowering plant in the buckthorn family, native to the Americas
