= Temple of Nakrah =

Archaeological site in Yemen

- Interactive map of Temple of Nakrah
- 16.018333°N 44.804444°E
- Type: Temple
- Cultures: Minaeans
- Location: Barāqish
- Region: Al Jawf Governorate

History
- Built: 6th century BC
- Abandoned: 18th century

Site notes
- Length: 12 m (39 ft)
- Width: 11 m (36 ft)
- Archaeologists: Alessandro de Maigret
- Discovered: 1990-1992
- Condition: Restored (2003–2004); Bombarded (2015)

The Minean Temple of Nakrah was a large square temple built by the Minaeans in the city of Barāqish in what is now Yemen.

== History ==
The temple was built by Minaeans during the 6th century BC. During medieval times, the temple was damaged by an earthquake.

In 1986, the qadi Ismaïl Ali al-Akwa tasked the Italian archaeologist Alessandro de Maigret to excavate the site of Barāqish, who discovered the temple in 1990 and 1992 (Italian Archaeological Mission or Istituto Italiano per il Medio de Estremo Oriente. It is one of three temples in that city to have been discovered. 10 years after its discovery, funds were raised by the Yemeni and Italian governments to restore the temple in 2003 and 2004.

The temple is reported as being badly destroyed by the ongoing Yemen Civil War having been bombed by the Saudi Arabian military as it was being used by Houthi forces.

== Description ==
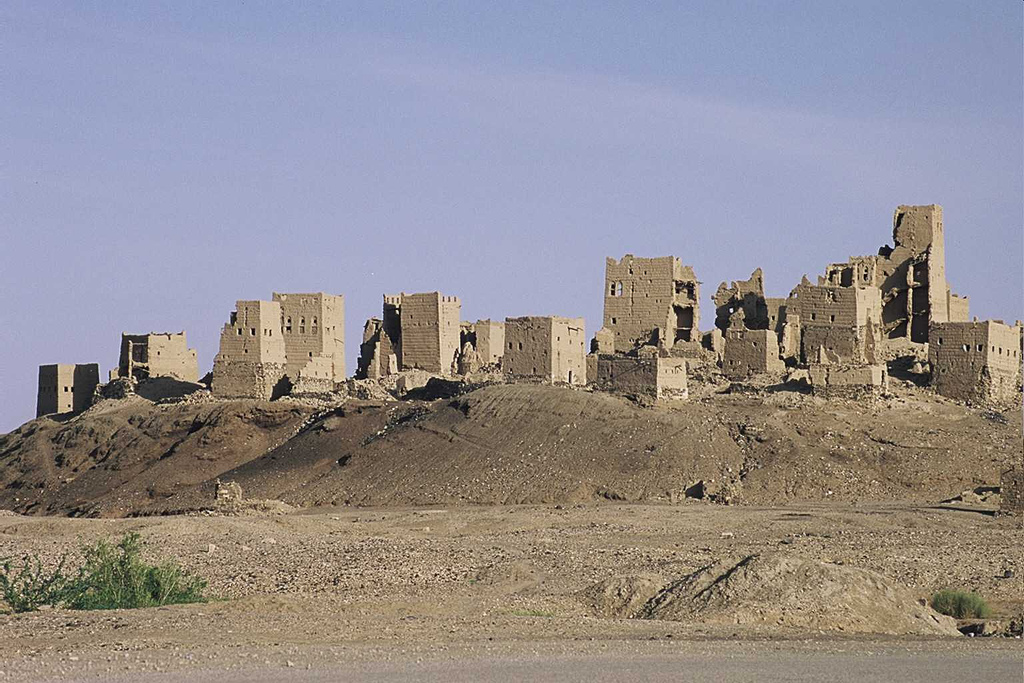
Ruins of Baraqish.

The temple's dimensions are almost square (12 by 11 metres or 39 by 36 feet) and it was composed of twelve monolithic pillars. Fourteen statuettes (human figures, measuring 7 to 16 centimetres or 2.8 to 6.3 inches) were unearthed in the close vicinity of the temple, made of stucco-layered terracotta or just stucco.

Baraqish is the best-preserved ancient walled town in Yemen. It once had more than fifty towers and two gates, and its walls reached a height of up to 14 metres (46 ft). Located in the wide Wadi Fardha, it was previously known as Yathil, the dominant town in the Minean kingdom and an important centre on the incense route.

== Bibliography ==
- Alessandro de Maigret, The excavations of the temple of Nakrah at Baraqish, Archaeopress, Proceedings of the Seminar for Arabian Studies, Vol. 21, Proceedings of the Twenty Fourth SEMINAR FOR ARABIAN STUDIES held at Oxford on 24th - 26th July 1990 (1991), pp. 159-172 (14 pages)
- (in French) Alessandro de Maigret, Christian Robin, Le temple de Nakrah à Yathill (aujourd'hui Barāqish), Yémen. Résultats des deux premières campagnes de fouilles de la mission italienne, Comptes rendus des séances de l'Académie des Inscriptions et Belles-Lettres, 1993 137-2 pp. 427-496
