= Nisroch =

God of Agriculture

Nisroch (Hebrew: נִסְרֹךְ, romanized: Nīsrōḵ; Koine Greek: Νεσεραχ; Latin: Nesroch) was, according to the Hebrew Bible, a god of Assyria in whose temple King Sennacherib was worshiping when he was assassinated by his sons Adrammelech and Sharezer (2 Kings 19:37, Isaiah 37:38).

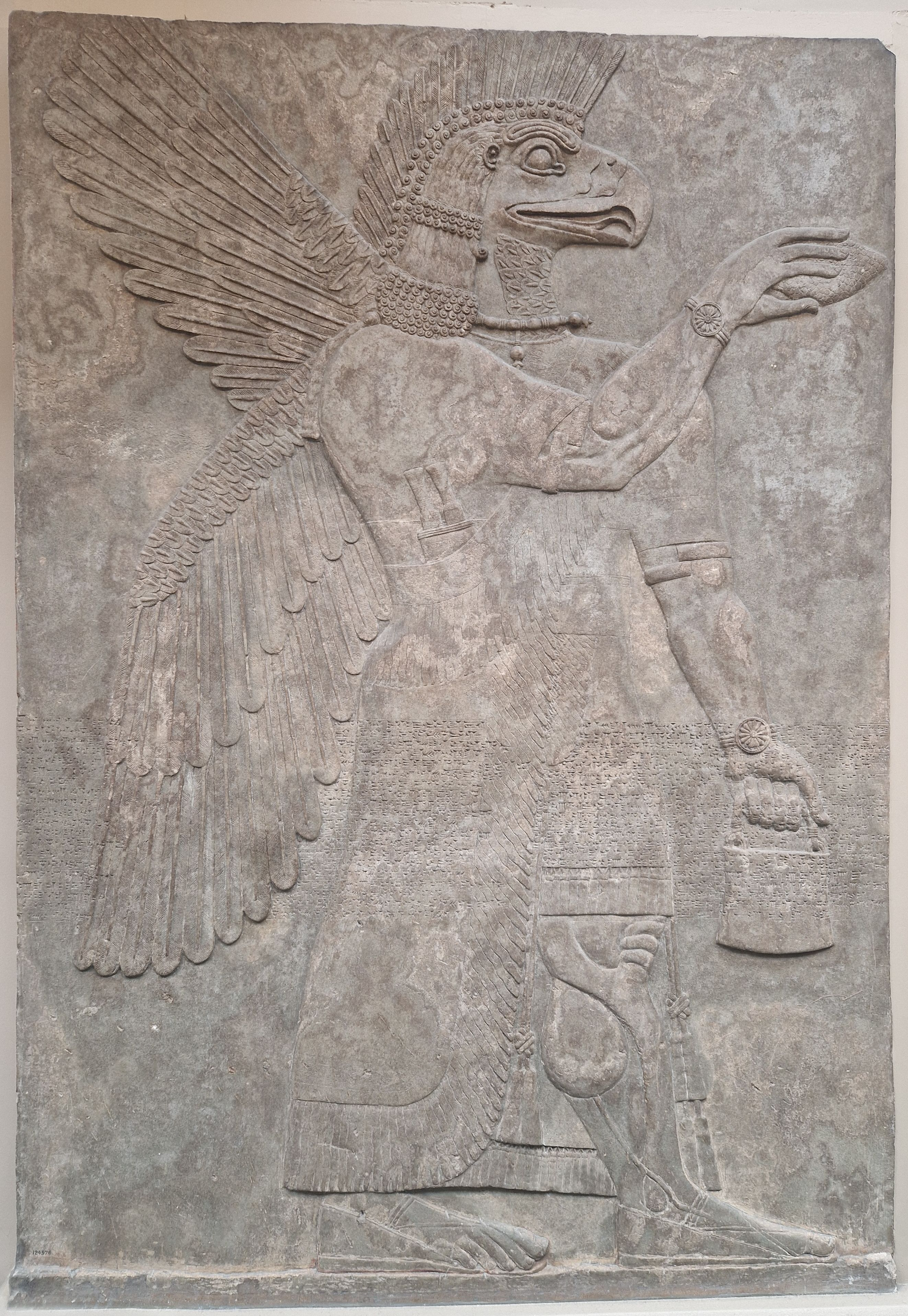
Eagle-Headed Assyrian God relief

The name is most likely a scribal error for "Nimrod". This hypothetical error would result from the Hebrew letter מ (mem) being replaced with ס (samekh) and the letter ד (dalet) being replaced with ך (kaf). (נסרך for נמרד) Due to the obvious visual similarities of the letters involved and the fact that no Assyrian deity by the name of "Nisroch" has ever been attested, most scholars consider this error to be the most likely explanation for the name.

The name is unknown in Mesopotamian sources, but it has been tentatively identified as the god of agriculture. If "Nisroch" is Ninurta, this would make Ninurta's temple at Kalhu the most likely location of Sennacherib's murder. Other scholars have attempted to identify Nisroch as Nusku, the Assyrian god of fire. Hans Wildberger rejects all suggested identifications as linguistically implausible.

== Talmudic legend ==
In the Talmud, "Nisroch" is actually said to be derived from the Hebrew word "neser." Neser was the name given to a plank of wood discovered by Sennacherib on his return to Assyria from his campaign in Judah. The sages write that this plank was originally part of Noah's Ark, and that Sennacherib worshiped it as an idol. It would therefore be concluded that it was this idol that Sennacherib was worshiping when he was murdered by his two sons.

== Nisroch as a demon ==
In the sixteenth century, Nisroch became seen as a demon. The Dutch demonologist Johann Weyer listed Nisroch in his Pseudomonarchia Daemonum (1577) as the "chief cook" of Hell. Nisroch appears in Book VI of John Milton's epic poem Paradise Lost (first published in 1667) as one of Satan's demons. Nisroch, who is described as frowning and wearing beaten armor, calls into question Satan's argument that the fight between the angels and demons is equal, objecting that they, as demons, can feel pain, which will break their morale. According to Milton scholar Roy Flannagan, Milton may have chosen to portray Nisroch as timid because he had consulted the Hebrew dictionary of C. Stephanus, which defined the name "Nisroch" as "Flight" or "Delicate Temptation".

In the 1840s, the British archaeologist Austen Henry Layard uncovered numerous stone carvings of winged, eagle-headed genii at Kalhu. Remembering the Biblical story of Sennacherib's murder, Layard mistakenly identified these figures as "Nisrochs". Such carvings continued to be known as "Nisrochs" in popular literature throughout the remaining portion of the nineteenth century. In Edith Nesbit's classic 1906 children's novel The Story of the Amulet, the child protagonists summon an eagle-headed "Nisroch" to guide them. Nisroch opens a portal and advises them, "Walk forward without fear" and asks, "Is there aught else that the Servant of the great Name can do for those who speak that name?" Some modern works on art history still repeat the old misidentification, but Near Eastern scholars now generally refer to the "Nisroch" figure as a "griffin-demon".

== See also ==
- Ancient Mesopotamian religion
- Nasr
