= The Idea of Idolatry and the Emergence of Islam =

1999 book by G. R. Hawting

The Idea of Idolatry and the Emergence of Islam is a 1999 book in the field of Quranic studies published by G. R. Hawting.

Hawting explores and compares how the Quran and later Islamic tradition portray ideas of paganism and idolatry in the milieu of Pre-Islamic Arabia. In doing so, Hawting pioneered a new approach that sees the opponents of Muhammad in Mecca, the mušrikīn, as imperfect monotheists as opposed to polytheists, an idea that Hawting argues is an embellishment of later Islamic historiography, including the biographies of Muhammad (sirah), the exegetical tradition on the Quran (tafsir), and dedicated works such as the Book of Idols of Hisham ibn al-Kalbi.

== Thesis ==
Hawting argues that the Islamic perspective on monotheism emerged from a formative period of inter-monotheistic competition/debate, which he sometimes likens to the disputes about monotheism between 16th-century Protestants and Catholics. This, Hawting argues, is in opposition to the traditional view of the emergence of Islamic monotheism against a polytheistic background. The associators ("mushrikūn") described in the Quran are not polytheists, per Hawting, but fellow monotheists who believed in the supremacy of Allah but made the mistake of associating with him the veneration of lower, angelic beings. Finally, he geographically situates this competition among Middle Eastern confessional communities in the eighth or ninth centuries (following John Wansbrough's position in Quranic Studies (1977)) instead of the Arabian Peninsula in the seventh-century.

== Reception and subsequent scholarship ==
Criticism of Hawting often focuses on a brief comment that his findings (the monotheistic milieu of the Quran) implies it originated outside of (polytheistic) Arabia. While Hawting's findings about the Quran have been praised, Fred Donner says no evidence for an extra-Arabian origins is offered by Hawting. Yasin Dutton considers this re-placement tenuous and speculative.

Patricia Crone refined Hawting's argument for a monotheistic milieu for the Quran. Crone drew on recent developments in the study of late antique religion that established the prevalence of "pagan monotheism", people who embraced monotheism without converting to Judaism or Christianity, known in antiquity as the God Fearers. Hawting and Crone both argue that the three Quranic "female goddesses" of Surah 53—Al-Lat, Al-Uzza, and Manat—were only angels, subordinate to Allah, not independently acting beings, but instead, played the role of intercession between Allah and believers, a conclusion that could be supported by comparison with the theology of angels by the "God Fearers".

Another of Hawting's contentious findings is that the Jahiliyyah narratives of religion in pre-Islamic Arabia are fictional. While accepted by Nicolai Sinai, Michael Lecker and Aziz al-Azmeh both resisted these findings. In later years, the study of pre-Islamic Arabia experienced a "material turn": instead of arguing about the interpretation of the Quran and a subjective weighing of later Islamic sources, historians were increasingly finding large numbers of pre-Islamic Arabian inscriptions. Now, the debate about the religion of the pre-Islamic Arabs could be based on their own, contemporary expressions, instead of external sources from later periods. This new data has revealed the complete disappearance of references to pagan gods or the old Arabian pantheon between the fourth and sixth centuries, including inscriptions created in the writing script that the Quran itself would be written into, later: Paleo-Arabic. This is broadly seen as supporting Hawting. Support has also come from the study of pre-Islamic Arabic poetry.

== See also ==
- Geschichte des Qorāns
- Hadith studies
