= Suwa' =

Pre-Islamic Arabian Idol

Suwāʿ (Arabic: سواع) or Soveh, if translated to English, is mentioned in the Qur'an (71:23) as a deity of the time of the Prophet Noah.

And they say: Forsake not your gods, nor forsake Wadd, nor Suwa', nor Yaghuth and Ya'uq and Nasr. (Qur'an 71:23)

Maulana Muhammad Ali of the Ahmadiyya community, adds the following commentary on the passage:

The names of the idols given here are those which existed in Arabia in the Prophet's time, and hence some critics call it an anachronism. [...] According to IʿAb, the idols of Noah's people were worshipped by the Arabs, Wadd being worshipped by Kalb, Suwāʿ by Hudhail, Yaghūth by Murād, Yaʿūq by Hamadān and Nasr by Ḥimyar (B. 65:lxxi, 1). The commentators say that Wadd was worshipped in the form of a man, Suwāʿ in that of a woman, Yaghūth in that of a lion, Yaʿūq in that of a horse and Nasr in that of an eagle (Rz).

The temple dedicated to Suwāʿ was demolished on the orders of Muhammad, in the Raid of Amr ibn al-As, in January 630 AD, 8AH, 9th month, of the Islamic Calendar.
