= Sidrat al-Muntaha =

Islamic mythological tree

A cedar in Lebanon (Lebanon's sacred tree); Translations made through modern Arabic, unaware of the cultural background and etymological development of the words and symbols that make up the language of the Quran, can turn "Sidrat al-Muntaha" into the lote tree.

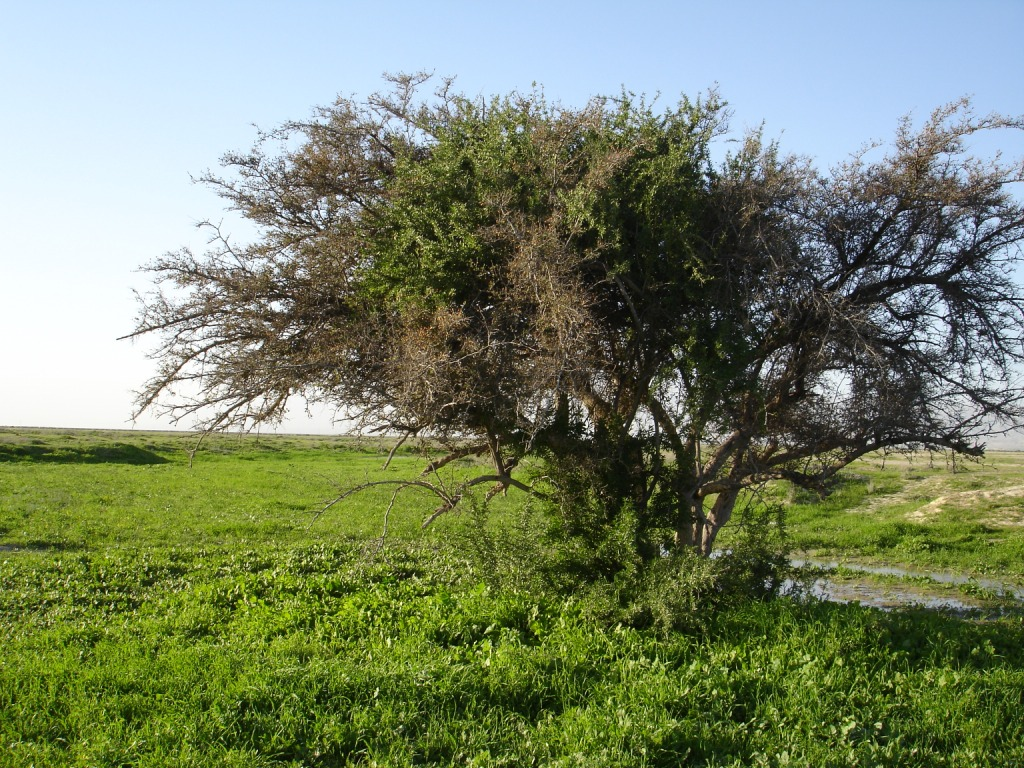
Wild Ziziphus spina-christi (lote tree) in Iran

The Sidrat al-Muntaha (Arabic: سِدْرَة ٱلْمُنْتَهَىٰ, romanized: Sidrat al-Muntahā, lit. 'Sidr Tree of the Farthest Boundary') in Islamic tradition is a large Cedrus or lote tree (Ziziphus spina-christi) that marks the utmost boundary in the seventh heaven, where the knowledge of the angels ends. During the Isra' and Mi'raj, when Muhammad entered Heaven alive, Muhammad is said to have travelled with the Archangel Gabriel to the tree where Gabriel stopped. Beyond the tree, God instructed Muhammad about the salah (daily prayers).

The Lote Tree of the Furthest Boundary is also used to refer to the Manifestation of God several times in Bahá’í literature.

== Quran ==
The tree is also referred to in Sura 53 verse 14–16, Sura 34 verse 16 and Sura 56, verse 28.

Sura 53, verses 11-18 reads:

11. The ˹Prophet’s˺ heart did not doubt what he saw.
12. How can you ˹O pagans˺ then dispute with him regarding what he saw?
13. And he certainly saw that ˹angel descend˺ a second time
14. at the Lote Tree of the most extreme limit ˹in the seventh heaven˺—
15. near which is the Garden of ˹Eternal˺ Residence—
16. while the Lote Tree was overwhelmed with ˹heavenly˺ splendours!
17. The ˹Prophet’s˺ sight never wandered, nor did it overreach.
18. He certainly saw some of his Lord’s greatest signs.

— Quran 53:11–18 (Translated by Dr. Mustafa Khattab)

Sura 34, verses 15-17 reads:

15. There was a sign for the people of Sheba, too, in their dwelling place: two gardens, one on the right, one on the left: ‘Eat from what your Lord has provided for you and give Him thanks, for your land is good, and your Lord most forgiving.’
16. But they paid no heed, so We let loose on them a flood from the dam and replaced their two gardens with others that yielded bitter fruit, tamarisk bushes, and a few lote trees.
17. In this way We punished them for their ingratitude- would We punish anyone but the ungrateful?

— Quran 34:15–17 (Translated by Abdul Haleem)

Sura 56, verses 27-34 reads:

27. And the people of the right—how ˹blessed˺ will they be!
28. ˹They will be˺ amid thornless lote trees,
29. clusters of bananas,
30. extended shade,
31. flowing water,
32. abundant fruit—
33. never out of season nor forbidden—
34. and elevated furnishings.

— Quran 56:27–34 (Translated by Dr. Mustafa Khattab)

== Meaning ==
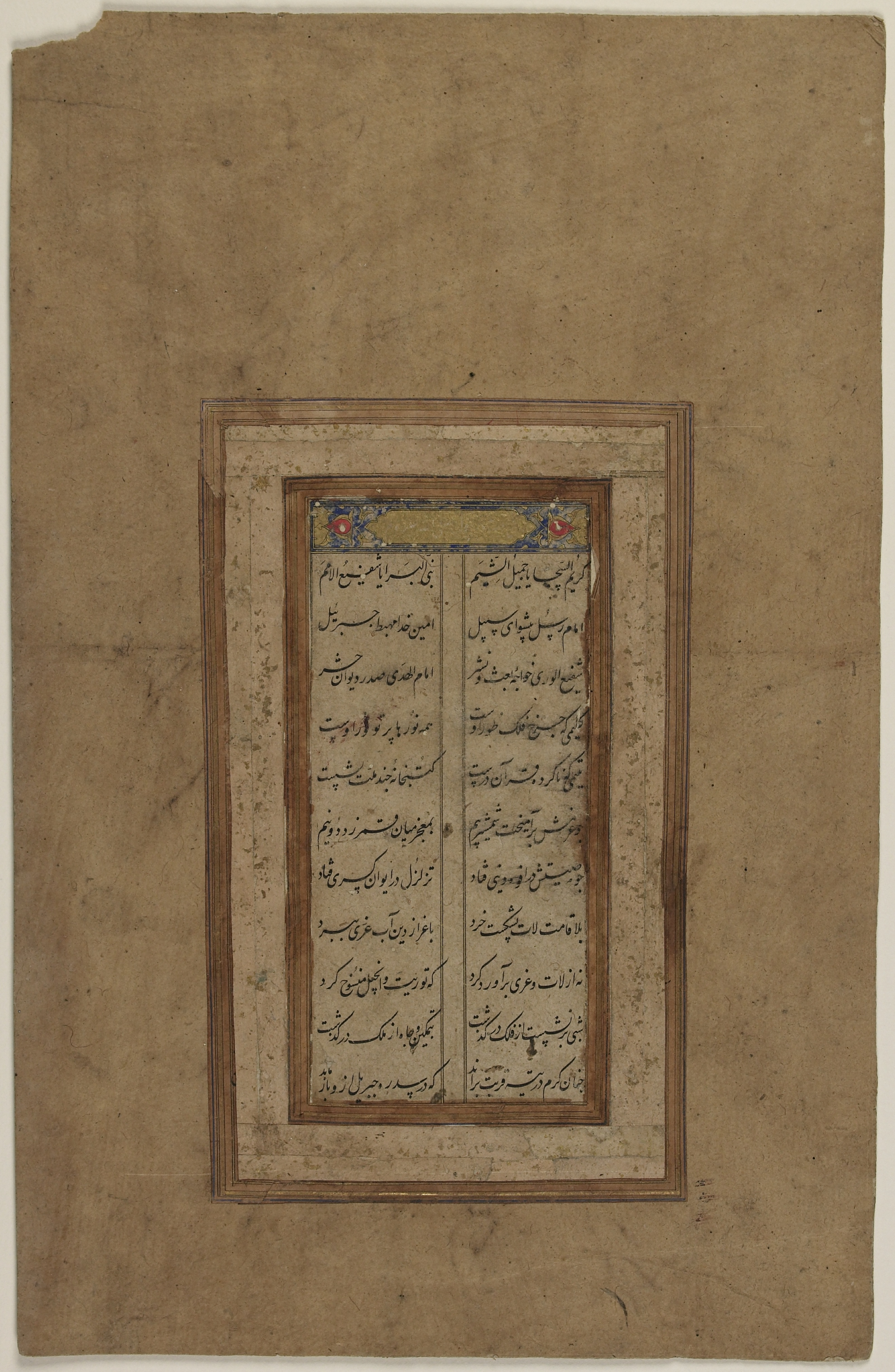
A page of Bustan by the Persian poet Saadi Shirazi telling the story of the lote tree

A tafsir entitled Tafsīr al-karīm al-raḥman fī tafsīr kalām al-manān by the Salafi scholar Abdul-Rahman al-Sa'di (d. 1957), while commenting on Quran 53:14 said:

It [the Sidrat al-Muntahā] is a very large Tree (شَجَرَة - shajarah) beyond the 7th heaven. It is named the Sidrat al-Muntahā because there terminates at it whatever ascends from the earth and whatever descends [from heaven] including what comes down from God, including waḥy (divine inspiration) and other things besides. Alternatively, [it might be said that this name is because] it is the Uttermost Extremity or the very end of something [or Boundary] (اِنْتِهاء - intihā' which is one of the many Arabic words for the word end) for the knowledge of the creatures approaching it, relative, that is, to its Existent Being [as located] above the heavens and the earth. So it is al-Muntahā (the Extremity, Boundary) with respect to [all human] modes of knowledge (عُلُوم - ʻulūm) or other things besides. And God is best informed [of this matter]. Thus [it was that] Muhammad saw Gabriel in that location (الْمَكَان - al-makān) which is the Domain of the Pure and Beautiful, Elevated [celestial] Souls (مَحَلُّ الْأَرْوَاحُ الْعُلُوِيَّةُ الْزَّكِيَّةُ الْجَمِيلِيَّة - maḥall al-arwāḥ al-ʻuluwiyyah al-zakiyyah al-jamīliyyah)...

— (As-Saʻdi, Tafsir, 819).

Abdullah Yusuf Ali, whose The Holy Qur'an: Text, Translation and Commentary is among the most widely known English versions of the Qur'an, explained that this tree "marked the bounds of heavenly knowledge as revealed to men, beyond which neither Angels nor men could pass."

George Sale, the 18th century English scholar, has "beyond which Angels themselves must not pass; or, as some rather imagine, beyond which no creature's knowledge can extend." Sale also notes that one commentator states that line 16 refers to the "host of angels worshipping" around the tree and another that it is about the birds which sit on its branches.

The 19th-century English explorer Richard Burton reported seeing an ancient Sidr tree in Al-Masjid Al-Nabawi in Madinah, in a garden dedicated to Muhammad's daughter Fatima. The fruit from the tree was being sold to pilgrims and its leaves used for washing dead bodies.

== Use as a symbol ==
The lote-tree is used as a symbol, for example, by the Qatar Foundation: "The Sidra tree, growing strong and proud in the harshest of environments, has been a symbol of perseverance and nourishment across the borders of the Arab world. What is the significance of this glorious tree? With its roots bound in the soil of this world and its branches reaching upwards toward perfection, it is a symbol of solidarity and determination; it reminds us that the goals of this world are not incompatible with the goals of the spirit." The evergreen tree Ziziphus spina-christi represents this symbol in natural form.

== See also ==
- Cedrus
- Plants in Islam
- Manifestation of God (Baháʼí Faith)
- Tree of life (Quran)
- Tree of life
- Jujube
- Ziziphus lotus
- Ziziphus spina-christi
