= Ya'uq =

Arabian deity

According to the Qur'an, Yaʿūq (Arabic: يعوق) or Jawc/Jawk/Jawkk, if translated to English, was an idol worshipped in the days of Noah. A synagogue dedicated to Rahmanan named Ya'uq is mentioned in a South Arabian inscription as "mkrbn yʿwq".

And they say: Forsake not your gods, nor forsake Wadd, nor Suwa', nor Yaghuth and Ya'uq and Nasr. (Qur'an 71:23)

Maulana Muhammad Ali adds the following commentary on the passage:

The names of the idols given here are those which existed in Arabia in the Prophet's time, and hence some critics call it an anachronism. [...] According to IʿAb, the idols of Noah's people were worshipped by the Arabs, Wadd being worshipped by Kalb, Suwāʿ by Hudhail, Yaghūth by Murād, Yaʿūq by Hamadān and Nasr by Ḥimyar (B. 65:lxxi, 1). The commentators say that Wadd was worshipped in the form of a man, Suwāʿ in that of a woman, Yaghūth in that of a lion, Yaʿūq in that of a horse and Nasr is that of an eagle (Rz).
