= Wadd =

Pre-Islamic Arabian moon-god

- God of the Moon
- Symbol: love, kindness, affection, crescent with the small disk of Venus

Wadd (Arabic: وَدّ) (Ancient South Arabian script: 𐩥𐩵) was the national god of the Kingdom of Ma'in, inhabited by the Minaean peoples, in modern-day South Arabia.

Wadd is mentioned once in the Quran as part of a list of five false gods worshipped by the people of Noah. In the Islamic era, it was believed that Wadd was worshipped by a tribe known as the Banu Kalb, with a central idol being stored at the city of Dumat al-Jandal, which is in northwestern Arabia. Accordingly, this idol is said to have been destroyed by the early general Khalid ibn al-Walid.

== Cult ==
Wadd was the national god of Ma'in, or the Minaeans; the magic formula Wd'b or "Wadd is [my?] father" was written on amulets and buildings. These writings were often accompanied with a symbol; a crescent moon with the small disc of Venus.

An altar dedicated to him was erected by Minaeans living on the Greek island of Delos. The altar contains two inscriptions, one of which is in Minaean language and the other in Greek. Minaean inscription on the altar begins with symbols of three Minaean god one of which is of Wadd whose symbol is a snake. The Minaean text on the altar reads, "Hāni' and Zayd'il [of the lineage] of Hab erected the altar of Wadd and of the deities of Ma'in at Delos." The Greek inscription reads, "[Property] of Oaddos, god of the Minaeans. To Oaddos." He was also worshipped by Minaean colonists in Dedan (modern-day Al-'Ula) during the Lihyanite rule. A temple of Wadd evidently existed in Dedan. There is evidence from Minaean inscriptions of the presence of Levites in the temple of Wadd who according to some scholars were either as priests or cult servants who could later be promoted to higher positions.

Wadd was also the national god of the Awsan kingdom. It is known that in the Hellenistic era, a king of Awsan was proclaimed as "son of (god) Wadd", receiving offerings as if he himself were a god.

== Islamic tradition ==
Wadd is mentioned in the Qur'an (71:23) as a deity of the time of Noah.

And they say: By no means leave your gods, nor leave Wadd, nor Suwa'; nor Yaghuth, and Ya'uq and Nasr. (Qur'an 71:23)

The theophoric name Abd Wadd is attested in the name of Amr ibn Abd Wadd, a champion of the tribe of Quraish who challenged the Muslims for a duel during the Battle of the Trench. Ali, Muhammad's son-in-law and cousin, accepted the challenge and killed Amr.

According to Hisham ibn al-Kalbi's Book of Idols, the Banu Kalb tribe worshipped Wadd in the form of a man and is said to have represented heaven. His idol and temple stood in Dumat al-Jandal, and Malik ibn Harithah, a former devotee of Wadd, describes his idol:

lt was the statue of a huge man, as big as the largest of human beings, covered with two robes, clothed with the one and cloaked with the other, carrying a sword on his waist and a bow on his shoulder, and holding in [one] hand a spear to which was attached a standard, and [in the other] a quiver full of arrows.

The temple dedicated to Wadd was demolished on the orders of Muhammad in the expedition of Khalid ibn al-Walid (2nd Dumatul Jandal).

== See also ==
- List of lunar deities

== Sources ==
- The Book of Idols (Kitab Al-Asnam) by Hisham Ibn Al-Kalbi
