= Yaghūth =

Deity

Yaghūth (Arabic "He Helps" يَغُوثَ) or Jageth, if translated to English, was a deity or idol referred to in the Quran (71:23). The Quran mentions him and 4 other idols later worshipped by people who were deceived by Satan in Islam. They were possibly worshipped by Pre-Islamic Arabian tribes or in Mesopotamia and Turkey.

These 5 idols were mentioned, when Noah preached about to worship the one true God Allah, the people of Noah said to each other that they should not stop worshipping or forsake those 5 persons. Later, the people of Noah got destroyed by the Great Flood.

as a god of the era of the Islamic prophet Noah:

And they say: Forsake not your gods, nor forsake Wadd, nor Suwa', nor Yaghuth and Ya'uq and Nasr. (Qur'an 71:23)

Maulana Muhammad Ali comments:

The names of the idols given here are those which existed in Arabia in the Prophet's time, and hence some critics call it an anachronism. [...] According to IʿAb, the idols of Noah's people were worshipped by the Arabs, Wadd being worshipped by Kalb, Suwāʿ by Hudhail, Yaghūth by Murād, Yaʿūq by Hamadān and Nasr by Ḥimyar (B. 65:lxxi, 1). The commentators say that Wadd was worshipped in the form of a man, Suwāʿ in that of a woman, Yaghūth in that of a lion, Yaʿūq in that of a horse and Nasr in that of an eagle (Rz).
