= Nasr (deity) =

Pre-Islamic Arabian deity

According to the Quran, Nasr (Arabic: نسر) was a pre-Islamic Arabian deity at the time of Noah:

"وقالوا لا تذرن آلهتكم ولا تذرن ودا ولا سواعا ولا يغوث ويعوق ونسرا
And they say: Forsake not your gods, nor forsake Wadd, nor Suwāʿ, nor Yaghūth and Yaʿūq and Nasr."^{[Quran 71:23]}

== In Balkha ==
Hisham ibn Al-Kalbi's Book of Idols describes a temple to Nasr at Balkha, an otherwise unknown location.

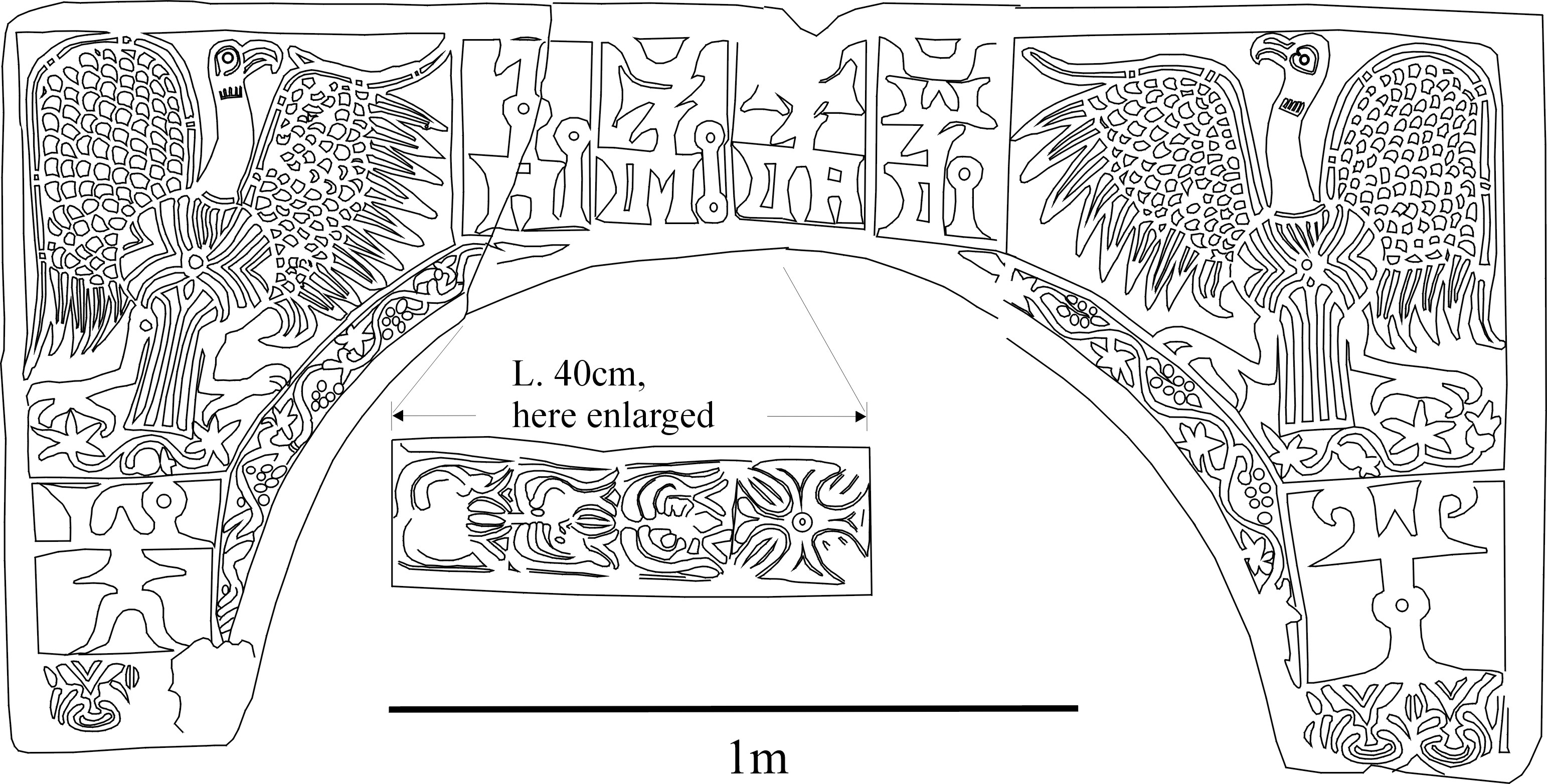
Vulture (nasr) reliefs from Himyar

== In Himyar ==
Reliefs depicting vultures (nasr) have been found in Himyar, including at Maṣna'at Māriya and Haddat Gulays, and Nasr appears in theophoric names. Some sources attribute the deity to "the dhū-l-Khila tribe of Himyar". Himyaritic inscriptions were thought to describe "the vulture of the east" and "the vulture of the west", which Augustus Henry Keane interpreted as solstitial worship; however these are now thought to read "eastward" and "westward" with n-s-r as a preposition. (Note: In a separate challenge to the theory of solstitial worship, Ḥisda relays that Ḥanan b. Rava interpreted Abba b. Aybo's claim that the temple was permanent (v.i.) to mean "constantly worshipped for the entire year." This is accepted by Shlomo b. Yiṣḥaq, who notes, "permanent -- all year, for every day of the year would their worshippers make a festival and bring sacrifices".) J. Spencer Trimingham believed Nasr was "a symbol of the sun".

== In Hatra ==
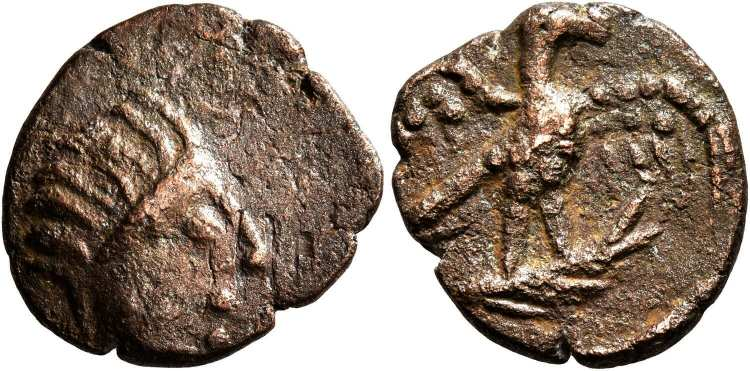
Vulture relief on the reverse of a coin found at Hatra

Nasr has been identified by some scholars with Maren-Shamash, who is often flanked by vultures in depictions at Hatra. Coins depicting vultures were also found at Hatra.

== Nishra ==
Many scholars suggest that Nasr should be identified with Nishra (Jewish Babylonian Aramaic: נשרא, romanized: nishra, lit. 'vulture'), an idol mentioned by Aramaic texts.

=== In "Arabia" ===
An "Arabian" vulture-god is mentioned by the Babylonian Talmud and the Doctrine of Addai. This "Arabia" may be Arbayistan. The Talmud, Avodah Zarah 11b, reads:

Ḥanan b. Ḥisda says that Abba b. Aybo says, and some say it was Ḥanan b. Rava who said that Abba b. Aybo says, "There are five permanent idolatrous temples: the temple of Bel in Babylon, the temple of Nebo in Borsippa (Note: Printings and some MSS read כורסי Kursi, a scatological quip (Kursi resembles both the Aramaic בורסי\ף Borsippa and the Biblical Hebrew קורס squat). Borsippa's name is the butt of several Talmudic jokes; it is also called Bolsippa (as in, Balal S'fas jumbled the language of) and Bor Shapi Empty Pit.), the temple of Atargatis in Manbij, the temple of Serapis (Note: Aramaic: צריפא (hapax). The reading Serapis is supported by: Shaick, Ronit Palistrant. "Who is Standing Above the Lions in Ascalon?". Israel Numismatic Research, 7, 2012.; Rodan, Simona (2019-09-30). Maritime-Related Cults in the Coastal Cities of Philistia during the Roman Period: Legacy and Change. Archaeopress Publishing Ltd. ISBN 978-1-78969-257-0.; Macalister, Robert Alexander Stewart (1980). The Philistines: Their History and Civilization. Library of Alexandria. ISBN 978-1-4655-1749-4.; Greenfield, Jonas Carl (2001). 'Al Kanfei Yonah. BRILL. ISBN 978-90-04-12170-6.; Clermont-Ganneau, Charles (1897). Bibliothèque de l'Ecole des hautes études...: Sciences philologiques et historiques (in French). aE. Bouillon.; Bochart argues for the emendation Aphrodite Urania based on Herodotus' identification of the Ashkelon temple in his Histories (1:105), some 750 years prior. See Venus Castina.: Bochart, Samuel (1712). Samuelis Bocharti Opera omnia. Hoc est Phaleg, Chanaan, et Hierozoicon. Quibus accesserunt Dissertationes variae ad illustrationem sacri codicis aliorumque monumentorum veterum. Praemittitur vita auctoris à Stephano Morino descripta...viri clarissimi Johannes Leusden & Petrus de Villemandy. Editio quarta (in Latin). apud Cornelium Boutesteyn, & Samuelem Luchtmans.) in Ashkelon, and the temple of Nishra (Note: Aramaic: נשרא (hapax). The reading vulture-god is supported by: Bochart, Samuel (1712). Samuelis Bocharti Opera omnia. Hoc est Phaleg, Chanaan, et Hierozoicon. Quibus accesserunt Dissertationes variae ad illustrationem sacri codicis aliorumque monumentorum veterum. Praemittitur vita auctoris à Stephano Morino descripta...viri clarissimi Johannes Leusden & Petrus de Villemandy. Editio quarta (in Latin). apud Cornelium Boutesteyn, & Samuelem Luchtmans.; The Journal of Philology. Macmillan and Company. 1880.; Greenfield, Jonas Carl (2001). 'Al Kanfei Yonah. BRILL. ISBN 978-90-04-12170-6.; Epstein, Isidore (1935). The Babylonian Talmud ... Soncino Press.; Neubauer, Adolf (1868). La Géographie du Talmud (in French). Michel Lévy frères. ISBN 978-90-6041-048-6.; Hastings, James (1908). Encyclopaedia of Religion and Ethics: A-Art. C. Scribner's sons.; Clermont-Ganneau, Charles (1897). Bibliothèque de l'Ecole des hautes études...: Sciences philologiques et historiques (in French). aE. Bouillon.; The emendation Dushara is supported by: Rodan, Simona (2019-09-30). Maritime-Related Cults in the Coastal Cities of Philistia during the Roman Period: Legacy and Change. Archaeopress Publishing Ltd. ISBN 978-1-78969-257-0; Kasher, Aryeh (1990). Jews and Hellenistic Cities in Eretz-Israel: Relations of the Jews in Eretz-Israel with the Hellenistic Cities During the Second Temple Period (332 BCE - 70 CE). Mohr Siebeck. ISBN 978-3-16-145241-3.) in Arabia".

A similar mention appears in the Doctrine of Addai:

Who is this Nebo, an idol made which ye worship, and Bel, which ye honor? (Note: rhet. Compare Isaiah 46:1) Behold, there are those among you who adore Bath Nical, as the inhabitants of Harran your neighbours, and Atargatis, as the people of Manbij, and Nishra, (Note: נשרא, same spelling as the Talmud. Identified as the vulture-god by Clemont-Ganneau, among others.) as the Arabians; also the sun and the moon, as the rest of the inhabitants of Harran, who are as yourselves.

=== In Kashkar ===
In the Acts of Mar Mari, which derives from the Doctrine, Mari Mari is told to "Convert the city of Kashkar, where a demon in the likeness of a nishra is worshipped and [where] a standard stands, on which there is an idol named Nishar (Note: ܢܝܫܲܪ)".

A Mandaean magical text reads "Bel is turned from Babylon, Nebo turned from Borsippa, Nishra (Note: נישרא) turned from Kashkar"; E. S. Dower says that "Nishra is obviously a corruption", and Walter Baumgartner agreed, but Jonas C. Greenfield and Yakir Paz identify it with Nasr.

=== In Persia ===
A further mention is found in one manuscript of Jacob of Serugh's On the Fall of the Idols, wherein the Persians are said to have been led by the devil to construct and worship Nishra. However, Abbé Martin prefers the reading of another manuscript, "Nisroch".
