= Murad (tribe) =

Yemeni tribe

The Murad (Arabic: مراد) are an Arab tribe of eastern Yemen.

The Murad belong to the southern group of the Madhhij. They are described as retaining a typically Beduin character and their territory, called Bilad Murad, lies in the governorate of Marib and parts of al-Baydha and Dhamar Governorates in northern Yemen.
