= Anti-Catholicism in literature and media =

Media hostile against Catholics or Catholicism

Anti-Catholicism in media, such as literature, film or television, has been prevalent. Polemics have also been written on the Church and its practices. Some examples are the anti-Catholic stereotypes that filled the Gothic fiction of Anglican England, the films of Luis Buñuel, who took issue with the Church in Spain, the humor of some US television pundits like Rosie O'Donnell, and the rhetoric of some fundamentalist preachers.

== Literature ==
Anti-Catholic stereotypes are a long-standing feature of English literature, popular fiction, and even pornography. Gothic fiction is particularly rich in this regard. Lustful priests, cruel abbesses, immured nuns, and sadistic inquisitors appear in such works as The Italian by Ann Radcliffe, The Monk by Matthew Lewis, Melmoth the Wanderer by Charles Maturin and The Pit and the Pendulum by Edgar Allan Poe.

Such gothic fiction may have inspired Rebecca Reed's Six Months in a Convent which describes her alleged captivity by an Ursuline order near Boston in 1832.

Reed's claims inspired an angry mob to burn down the convent, and her narrative, released three years later as the rioters were tried, famously sold 200,000 copies in one month. Reed's book was soon followed by another bestselling fraudulent exposé, Awful Disclosures of the Hotel-Dieu Nunnery (1836) in which Maria Monk claimed that the convent served as a harem for Catholic priests, and that any resulting children were murdered after baptism. Col. William Stone, a New York city newspaper editor, along with a team of Protestant investigators, inquired into Monk's claims, inspecting the convent in the process. Col. Stone's investigation concluded there was no evidence that Maria Monk "had ever been within the walls of the cloister".

Reed's book became a best-seller, and Monk or her handlers hoped to cash in on the evident market for anti-Catholic horror fiction. The tale of Maria Monk was, in fact, clearly modelled on the Gothic novels popular in the early 19th century. This literary genre had already been used for anti-Catholic sentiments in works such as Matthew Lewis' The Monk. Maria Monk's story exhibits the genre-defining elements of a young and innocent woman trapped in a remote, old, and gloomily picturesque estate; she learns the dark secrets of the place; after harrowing adventures she escapes.

The anti-Catholic Gothic tradition continued with Charlotte Brontë's semi-autobiographical novel Villette (1853). Bronte explores the culture clash between the heroine's English Protestantism and the Catholicism of the environment at her school in 'Villette' (aka Brussels) before magisterially pronouncing "God is not with Rome."

In a chapter of Fyodor Dostoevsky's The Brothers Karamazov called The Grand Inquisitor, the Catholic Church convicts a returned-from-Heaven Jesus Christ of heresy and is portrayed as a servant of Satan.

Dan Brown's best-selling novel The Da Vinci Code depicts the Catholic Church as determined to hide the truth about Mary Magdalene. An article in an April 2004 issue of National Catholic Register maintains that "The Da Vinci Code claims that Catholicism is a big, bloody, woman-hating lie created out of pagan cloth by the manipulative Emperor of Rome". An earlier book by Brown, Angels & Demons, depicts the Church as involved in an elemental battle with the Illuminati.

A World Lit Only by Fire by William Manchester quotes several anti-Catholic stereotypes about the Middle Ages, while pretending to be academic.

== Cinema ==
Miramax, a company run by producer and convicted sexual predator Harvey Weinstein, has been accused of spreading anti-Catholic propaganda.

According to Jesuit priest Father James Martin, the U.S. entertainment industry is of "two minds" about the Catholic Church. He argues that:

"On the one hand, film and television producers seem to find Catholicism irresistible. There are a number of reasons for this. First, more than any other Christian denomination, the Catholic Church is supremely visual, and therefore attractive to producers and directors concerned with the visual image. Vestments, monstrances, statues, crucifixes – to say nothing of the symbols of the sacraments – are all things that more 'word oriented' Christian denominations have foregone. The Catholic Church, therefore, lends itself perfectly to the visual media of film and television. You can be sure that any movie about the Second Coming or Satan or demonic possession or, for that matter, any sort of irruption of the transcendent into everyday life, will choose the Catholic Church as its venue.

Second, the Catholic Church is still seen as profoundly "other" in modern culture and is therefore an object of continuing fascination. As already noted, it is ancient in a culture that celebrates the new, professes truths in a postmodern culture that looks skeptically on any claim to truth, and speaks of mystery in a rational, post-Enlightenment world. It is therefore the perfect context for scriptwriters searching for the "conflict" required in any story."

He argues that, despite this fascination with the Catholic Church, the entertainment industry also holds contempt for the Church. "It is as if producers, directors, playwrights and filmmakers feel obliged to establish their intellectual bona fides by trumpeting their differences with the institution that holds them in such thrall."

== Television ==
Rede Record, a controversial Brazilian TV station owned by the Brazilian Protestant church Universal Church of the Kingdom of God (UCKG) (run by the controversial Brazilian Protestant televangelist pastor, writer, and billionaire businessman Edir Macedo), has been accused of spreading anti-Catholic propaganda.

Father James J. Martin suggests that "it is television that has proven the most fertile ground for anti-Catholic writing. Priests, when they appear on television shows, usually appear as paedophiles or idiots, and are rarely seen to be doing their jobs."

== Modern polemics ==
Themes of modern anti-Catholic controversialists included accusations of paganism, idolatry and conspiracy theories which accuse the church of seeking world domination. Some Protestant polemics also brand the Catholic Church as the Antichrist and the Whore of Babylon. One example of modern anti-Catholic polemic can be found in the writings of the American evangelical author John Dowling. In his The History of Romanism, he accused the Catholic Church of being "the bitterest foe of all true churches of Christ – that she possesses no claim to be called a Christian church – but, with the long line of corrupt and wicked men who have worn her triple crown, that she is ANTI-CHRIST".

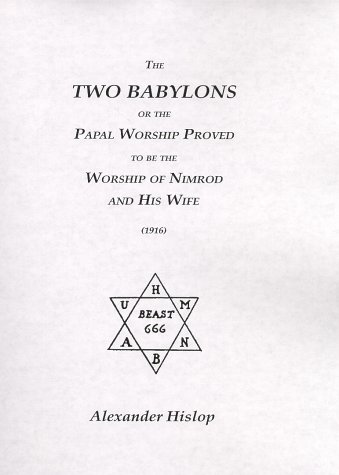
Cover of a 1919 edition of Hislop's anti-Catholic The Two Babylons

Alexander Hislop's pseudohistorical work The Two Babylons (1858) asserted that the Roman Catholic Church originated from a Babylonian mystery religion, claiming that its doctrines and ceremonies are a veiled continuation of Babylonian paganism.

The renegade priest Charles Chiniquy's 50 Years In The Church of Rome and The Priest, the Woman and the Confessional (1885) also depicted Catholicism as pagan.

Avro Manhattan's books,Vatican Moscow Alliance (1982), The Vatican Billions (1983), and The Vatican's Holocaust (1986) advance the view that the Church engineers wars for world domination.

Hislop's and Chiniquy's nineteenth century polemics and Avro Manhattan's work form part of the basis of a series of tracts by the noted modern anti-Catholic and comic book evangelist Jack Chick who also accuses the papacy of supporting Communism, of using the Jesuits to incite revolutions, and of masterminding the Holocaust. According to Chick, the Catholic Church is the "Whore of Babylon" referred to in the Book of Revelation, and will bring about a Satanic New World Order before it is destroyed by Jesus Christ. Chick claims that the Catholic Church infiltrates and attempts to destroy or corrupt all other religions and churches, and that it uses various means including seduction, framing, and murder to silence its critics. Drawing on the ideas of Alberto Rivera, Chick also claims that the Catholic Church helped mould Islam as a tool to lure people away from Christianity in what he calls the Vatican Islam Conspiracy.

In David Ranan's book Double Cross: The Code of the Catholic Church, his analysis of the Church's history, dogma and present day strategies leads to the conclusion that the Catholic Church is incapable of accepting her culpability and therefore unlikely to change.

Author David Yallop has followed up his best-selling book In God's Name (1984), which claimed that Pope John Paul I was killed by corrupt Vatican schemers (see Pope John Paul I conspiracy theories) with another The Power and the Glory: Inside the Dark Heart of John Paul II's Vatican (2007) which claims that Pope John Paul II was in league with Soviet power. Yallop enlarges on claims of priestly sexual abuse and repeats other standard anti-Catholic tropes listed above together with a new one that St Maximilian Kolbe, the Polish priest who died in place of a young married man at Auschwitz, had previously endorsed the anti-Jewish Protocols of the Elders of Zion. There is no reference for this claim and just thirteen footnotes in the entire 530 pages.

Daniel Goldhagen has been accused of attacking Pope Pius XII in a book filled with factual errors.

== Satire and humour ==
The Catholic Church has been a target for satire and humour, from the time of the Reformation to the present day. Such satire and humour ranges from mild burlesque to vicious attacks. Catholic clergy and lay organizations such as the Catholic League monitor for particularly offensive and derogatory incidences and voice their objections and protests.

== Gender and sexuality ==
Accusations of deviant sexuality have provided a rich field for anti-Catholic polemicists since the time of the Reformation.

Under Henry VIII, even before he broke with Rome, lurid tales of sexual deviancy by monks and nuns were part of the justification for the Dissolution of the Monasteries. According to a later commentator the alleged carnal misdeeds of the monks and nuns were recorded in a 'Black Book' wherein was recorded "the vile lives and abhominable factes in murders of their bretherene, in sodomyes and whordomes, in destroying children, in forging deedes and other horrors of life" (sic). R.W. Dixon in his History of the Church of England justified the Dissolution of the monasteries on the grounds that they were under "the condemnation of Sodom and Gomorrah", i.e., some monks and nuns were homosexual. Prior to the Dissolution its instigator Thomas Cromwell had decreed death by hanging for homosexuals through the Buggery Act 1533: the first time the death penalty had been applied for this offence in England.

In the twentieth century the Nazi government denounced the Catholic Church as "awash with sex fiends" (the Nazi Churches minister claimed that 7,000 clergy had been convicted of sex crimes between 1933 and 1937 while "the true figure seems to have been 170, of whom many had left the religious life prior to their offences.") These accusations were part of a campaign by some members of the Nazi party, including Joseph Goebbels, to reduce the influence of the Catholic Church in Nazi Germany during the second half of the 1930s.

Erotic literature has often been a vehicle for anti-Catholic sentiments. Victorian writer Henry Spencer Ashbee devotes 300 pages of the second volume of his three volume bibliography of erotic works to such anti-Catholic pornography. In particular, the erotic life of nuns has held great fascination from Denis Diderot's La Religieuse of 1798. Recent times have brought nunsploitation films, often seen as pure exploitation but at times containing criticism against religion in general and the Catholic church in particular. Indeed, some of the protagonists voice a feminist consciousness and a rejection of their subordinated social role. For instance at the end of The Nun and the Devil, based on the true events of the suppression of the Convent of Sant Archagelo at Naples in the 16th century, a condemned nun launches a bitter attack against the church hierarchy. Many of these films were made in countries where the Catholic church is dominant, such as Italy and Spain.

Lately sexual abuse by representatives of the Catholic church has been highlighted in such films as The Magdalene Sisters (2002). However the veracity of the bestselling Kathy's Story by Kathy O'Beirne which details physical and sexual abuse suffered in a Magdalene laundry in Ireland has been questioned in a new book entitled Kathy's Real Story by Hermann Kelly. In this book it is alleged that false allegations against the priesthood are being fueled by a government compensation scheme for victims.

Many feminists and lesbian, gay, bisexual, and transgender activists criticize the Catholic Church for its policies on issues relating to sexuality, contraception, and abortion. In 1989 members of the ACT UP and WHAM! disrupted a Sunday Mass at Saint Patrick's Cathedral in Manhattan to protest the Church's position on homosexuality, abortion, safer sex education, and the use of condoms. One hundred and eleven protesters were arrested outside the Cathedral, and at least one protester inside threw used condoms at a Church altar and desecrated the Eucharist during Mass.

== Media coverage of abuse cases ==
Philip Jenkins, an Episcopalian and Professor of History and Religious Studies at Penn State University, published the 1996 book Pedophiles and Priests: Anatomy of a Contemporary Crisis in which he argues that the Catholic Church is being unfairly singled out by secular media which fail to highlight similar sexual scandals in other religious groups, such as the Anglican Communion, various Protestant churches, and the Jewish and Islamic communities. He also states that the Catholic Church may have a lower incidence of molesting priests than Churches that allow married clergy because statistically child molestation generally occurs within families, but Latin Church Catholic priests do not have families, and the Catholic Church only generally allows married priests in some Eastern Catholic churches. He also notes that the term "pedophile priests," widely used in the media, implies a distinctly higher rate of child molesters within the Catholic priesthood when in reality the incidence is lower than in most other segments of society".

== See also ==
- Anti-Catholicism in the United States
- A True Narrative of the Horrid Hellish Popish Plot
