= Allah as a lunar deity =

Fringe historical claim related to the origins of Islam

The word 'Allah' in thuluth calligraphy

The theory that Allah (God in Islam) originated as a lunar deity began in 1901 with the archaeologist Hugo Winckler. He associated Allah with a pre-Islamic Arabian deity, either Lah or Hubal, whom he identified as lunar in nature. However, opponents have rejected this theory due to its speculative character and lack of archaeological or textual evidence from pre-Islamic Arabia. Hubal, a deity worshipped at the Kaaba before Islam, is often mentioned in these claims. Some suggest that Hubal originated from the Levant or Mesopotamia. Historian Philip K. Hitti posits that Hubal's name may derive from an Aramaic term for "spirit".

In the 1990s, the idea was popularized in the United States by Christian apologists, especially Robert Morey, who argued in his works that "Allah" was originally a moon deity, citing the Islamic lunar calendar and crescent imagery. However, opponents argue this view misinterprets the symbolism and lacks historical support.

Academics continue to reject the theory as unsubstantiated. The claim has also been criticized for being offensive to Muslims and Arab Christians, who also use the term "Allah" for God.

== Scholarly views ==
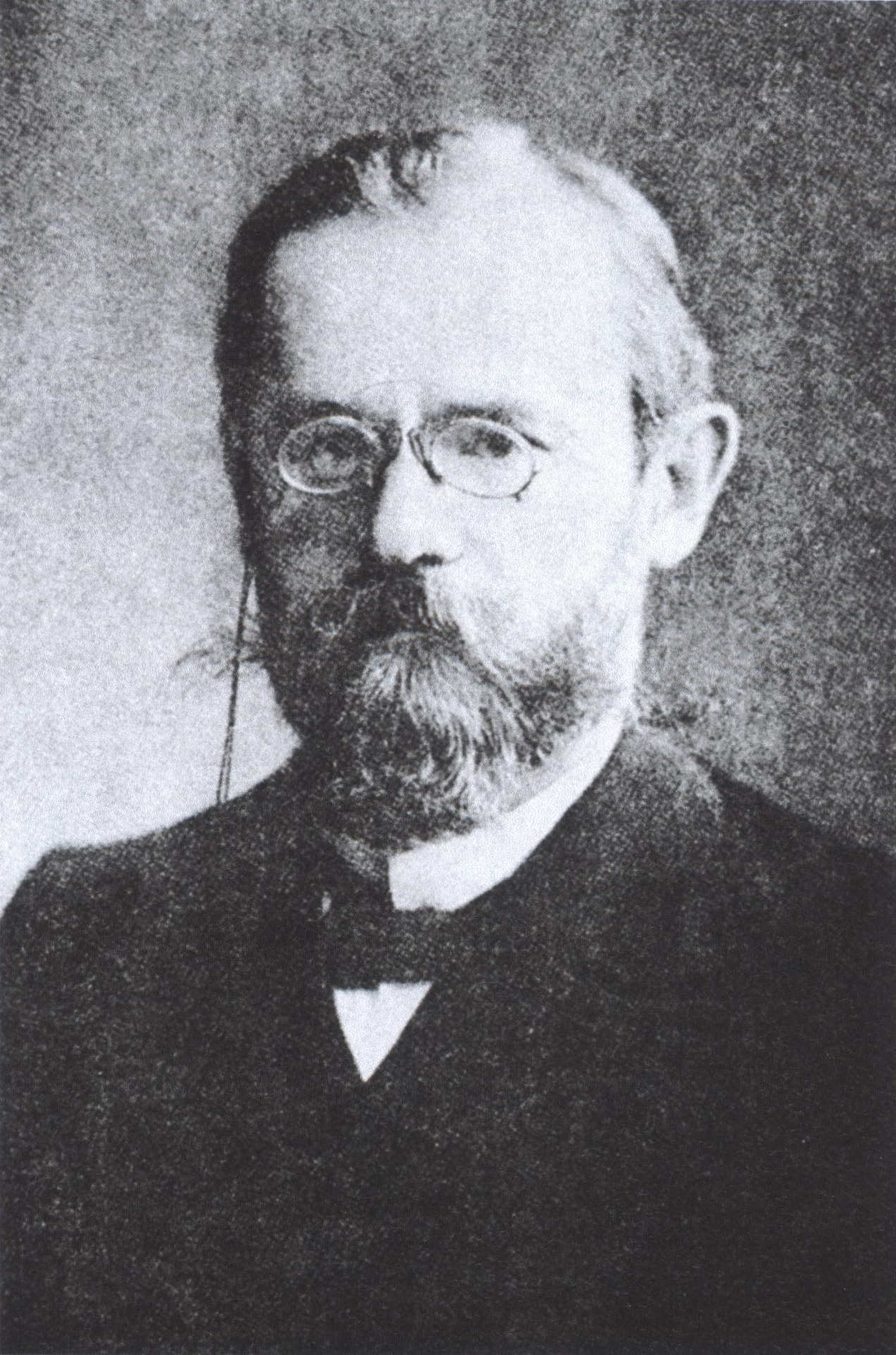
Hugo Winckler

The lunar hypothesis stems primarily from early 20th-century scholar Hugo Winckler's claim that Hubal was a moon god and his suggestion of a possible association with God in Islam.

This theory was relatively short-lived. By the middle of the 20th century, scholars had presented rebuttals to Winckler's claim over its largely speculative nature. Still more recent scholarship has meanwhile described Hubal differently, with David Adams Leeming citing him as a war and rain god, in accordance with an earlier view shared by Mircea Eliade.

Before Islam, the Kaaba contained a statue representing the god Hubal. It has also been proposed, however, that Hubal was a non-native deity imported into the Southern Arabian shrine, which was possibly already associated with Allah at the time.

Historian Patricia Crone notes that if Hubal and Allah had been the same deity, Hubal would have been expected to have survived in Islamic usage as one of Allah's names or epithets, which is not the case. Moreover, she notes the existence of traditions in which people are explicitly urged to renounce one of the two deities for the other, implying a distinction between the two.

Joseph E. B. Lumbard, a professor of classical Islam, has described the claim that Allah was a moon god as "not only an insult to Muslims but also an insult to Arab Christians who use the name 'Allah' for God."

== Christian proponents ==
Robert Morey's book The Moon-god Allah in the Archeology of the Middle East claims that Al-‘Uzzá is identical in origin to Hubal, whom he asserts to be a lunar deity. This teaching is repeated in the Chick tracts "Allah Had No Son" and "The Little Bride". In 1996 Janet Parshall, in syndicated radio broadcasts, asserted that Muslims worship a moon god. Pat Robertson said in 2003, "The struggle is whether Hubal, the Moon God of Mecca, known as Allah, is supreme, or whether the Judeo-Christian Jehovah God of the Bible is Supreme."

In addition to books and pamphlets, the "moon-god Allah" theory has been widely disseminated online through visual media such as memes. These often combine unrelated symbols, artifacts, and Islamic imagery to imply a connection between Islam and pre-Islamic moon worship, juxtaposing visual elements to promote these claims.

However, recent research from various sources has proven that the "evidence" used by Morey was of the statue retrieved from an excavation site at Hazor, of which there is no connection to "Allah" at all.

In 2009, anthropologist Gregory Starrett wrote, "a recent survey by the Council for American Islamic Relations reports that as many as 10% of Americans believe Muslims are pagans who worship a moon god or goddess, a belief energetically disseminated by some Christian activists". Ibrahim Hooper of the Council on American-Islamic Relations (CAIR) calls the Moon-God theories of Allah evangelical "fantasies" that are "perpetuated in their comic books".

Farzana Hassan sees these views as an extension of long-standing Christian claims that Muhammad was an impostor and deceiver, and has stated: "Literature circulated by the Christian Coalition perpetuates the popular Christian belief about Islam being a pagan religion, borrowing aspects of Judeo-Christian monotheism by elevating the moon god Hubal to the rank of Supreme God, or Allah. Muhammad, for fundamentalist Christians, remains an impostor who commissioned his companions to copy words of the Bible as they sat in dark inaccessible places, far removed from public gaze."

== Muslim views ==
In 8th-century Arab historian Hisham Ibn Al-Kalbi's Book of Idols, the idol Hubal is described as a human figure with a gold hand (replacing the original hand that had broken off the statue). He had seven arrows that were used for divination.

Whether or not Hubal was even associated with the moon, Muhammad and his enemies identified Hubal and Allah as different gods, their supporters fighting on opposing sides in the Battle of Uhud. Ibn Hisham notes that Abu Sufyan ibn Harb, leader of the anti-Islamic army, glorified Hubal after their perceived victory at Uhud:

When Abū Sufyān wanted to leave he went to the top of the mountain and shouted loudly saying, "You have done a fine work; victory in war goes by turns. Today in exchange for the day (Ṭ. of Badr). Show your superiority, Hubal," i.e. vindicate your religion. The apostle told 'Umar to get up and answer him and say, "God is most high and most glorious. We are not equal. Our dead are in paradise; your dead in hell."

The Quran itself forbids sun and moon worship in verse 37 of Surah Fussilat:

Do not prostrate to the sun or to the moon, but prostrate to Allah, who created them.

Islam teaches that Allah is the name of God (as iterated in the Quran), and is the same god worshipped by the members of other Abrahamic religions such as Christianity and Judaism (Quran 29:46).

== Pre-Islamic traditions ==
According to British historian G. R. Hawting, Allah was revered by several tribes in pre-Islamic Arabia, particularly the Quraysh in Mecca, and was regarded as the "God of gods". Despite this elevated status, Allah was worshipped within a polytheistic system that included inferior deities such as Hubal, Al-Lat, and Al-Uzza, who were seen as intercessors to Allah.

The Meccans also held that a kind of kinship existed between Allah and the jinn. They believed that Allah had sons and daughters, and possibly associated angels with Him. In times of distress, Allah was invoked directly.

The name of Muhammad's father was عبد الله ʿAbd-Allāh, which means 'the slave of Allāh', indicating the pre-Islamic use of the name "Allah" in theophoric names.

According to Patricia Crone, the rise of Islam marked a decisive shift to strict monotheism by redefining Allah as the one and only God. Recent epigraphic discoveries further confirm that Allah was invoked as a high god distinct from pagan deities and lunar cults.

== See also ==
- Ancient Semitic religion
- Islam
- Mahound
- Religion in pre-Islamic Arabia
- Tawhid
- Termagant
- The Two Babylons

== Bibliography ==
- Shaheen, Jack G. (1997). Arab and Muslim Stereotyping in American Popular Culture (PDF). Georgetown University Occasional Papers. Centre For Muslim-Christian Understanding: History and International Affairs, Georgetown University. Archived from the original (PDF) on March 24, 2012.
