= Dark Dungeons =

Dark Dungeons may refer to:

- A dungeon cell or torture chamber
- Dark Dungeons (film), based on the Chick tract of the same name
- Dark Dungeons (role-playing game), a fantasy role-playing game that emulates the classic-era Dungeons & Dragons
- One of the types in the spectrum of seven dark suppliers of Holocaust tourism
- Cells for patients with mental disorders, that as a result of increasing moral treatment were replaced with sunny, ventilated rooms
