= Fred Carter (artist) =

American artist (1938–2022)

Fred Carter (June 22, 1938 – May 9, 2022) was an American comic book artist known for the work he did on Jack Chick's tracts which promote Protestant fundamentalism.

== Early life and education ==
Carter was born in Danville, Illinois on June 22, 1938, to an African-American family. Little is known about his early life or family. As a student in high school, he was encouraged by an art teacher to submit his work for an art competition run by the American Academy of Art in Chicago. After he won second place in the competition, Carter studied at the American Academy of Art in Chicago on scholarship but had to drop out after a year due to economic circumstances. Carter converted to Christianity at age 18.

== Work ==
Carter first discovered Chick tracts in the early 1970s when his friend showed him a tract he picked up in Chicago. Carter, wanting to create art in a Christian setting, moved to California and started working for Jack Chick in 1972. He illustrated tracts for Chick such as The Deceived, Room 310, The First Jaws, and Allah had no Son. Carter also did illustrations for Chick's full-sized comic book series, The Crusaders.

Carter worked anonymously for Chick Publications from 1972 until 1980 when Chick acknowledged Carter's work in an issue of his newsletter Battle Cry. In 1985, Carter started creating a series of oil paintings depicting the story of Jonah for a comic; an undertaking which proved to be too expensive. However, Carter continued creating oil paintings depicting biblical scenes for Chick's 2001 film The Light of the World. In 2006, Carter redrew Chick's most popular comics to depict black people.
