= Hubal =

Pre-Islamic Arabian god

Hubal هبل (Arabic)
- God of divination, the rain, and war
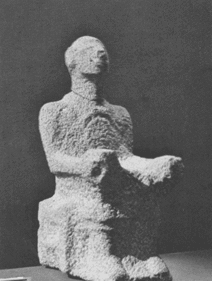
- Statue from Tel Hazor. This is sometimes associated with Hubal.
- Major cult center: Mecca
- Symbol: Gold-handed figure, arrows
- Region: Arabia
- Consort: Manāt

In Arabian mythology, Hubal (Arabic: هُبَل) was a god worshipped in pre-Islamic Arabia, notably by the Quraysh at the Kaaba in Mecca. The god's icon was a human figure believed to control acts of divination, which was performed by tossing arrows before the statue. The direction in which the arrows pointed answered questions asked to Hubal.

== Etymology ==
The name Hubal may be ultimately derivative of the name Baal from the Canaanite pantheon. In particular, the name could derive from the Aramaic hu bel, meaning "he is Baal". The relationship between Hubal and Baal is supported by some additional evidence, including that both were depicted with a missing or broken right hand.

== Hubal at the Kaaba ==
Hubal most prominently appeared at Mecca, where an image of him was worshipped at the Kaaba. According to Karen Armstrong, the sanctuary was dedicated to Hubal, who was worshipped as the greatest of the 360 idols the Kaaba contained, which probably represented the days of the year.

Hisham Ibn Al-Kalbi's Book of Idols describes the image as shaped like a human, with the right hand broken off and replaced with a golden hand. According to Ibn Al-Kalbi, the image was made of red agate, whereas Al-Azraqi, an early Islamic commentator, described it as of "cornelian pearl". Al-Azraqi also relates that it "had a vault for the sacrifice" and that the offering consisted of a hundred camels. Both authors speak of seven arrows, placed before the image, which were cast for divination, in cases of death, virginity, and marriage.

According to Ibn Al-Kalbi, the image was first set up by Khuzayma ibn Mudrika, but another tradition, recorded by Ibn Ishaq, holds that Amr ibn Luhayy, a leader of the Khuza'a tribe, put an image of Hubal into the Kaaba, where it was worshipped as one of the chief deities of the tribe. The date for Amr is disputed, with dates as late as the end of the fourth century AD suggested, but what is quite sure is that the Quraysh later became the protectors of the ancient holy place, supplanting the Khuza'a.

A tale recorded by Ibn Al-Kalbi has Muhammad's grandfather Abdul Mutallib vowing to sacrifice one of his ten children. He consulted the arrows of Hubal to find out which child he should choose. The arrows pointed to his son Abd-Allah, the future father of Muhammad. However, he was saved when 100 camels were sacrificed in his place. According to Tabari, Abdul Mutallib later also brought the infant Muhammad himself before the image.

After defeat by Muhammad's forces at the Battle of Badr, Abu Sufyan ibn Harb, leader of the Quraysh army, is said to have called on Hubal for support to gain victory in their next battle, saying "Show your superiority, Hubal". When Muhammad conquered Mecca in 630, he broke the statue of Hubal, along with the other 360 images at the Kaaba, and dedicated the structure to Allah.

== Origins of Hubal ==
There may be some foundation of truth in the story that Amr travelled in Syria and had brought back from there the cults of the goddesses ʻUzzāʼ and Manāt, and had combined it with that of Hubal, the idol of the Khuza'a. According to Al-Azraqi, the image was brought to Mecca "from the land of Hit in Mesopotamia" (Hīt in modern Iraq). Philip K. Hitti, who relates the name Hubal to an Aramaic word for spirit, suggests that the worship of Hubal was imported to Mecca from the north of Arabia, possibly from Moab or Mesopotamia. Hubal may have been the combination of Hu, meaning "spirit" or "god", and the Moabite god Baal meaning "master" or "lord" or as a rendition of Syriac habbǝlā/Hebrew heḇel "vanity". Outside South Arabia, Hubal's name appears just once, in a Nabataean inscription; there Hubal is mentioned along with the gods Dushara (ذو الشراة) and Manawatu—the latter, as Manat, was also popular in Mecca. On the basis of such slender evidence, it has been suggested that Hubal "may actually have been a Nabataean". There are also inscriptions in which the word Hubal appears to be part of personal names, translatable as "Son of Hubal" or "made by Hubal".

== Mythological role ==
The paucity of evidence concerning Hubal makes it difficult to characterise his role or identity in pagan Arabian mythologies. The 19th century scholar Julius Wellhausen suggested that Hubal was regarded as the son of al-Lāt and the brother of Wadd. Hugo Winckler in the early twentieth century speculated that Hubal was a lunar deity, a view that was repeated by other scholars. This was derived from Ditlef Nielsen's theory that South Arabian mythology was based on a trinity of Moon-father, Sun-mother and the evening star (the planet Venus) envisaged as their son. More recent scholars have rejected this view, partly because it is speculation but also because they believe a Nabataean origin would have made the context of South Arabian beliefs irrelevant.

Mircea Eliade and Charles J. Adams assert that he was "a god of rain and a warrior god. Towards the end of the pre-Islamic era he emerged as an intertribal warrior god worshipped by the Quraysh and the allied tribes of the Kinana and Tihama." The view that he was a warrior rain god is repeated by David Adams Leeming.

John F. Healey in The Religion of the Nabataeans (2001) accepts the Nabataean origins of the god, but says there is little evidence of Hubal's mythological role, but that it is possible that he was closely linked to Dushara in some way. The one surviving inscription concerns a religious injunction to placate Hubal and others for violating a tomb.

== Modern usage ==
=== Among Muslims ===
Muslims have invoked the figure of Hubal in the ideological struggles of the post-Cold War era. In Islam, Hubal has been used as a symbol of modern forms of "idol worship". According to Adnan A. Musallam, this can be traced to Sayyid Qutb, who used the label to attack secular rulers such as Nasser, seen as creating "idols" based on un-Islamic Western and Marxist ideologies. In 2001, Osama bin Laden called America the modern Hubal. He referred to allies of America as "hypocrites" who "all stood behind the head of global unbelief, the Hubal of the modern age, America and its supporters". Al Qaeda's then number two, Ayman al-Zawahiri, repeated the phrase (hubal al-'asr) in describing America during his November 2008 message following Barack Obama's election to the presidency. The analogy may have been passed on to Bin Laden by one of his teachers, Abdullah Azzam.

=== Among Christian evangelicals ===
Many Evangelical Christian critics of Islam have claimed that the worship of Allah as proclaimed by Muhammad was not a restoration of Abrahamic monotheism, but an adaptation of the worship of Hubal. Robert Morey's 1994 book Moon-god in the Archeology of the Middle East revives Hugo Winckler's identification of Hubal as a moon god, and claims that worship of Allah evolved from that of Hubal, thus making Allah a "moon god" too. This view is repeated in the Chick tracts "Allah Had No Son" and "The Little Bride", and has been widely circulated in evangelical and anti-Islamic literature in the United States. In 1996, Janet Parshall asserted that Muslims worship a moon god in syndicated radio broadcasts. In 2003 Pat Robertson stated, "The struggle is whether Hubal, the Moon God of Mecca, known as Allah, is supreme, or whether the Judeo-Christian Jehovah God of the Bible is supreme."

Farzana Hassan sees these claims as an extension of longstanding Christian evangelical beliefs that Islam is "pagan" and that Muhammad was an impostor and deceiver.

== See also ==
- List of pre-Islamic Arabian deities
- Allah as a lunar deity
- Al-Lat
- Al-'Uzzá
- Manāt
- Sin (mythology)
