= The Imp (zine) =

Comics zine

Cover of The Imp #4

The Imp is a zine about comics that was written and published by Daniel Raeburn during the late 1990s and early 2000s. Each issue of the zine examined a single cartoonist or type of comic in depth, often incorporating interviews done by Raeburn with or about the subject. Raeburn frequently took an idiosyncratic view of his subject matter in The Imp; in the introduction to the first issue he wrote that "the fact that I don't know anything about comics can only help me to take them seriously." He frequently described his personal experiences with his subject matter in irreverent terms and gave detailed accounts of the people and places he encountered while doing his research, in the manner of gonzo journalism. The Imp is also notable for the unique design of each issue.

The Imp #1 was published in 1997 and was devoted to the works of Daniel Clowes. The second issue appeared a year later and examined the religious comics of Jack T. Chick; it was designed in a format that mimicked Chick's own tracts and included a concordance of terms and concepts that appear in his work. The third issue, designed in imitation of a broadsheet newspaper, contained a series of essays and article about Chris Ware. It included a single-page insert of original comic strips about Ware drawn by other cartoonists. The fourth issue of The Imp, released after a long delay, examined extremely lurid Mexican historietas and their cultural and commercial context. It featured extensive full-color illustrations and an original painted cover commissioned from a Mexican comic artist. The expense of printing the issue, which raised its cover price to $20, resulted in a significant financial loss for its creator and brought publication of the series to an end. A fifth issue of The Imp devoted to the work of Ivan Brunetti was advertised in the back of issue #4 but was never released.

In 2010 Raeburn made all four issues of The Imp freely available on his website.

== Issues ==
- #1 – The Fallen World of Daniel Clowes (1997)
- #2 – The Imp? (1998)
- #3 – The Smartest Cartoonist on Earth. (1999)
- #4 – ¡Historietas Perversas! Mexico's Addictive Comics (2002)
