= The Photo-Drama of Creation =

1914 religious film by the Watchtower Society

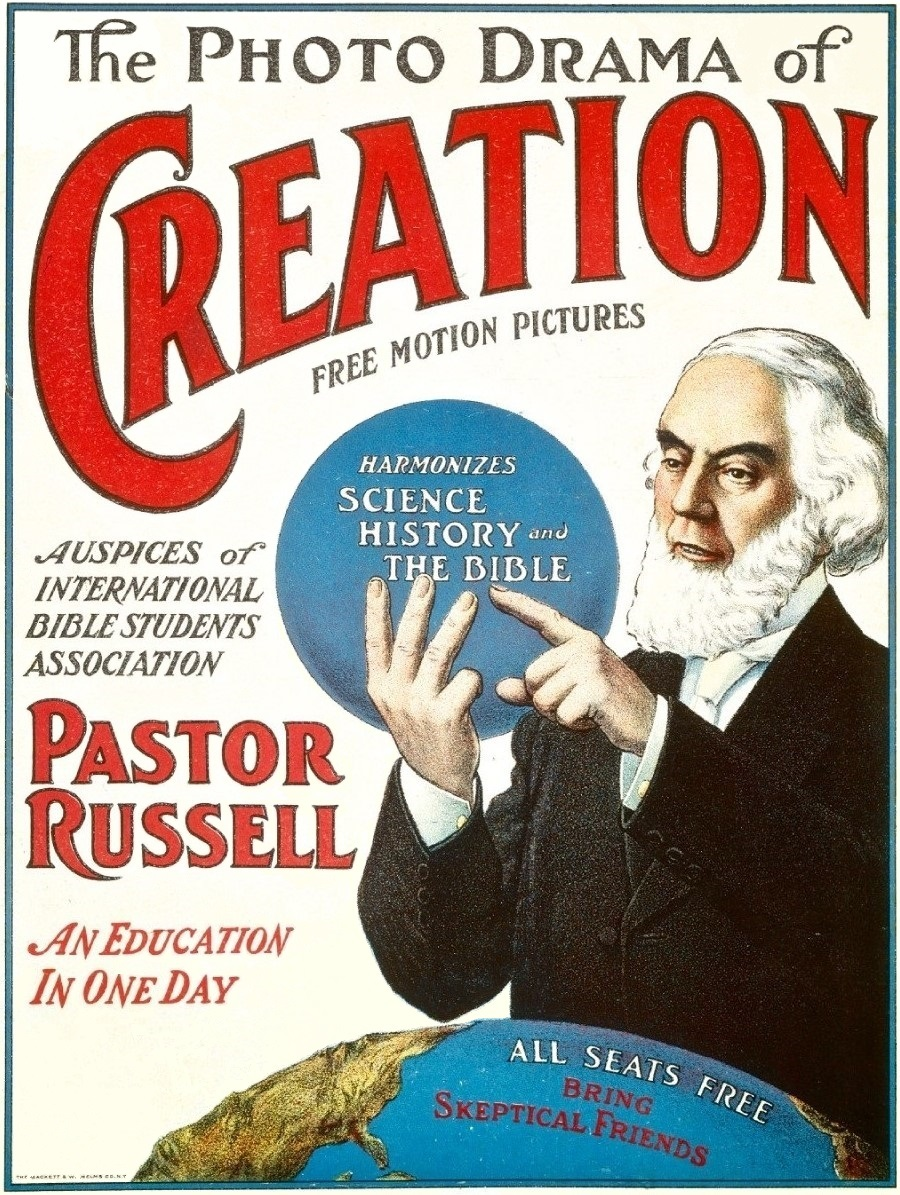
The Photo-drama of Creation used the recorded voice and moving pictures of Charles Taze Russell in 1912.

The Photo-Drama of Creation, or Creation-Drama, is a four-part audiovisual presentation (eight hours in total) produced by the Watch Tower Bible and Tract Society of Pennsylvania under the direction of Charles Taze Russell, the founder of the Bible Student movement. The presentation presents their beliefs about God's plan from the creation of the earth through to the end of the 1,000 year reign of Christ.

== History ==
Production began in 1912, and the presentation was introduced to audiences in 1914. It was the first major screenplay to incorporate synchronized sound, moving film, and color slides. Russell published an accompanying book, Scenario of the Photo-Drama of Creation, in various languages.

It is about eight hours in length and was presented in four parts. This presentation took the audience from the time of creation to the end of the Millennium. The presentation premiered in January 1914 in New York, and in the summer of 1914 in Germany. Over 9,000,000 people in North America, Europe, New Zealand and Australia saw either the full Photo-Drama or an abbreviated version called the Eureka-Drama. Shows that combined magic lantern slides and films were common at the time, but the addition of recorded speech was unusual, and the magnitude of its distribution for a single religious production was particularly notable. At the time, the project's full cost was estimated at $300,000 (current value $9,643,000).

The film was criticized by various members of the clergy for allowing showings on Sunday due to concerns that such showings dissuaded people from attending church services. A bylaw in Guelph was passed to make this illegal but this decision was reversed as provincial licensing did not have restrictions on what day it could be shown. The presentation was later censored entirely in Ontario because Russell and the Bible Students objected to military service in World War I, causing it to be the first film to be censored on a provincial level in Canada.

== Content ==
The Photo-Drama purported that the seven creative "days" in the Book of Genesis equal 49,000 years, based on Russell's belief that each creative day lasts 7,000 years. It claimed that 48,000 years have already passed, such that the final thousand years are "near at hand".

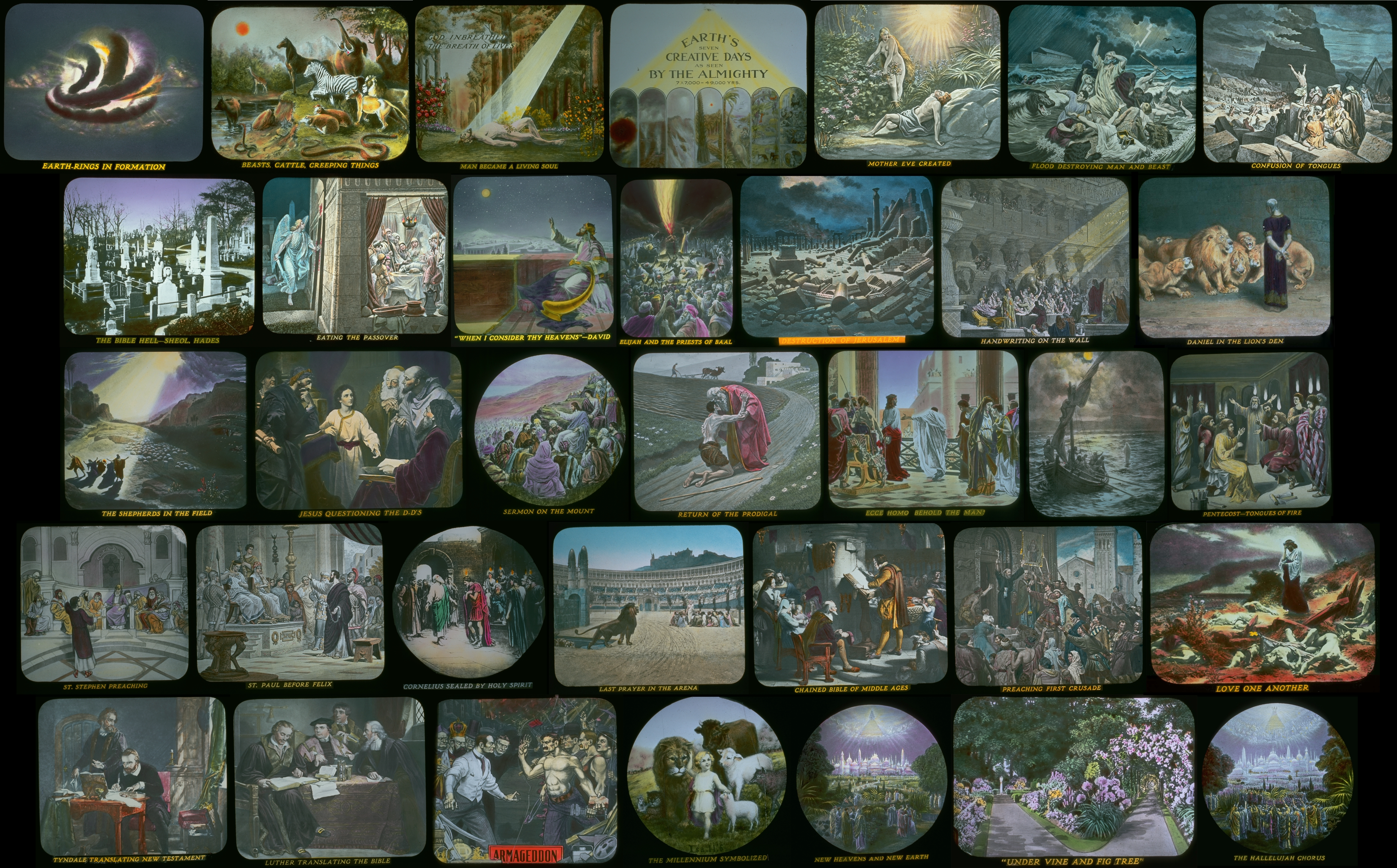
The slides from The Photo-Drama of Creation

== See also ==
- List of longest films by running time
- The Light of the World, 2003 film depicting events from the Bible in a series of oil paintings
