= Dark Dungeons (film) =

- DVD cover
- Directed by: L. Gabriel Gonda
- Screenplay by: JR Ralls
- Based on: Dark Dungeons Chick tract by Jack T. Chick
- Produced by: JR Ralls; Ben Rapson
- Starring: Alyssa Kay; Anastasia Higham; Tracy Hyland
- Cinematography: Sam Graydon
- Edited by: Ben Dobyns; L. Gabriel Gonda
- Music by: Randy Torres
- Production companies: Rallsfilm; Zombie Orpheus Entertainment
- Release date: August 14, 2014 (Gencon)
- Running time: 40 minutes
- Country: United States
- Language: English

Dark Dungeons is a 2014 American short film that was directed by L. Gabriel Gonda, written by JR Ralls, and based on the Chick tract of the same name. The film had its world premiere at GenCon on August 14, 2014 and was also released on VOD through the film's official website.

== Synopsis ==
The film opens with a group of sinister robed figures discussing how they are encouraging darkness to overtake the world through such factors as tarot cards, homosexuality, and role-playing games. One member states that all they need are a few more people to be converted in order for an entity known as the Dark One to take over the world. The film then cuts to Debbie and her childhood friend Marcie, who are discussing all of the fun they will have at their new school. They attend a freshman orientation class where they meet Mike, who encourages them to join an organization. On their way out they come across the RPG (role-playing game) club. Mike warns them against joining the group, as he sees them and RPGs in general as addictive and dangerous. The college has been trying to kick them off campus, but cannot due to their popularity.

The two girls decide to attend a wild party and proselytize, but are quickly overwhelmed and urged to drink and party. Halfway through their party, the music is cut off and the party's leader announces that the group will now take part in a RPG. They are dared to take part in the games by Mistress Frost. Debbie is reluctant to take part in the RPG at first, but Marcie takes part eagerly. During the game, Marcie assumes the identity of Black Leaf, a thief, while Debbie plays as Elfstar, a cleric. During gameplay, the two are forced to kill a game character that begs for their life, which disturbs Debbie, but only momentarily as they are too exhilarated by the game to think twice. Afterwards, Debbie comments that she felt real magic while casting spells in the game, which she liked. As the term progresses both girls end up sacrificing school for the RPG group and before long Debbie begins failing her classes. She is told that she must pass one of her next tests or she will fail the class, which would force her to move home. At the next gathering, Debbie reaches level eight and is approached by Mistress Frost, who inducts her into the art of witchcraft. With her new powers, she easily passes her classes by controlling her professor's mind. Eager to reach level eight herself, Marcie asks for a more extreme game in order to level up faster. Mistress Frost eagerly introduces them to LARPing, but warns them that if they break character they will be forever banished from the RPG group.

Before the game gets truly started, Mistress Frost is contacted by the robed figures, who tell her that one of the two girls must commit suicide in order to help the Dark One rise. During the game, Marcie's character ends up dying after she gets shot by a poison dart. This devastates Marcie, but Debbie is unable to offer any support without breaking character. As a result, Marcie returns to their dorm room alone, where she commits suicide. When Debbie informs Mistress Frost of Marcie's death, the woman is dismissive. This shocks Debbie, especially after she learns that Marcie was only used in order to summon Cthulhu via the Necronomicon during the LARP game – and that she herself was instrumental in summoning the deity. Debbie initially tries to venture into the college's steam tunnels to defeat him, only to find that this makes the entities stronger. Just as she is about to be trapped by the demons, she asks God to help her, which enables her to escape. Back in her dorm Debbie is approached by Mike, who invites her to come to a religious meeting as only Jesus can fight evil. At the meeting she repents and takes part in the destruction of RPG and occult materials (which includes books by C. S. Lewis and J. R. R. Tolkien), which foils the robed figures' plans to raise Cthulhu, and their fortress is destroyed by lightning.

== Cast ==
- Alyssa Kay as Debbie
- Anastasia Higham as Marcie
- Tracy Hyland as Mistress Frost
- Trevor Cushman as Mike
- Jonathan Crimeni as Nitro
- Kaleb Hagen-Kerr as Preacher
- David Anthony Lewis as Professor

== Production ==
Writer J. R. Ralls came up with the idea of filming an adaptation of Dark Dungeons while in college; however, the plans never came to fruition. After winning $1,000 in a 2013 lottery, Ralls once again considered making the film and contacted Jack T. Chick for permission to create an adaptation, which was granted. Additional funding for the film was raised through a successful Kickstarter campaign, which also managed to bring the proposed film to the attention of the production company Zombie Orpheus Entertainment.

== Reception ==
Critical reception for Dark Dungeons has been positive, with most critics interpreting the film as a satire of its source material. Wired remarked that Dark Dungeons was not filmed as an outright parody, which they felt strengthened the movie as the source material was "made by people who believe that Cthulhu is real and coming for your soul. You can't satirize something so far out of touch with reality." Comic Bastards made a similar statement in their favorable review for the film, stating that "Everyone plays it competently and straight and that's why it works so well."
