= The Light of the World (film) =

- Written by: Jack Chick
- Starring: David Jeremiah
- Music by: John Campbell
- Release date: October 13, 2003
- Running time: 78 minutes
- Language: English

The Light of the World is a 2003 slideshow film by Jack T. Chick depicting events from the Bible through 360 oil paintings by Fred Carter.

== Plot ==
The film begins with an explanation of the Holy Trinity: God the Father, God the Son, and God the Holy Spirit. Lucifer, a cunning, attractive angel, leads a rebellion in heaven that leads to the creation of Satan and his disciples, the Demons. They are cast out of Heaven and dwell around the Earth, which becomes the focal point for an amazing drama.

God creates the Earth in six days. He creates Adam and Eve and places them in a beautiful garden. Satan appears in the garden as a beautiful serpent and tempts Adam and Eve to eat the forbidden fruit. Adam and Eve are cast out of the garden. Evil spreads through the Earth through generations. Moses leads the Israelites out of Egypt.

In contemporary times, the viewer is shown what happens to an unsaved rich man who dies in his sin. He is taken to Hell naked, where he is thrown over a cliff by an Angel into a lake of fire. God has prepared a way for human beings to avoid this fate, that is the holy messiah. We are taken to the first century when the Roman Empire ruled much of the Earth. A virgin conceives and bears a son, who is named Jesus. The spiritual essence that is Jesus flies through the galaxy to the Earth, to Mary's womb. Jesus is born.

Jesus heals the sick and preaches the kingdom of God. In time, Satan summons all his forces to Jerusalem and delights in the trial, torture and crucifixion of Jesus, told in horrendous detail. Satan looks in delight at the unrecognisable face of Jesus as the sky turns completely black. Jesus is taken down from the cross and buried. Jesus rises on the third day and appears to his apostles and many of his apostles. He is Alpha and Omega and will live forever more. Satan realizes he has been a pawn in this spiritual battle and rages.

The film ends with religious groups that the Jack Chick organization regards as evil, such as Buddhism, Islam and the Catholic Church.

== Credits ==
- Narrator: David Jeremiah
- Music: John Campbell

== See also ==
- The Photo-Drama of Creation, 1914 audiovisual presentation
