= Shabir Ally =

Guyanese-Canadian Islamic scholar (born 1953)

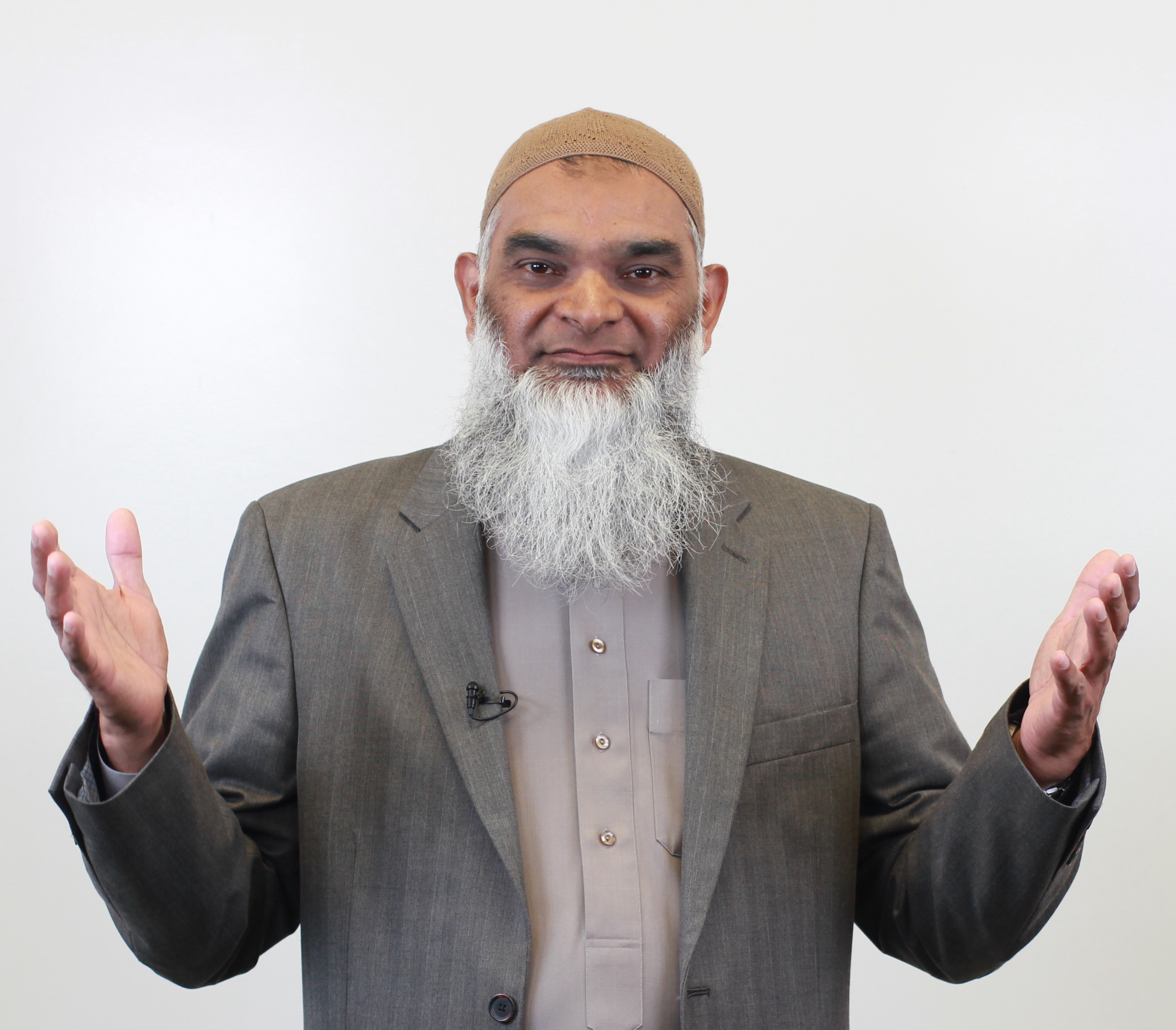
- Ally in 2013

Personal life
- Born: c. 1953 Guyana
- Main interest: Da'wah
- Education: Laurentian University (BA); University of Toronto (MA, PhD)
- Website: shabirally.com

Religious life
- Religion: Islam
- Denomination: Sunni
- Jurisprudence: Hanafi

YouTube information
- Channel: Let The Quran Speak
- Years active: 2008–present
- Genre: Islamic
- Subscribers: 417,000
- Views: 55.4 million
- Last updated: 4 August 2026

Shabir Ally (born 1953) is a Guyanese-Canadian Islamic scholar. As of 2020, he was President of the Islamic Information & Dawah Centre International in Toronto. He promotes a contextual interpretation of Qur'anic verse, and justification of them in similar expressions within the Christian Bible.

Ally performs dawah by adopting preaching methods targeted at both the Muslim population and the non-Muslim population.

== Early life and education ==
Shabir Ally was born in c. 1953 in Guyana, and moved to Canada with his family in 1978. He belongs to an Indo-Guyanese family with ancestral roots in Gujarat, India. He received his B.A. in religious studies from Laurentian University, with a specialization in Biblical literature, and his M.A. and Ph.D. from the University of Toronto. His PhD thesis, completed in 2013, was on the exegesis of the Qur'an (tafsir). He also holds a Bachelor of Science degree with a major in physics.

== Views ==
Despite his conservative upbringing, many views of Shabir Ally differ significantly from the traditional conservative mainstream Islamic scholars.

=== Hijab ===
Shabir Ally argues that covering the hair is not mandatory for women in Islam.

=== Stoning ===
Stoning adulterers is not a part of Islam according to Shabir Ally.

=== Hadith ===
Shabir Ally questions the process of Hadith classification done by many traditional scholars and doubts the true authenticity of many Hadiths which have been classified as authentic by other traditional scholars.

=== Ijma/Consensus ===
Shabir Ally calls into question the idea of a scholarly consensus (ijma) as a source of Islamic law. He says there is no consensus on the definition of a scholarly consensus, there is disagreement about whose agreement matters, the time period and location of the consensus, the scope of matters covered, and even the source of the authority of this consensus.

=== Celebrating Non Muslim Festivals ===
Celebrating Christmas and Halloween is not prohibited for Muslims according to Shabir Ally.

=== Theory of Evolution ===
Shabir Ally argues that the theory of evolution is not incompatible with Islam.

== Publications ==
- Reply to Robert Morey's source of Islam theories, Riyadh, Saudi Arabia : Dar Al-Hadyan, 1997.
- Is Jesus God? The Bible Says No!, Riyadh, Saudi Arabia : Dar Al-Hadyan, 1998.
- 101 questions to ask visiting Jehovah's Witnesses, Toronto, Canada : Islamic Information & Daʼwah Centre International, 1997. A second volume is entitled Another five questions to keep you going.
- Yahweh, Jehovah or Allah : which is God's real name?, Toronto, Canada : Al-Attique, 1999.
- 101 clear contradictions in the Bible, Toronto, Canada : Al-Attique, 2001.
- What God said about eating pork : & issue for Muslims / Christian dialogue, Toronto, Canada : Al-Attique, 2003.
- Science in the Qur'an, Toronto, Canada : Al-Attique, 2003.
- Common questions people ask about Islam, Toronto, Canada : Islamic Information & Da`wah Centre International, 2008.
- Christianity Vs. Islam : A Muslim and a Christian Debate 8 Crucial Questions, Minnesota, United States : Bethany House Publishers, 2014. Co-authored with James R. White.
