= Chick tract =

Series of gospel tracts

Chick Tracts
- This Was Your Life! cover, Chick tract translated into over a hundred languages, described by Chick Publications as its most popular title
- Parent company: Chick Publications
- Founded: January 1, 1960; 66 years ago
- Founder: Jack Chick
- Country of origin: United States
- Headquarters location: Ontario, California
- Nonfiction topics: Gospel tracts
- Official website: chick.com

Chick tracts are short gospel tracts in a comic book format, originally created by American cartoonist Jack Chick in the 1960s. His company Chick Publications has continued to print Chick's work, as well as tracts in a similar style by other writers. Several tracts have expressed controversial viewpoints including strong anti-Catholic views and criticisms of other faiths.

== Chick Publications ==
Chick Publications produces and markets the Chick tracts, along with other comic books, books, and posters. Chick Publications has its headquarters in Rancho Cucamonga, California. Chick Publications has produced over 250 different titles, about 100 of which are still in print and available in over 100 languages.

In addition to tracts, Chick also published twenty-three full-length comic books between 1974 and 2016.

== Format and design ==
The tracts themselves are approximately 3 by 5 inches (8 by 13 cm), and approximately twenty pages in length. The material is written in comic book format, with the front panel featuring the title of the tract and the inside back panel devoted to a standard sinner's prayer. The back cover of the tract contains a blank space for churches distributing the tracts to stamp their name and address. Chick Publications also prints custom back covers for a fee.

In Strips, Toons, and Bluesies: Essays in Comics and Culture, Douglas Bevan Dowd and Todd Hignite compare the format of Chick tracts to that of Tijuana bibles, and surmise that Chick was familiar with that medium and wrote with a similar audience of lower-class youth in mind. Writing for Print magazine, art and design critic Steven Heller refers to the tracts' graphic design as "disturbing and compelling, precisely because they were so undesigned."

== Themes ==
Chick tracts depict an America that is in religious, cultural, and political decline.

Chick tracts end with a four-step guide to salvation, with some featuring a retelling of Christ's atonement and others providing yes-or-no checkboxes with the question "Did you accept Jesus Christ as your own personal Saviour [sic]?" In the tracts dealing with "false religions", the prayer includes a clause to reject these religions. Included with the prayer are directions for converting to Christianity, which is also repeated on the inside back panel along with steps to take should the reader convert to Christianity.

Media, such as television, film, and rock music (including Christian rock) are depicted as part of a satanic conspiracy to promote acceptance of homosexuality and evolution, among other issues.

Chick published several anti-evolution tracts, but Big Daddy? remains "the most widely distributed anti-evolution booklet in history". In it, Chick attempts to discredit evolution. Critics have pointed out that Big Daddy? mainly uses Young Earth creationist Kent Hovind as a reference for its claims, despite his lack of scientific credentials. Other criticisms are that Chick not only distorts the fossil record, but in some cases, makes up facts.

The Chick tract Allah Had No Son perpetuates the theory that Allah is a pagan moon god. This polemic is an apparent spin on the work of Robert Morey from his book The Islamic Invasion: Confronting the World's Fastest-Growing Religion.

=== Anti-Catholicism ===
Chick tracts have been referred to as "arguably one of the most successful contemporary attempts to construct Roman Catholicism as a social problem". No fewer than 20 of the tracts are devoted to Catholicism, including Are Roman Catholics Christians?, The Death Cookie (a polemic against the Catholic Eucharist), and Why Is Mary Crying? (arguing that Mary does not support the veneration Catholicism gives her).

Several Chick tracts, along with six full-length comics, have featured the ideas of anti-Catholic conspiracy theorist Alberto Rivera, such as claims that the Catholic Church created Islam, Communism, and Nazism. In The New Anti-Catholicism, religious historian Philip Jenkins describes Chick tracts as promulgating "bizarre allegations of Catholic conspiracy and sexual hypocrisy" to perpetuate "anti-papal and anti-Catholic mythologies". Michael Ian Borer, a sociology professor at Furman University, described Chick's strong anti-Catholic themes in a 2007 American Sociological Association presentation and in a peer-reviewed article the next year in Religion and American Culture.

Chick's eschatological beliefs include "the Catholic Church [creating] a one-world government and [ruling] the world via the last pope, who is possessed by Satan."

Chick tracts also portray Islam as a false religion created by the Roman Catholic church, which is under the influence of Satan.

In Chick's view, "right theology and a knowledge of evil's true nature are the proper defense against the satanic onslaught of a godless (Catholic) media."

=== Anti-homosexuality ===
Chick tracts are unequivocal and explicit in their opposition to homosexuality, and repeatedly employ two anti-homosexual themes: the belief that God hates homosexuality and considers it to be sinful, and the idea that the true nature of homosexuality is revealed in the Christian interpretation of the story of Sodom and Gomorrah in the Book of Genesis. These themes run through tracts such as The Gay Blade, Wounded Children, Uninvited, Doom Town, Sin City, and Birds and the Bees.

According to Cynthia Burack, the tract The Gay Blade borrowed several of its frames from a 1971 Life photo essay on the gay liberation movement, but with the images altered to make the gay men look more dissolute or stereotypically feminized.

In several tracts, Chick's portrayal of homosexuality is wrapped into his dispensational premillennialism and his anti-Catholicism. This theme is presented in tracts such as The Last Generation, The Only Hope, The Last Missionary, The Beast, The Great Escape, Here He Comes, and Who's Missing? where sexual sin and Catholicism are part of the end-times vision of premillennialism.

== Criticisms ==
The Southern Poverty Law Center has designated Chick Publications as a hate group due to the anti-Catholic, anti-Muslim, and homophobic rhetoric found in Chick tracts.

The Hindu American Foundation has stated that "Chick Publications promotes hatred not just against Hindus, but also towards Muslims, Catholics, and others".

American Catholic apologetic group Catholic Answers has published a critique of Chick's anti-Catholicism entitled The Nightmare World of Jack T. Chick. Catholic Answers stated that "Chick portrays a world full of paranoia and conspiracy where nothing is what it seems and nearly everything is a Satanic plot to lead people to hell."

An article in Pop Culture and Theology contends that the tracts are "almost a direct descendant of the conspiratorial John Birch Society's worldview, where evil communists lurk around every corner to deceive and brutalize pristine, Eisenhowerian Americans. These comics are likewise, by every definition, little conspiracy theories."

Chick's claims about homosexuality have angered gay activists. In 1974, members of the Gay People's Liberation Alliance and the Women's Coalition protested the distribution of Chick tracts at Iowa State University, claiming that they provided an inaccurate representation of gay and bisexual people.

In December 2008, a Singaporean couple was charged with sedition for distributing the Chick tracts The Little Bride and Who Is Allah?. The tracts were said to "promote feelings of ill-will and hostility between Christians and Muslims in Singapore". The Chick Publications website has consequently been blocked in Singapore.

Churches have been criticized for distributing Chick tracts. For example, in October 2011, the Northview Baptist Church in Hillsboro, Ohio, gave out copies of the Chick tract Mean Momma along with candy at Halloween. The church received complaints from parishioners, and its pastor apologized for issuing the tracts, saying that the church does not endorse extreme methodology. In 2014, the Chick tract Unforgiven was distributed by Bible Baptist Church in Garden City, Roanoke, Virginia, drawing outrage from the area's Muslim community.

A controversial tract called Lisa dealt with the issues of child abuse, statutory rape, and paedophilia in a way seen as trivializing those real concerns. The tract has since been pulled from distribution.

== Parodies and popular culture ==
=== In film ===
- Dark Dungeons, a film adaptation of a Chick tract of the same name depicting Dungeons & Dragons as a front for Satanism, was released in August 2014. Producer JR Ralls was given the rights to the tract for free after contacting Chick.

=== In print ===
Some cartoonists have published parodies that mimic Chick tracts' layout and narrative conventions. Examples include:

- Devil Doll? by Daniel Clowes, Antlers of the Damned by Adam Thrasher, Jesus Delivers! by Jim Woodring and David Lasky, and Demonic Deviltry by "Dr. Robert Ramos" (actually Justin Achilli of White Wolf Game Studios).
- Issue #2 of Daniel K. Raeburn's zine The Imp, which consists of a lengthy essay on Jack T. Chick's work and a concordance of terms and concepts used in his comics, has dimensions and covers that imitate a Chick tract.
- Two parodies by "Jack C. Trick, LLC" and published by Trick Publications, entitled Chemical Salvation? (2006) and ADAM & EVIL?! (2007), tell the histories of LSD and MDMA respectively.
- A parody drawn by cartoonist Hal Robins, The Collector was included in chapter 13 of The Art of Jack T. Chick by Kurt Kuersteiner (2004, Schiffer Publishing, Ltd.).
- The first edition of the Rick and Morty Season 1 Blu-ray came with a print version of The Good Morty, a parody of Chick's work which appears in the episode "Close Rick-counters of the Rick Kind". The comic was written by series co-creator Justin Roiland and Ryan Ridley, and illustrated by Erica Hayes.

== See also ==
- Anti-Catholicism in literature and media
