= Six Months in a Convent =

1835 book by Rebecca Theresa Reed

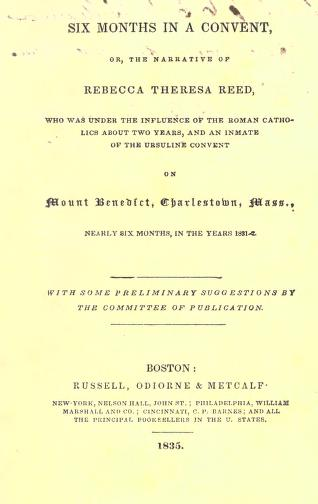
- Author: Rebecca Reed
- Genre: Memoir
- Publication date: 1835

Six Months in a Convent is a memoir written by Rebecca Reed and published in 1835. It is an account of her stay at the Ursuline Convent in Charlestown, Massachusetts, in 1832. The account was primarily written before, and published after, the 1834 Ursuline Convent riots, in which the facility was destroyed by rioting Protestants, and may have played a role in inspiring those riots. Reed was a witness at trials involving accused participants in the rioting.

== Summary ==
Rebecca Reed was a young Episcopalian woman from Boston who had attended the school operated by the Ursulines in 1831 as a charity scholar: a day student for whom the convent waived tuition fees. In 1832, she declared her intent to enter the Ursuline novitiate, but left the convent after six months as a postulant (originally one who makes a request or demand, hence a candidate).

In the memoir, Reed described the convent as a prison, where young girls were forced into Roman Catholicism, with grotesque punishment for those who refused. This book, along with a growing number of propaganda magazines including the Christian Watchman and Boston Recorder, stoked the fires of anti-Catholicism in Boston and the surrounding area.

== Circulation prior to publication and riots ==
Although not published until 1835, some versions of the manuscript apparently circulated among the primarily Protestant student community, and versions of it may have gained wider circulation in Charlestown. Some authors, including a former student at the school, have speculated that discussion of the manuscript may have contributed to the anti-Catholic sentiment which incited riots. Reed's claims were alleged by the Ursulines to inspire riots that burned the convent.

Reed's narrative, released one year after the rioters were tried, sold 200,000 copies in one month. A response to its allegations was published by Mother Superior Mary St. George.

== Maria Monk ==
Reed's book was soon followed by another bestselling supposed exposé, Awful Disclosures of the Hotel-Dieu Nunnery, (1836) in which Maria Monk claimed that a convent in Montreal served as a harem for Catholic priests, and that any resulting children were murdered after baptism. The tale of Maria Monk was, in fact, clearly modeled on the Gothic novels popular in the early 19th century. This literary genre had already been used for anti-Catholic sentiments in works such as Matthew Lewis's The Monk.
