= Rebecca Theresa Reed =

Author of Six Months in a Convent

Rebecca Theresa Reed (1813-1838) was an American escaped nun and author of the memoir Six Months in a Convent, which influenced the first of many anti-Catholic waves. Reed’s book vividly describes her experience in an Ursuline convent and has sold thousands of copies. Her writing inspired people like Maria Monk to speak out about their mistreatment in the Roman Catholic Church.

== Early life ==
Reed grew up on a small farm in Charlestown, Massachusetts with three sisters. Her Puritan family struggled with money so when Rebecca’s mother got sick, her father, William Reed, could no longer pay for her and her sisters’ education. Reed first turned to the Ursuline Convent in 1831 when her mother died from cancer and her sisters married or went to live with other relatives. At first, her family did not support the convent. They saw her sudden interest to join as part of the "Catholic manipulation" and a threat to separating their household. William threatened to throw her out of their home when she looked to convert her faith.

The Ursuline Convent had a glorious reputation at the time, offering elaborate courses. An advertisement for the school stated, “Particular attention… is given to orthography, plain and fancy needlework, plain and fancy ornamental inserting arithmetic, geography, French and English history, composition, rhetoric.” In the beginning, mainly poor Catholic girls and postulants attended, but later established a student population of wealthy and middle-class girls. Families placed their daughters in the convent to receive valuable, ornamental education.

== Six Months in a Convent ==
Reed wrote Six Months in a Convent, which details her experience as a sister in the Ursuline Convent. The memoir was published after she escaped in 1832. She describes having to meet with the Mother Superior and the Bishop on multiple occasions before she became a sister herself. Reed relates that, when she first entered the convent, the Bishop re-baptized Reed into the Catholic Church, and gave her the name Sister Mary Agnes Theresa. While in the convent, Reed befriended another nun named Sister Mary Francis with whom she took her music lessons. Mary Francis began to have struggles with the church and the convent, and confiding them to Reed created many issues.

Reed writes in her book that the Mother Superior and the Bishop became aware of the friendship between Reed and Mary Francis and began watching them both. Not long after, Mary Francis was sent away to a different convent, seemingly to help her conform back to the Catholic Church. The actions and beliefs toward Mary Francis alerted Reed that Mother Superior and the Bishop may not resemble what they seemed, and she began to grow her own suspicions. Reed recounted that she started missing her “worldly” friends and her sisters. She requested permission to write to them, which Mother Superior granted, yet she would later learn that none of the letters were delivered. Mother Superior often met Reed with much resistance whenever she discussed the outside world. Specifically, Mother Superior said, “Why, my dear Agnes, do you wish to see worldly friends? Who do you call your friends? Am I not your friend? Is not the Bishop your friend? If Your Worldly friends wished to see you, would they not.” In one of these conversations, Reed details the intensity of Mother Superior’s words and actions, in which they made her “sob aloud, and blood gushed from [her] nose and mouth.”

As Reed began to resist the beliefs and actions of the convent, she started to think of escaping. Under the watchful eye of the porters and their dogs, it was impossible for Reed to leave. The Bishop met Reed with much opposition as well, denying her possession of a Bible because she did not have the ability to interpret it. He also expressed to her that if she were to try and leave, the “worldly” people would still hate her for her decision to pursue Catholicism. One day, Reed overheard the Bishop and Mother Superior speaking. They mentioned her name and explained an elaborate plan to ship her off to a convent in Canada, like what they did to Mary Francis. Because Reed overheard their plan to trick her, she ultimately avoided the fate of Mary Francis. Reed escaped the convent not long after this and fled to a family friend’s home. Even though she no longer lived within the confines of the convent, the church still came looking for her, wanting her to rethink her decision. They told her that because she left the convent, “[she] will shed tears of blood in consequence of the step you have taken.”

== A response to Six Months in a Convent ==
Mother Superior, Mary Anne Ursula Moffatt, wrote a response to Reed’s Six Months in a Convent to preserve the reputation of the church and the convent, as well as deny Reed’s claims. Initially, she had left an anonymous card at various newspapers that threatened to expose the "actual truths" about Reed's experience and the convent. At this time, some people believed Moffatt’s hot-tempered personality could cause more harm to the Ursuline community. Regardless of backlash from the community, she wrote a complete response to Reed's book. Moffatt claimed her book depicted the Ursuline Convent as corrupt and wicked, bruising the church’s reputation. She argued that without these false allegations, the burning never would have happened. Claiming the memoir as false and exaggerated, Moffatt wrote this answer in an attempt to refute Reed’s memoir. She noted that much blame fell on Reed for the burning of the convent, but not for its destruction because the convent eventually reopened. During the trial, various women who were members of the convent provided letters of their time in the convent. They discredited Reed’s suggestions that the convent placed a “restraint upon personal liberty, ill treatment of the sick, kissing bishops' footsteps, kneeling or walking on knees.” However, Reed's verbiage using the word escape signifies that she became “self-liberated from restraint or danger.” Moffatt argued that Reed voluntarily kissed the floor and she had never forced a woman to perform such an act.

A local newspaper wrote that despite the convent taking Reed in as charity, Reed repaid her “benefactors by spreading lurid insinuations.” The community called the publisher of the newspaper “penny wise,” meaning the publisher risked their career when publishing Reed’s book, and many credited it as false.

When Reed overheard a conversation between Moffatt and the Bishop about sending her to Canada, she escaped the convent. Moffatt argued that if she had completed her jobs and had not sneaked off, she never would have heard the conversation. The Church refuted that they did not withhold authentic versions of scriptures, yet Reed discussed having to throw out any books and belongings she arrived with. She secretly received books from the Bishop under the name Mary Agnes Theresa. Regardless, religious books provided “false scriptures and justifications for woman's suffering” and explained the absence of readily accessible books to the women. Throughout her work, Moffatt calls Reed weak-minded, fanatical, lunatic, an imposter, among others.

== Aftermath ==
Many people blamed Reed for the Ursuline Convent Riots, which ultimately resulted in her publishing her writings, in order to clear her name. The Ursuline Superior condemned the rioters as “the dirt vagabonds of the city,” and believed they could never amount to anything but causing chaos. Priests and bishops assaulted the nuns they supervised. The men involved in the burning of the convent used this as motivation, claiming a violation of gender norms. Surprisingly, the wealthy citizens only reacted in fear of the mob targeting the rich. While the mob did not show hostility toward the rich, the wealthy unanimously decided on anti-rich motivations and ignored any ideological aspects of the mob's feelings. Reed wanted to expose the inner workings of the church and set the record straight on the series of events that led to this destruction. A legal investigation was launched to explore and find those responsible for the burning of the Convent. Though Reed’s involvement had never come to the public’s attention, she was largely blamed. Throughout the investigation, they never called Reed as a witness and they prohibited her from testifying or speaking to her innocence.

Many members of the Catholic church took to writing their own commentary on Reed and the contents of her writing. Many writers rejected her book and her experiences within the convent. One source went as far as to say that because of an impressionable state and mental health issues, Reed dramatized the whole account. Another Catholic news outlet expressed their support for the right to freedom of speech, but that this right resembled an anti-Catholic manner. Some Catholic news outlets hoped for silence and banishment of Reed‘s writings and urged all people of Catholic belief to reject her book, as she was not a true Catholic.

== Anti-Catholicism ==
The first wave of Anti-Catholicism, which inspired the burning of the Ursuline Convent in Charlestown, Massachusetts, came to be called “Nativism.” This campaign against the church had slowly grown for years, fueled by accusations from Protestant leaders that priests used nuns to “evade their vows of celibacy,” and that “monasteries were dens of vice and iniquity.” A great deal of propaganda against the Catholic church circulated, reaching the more easily influenced lower class. Eventually, the propaganda led a mob to burn down the Ursuline Convent. At this time, writing presses devoted to Anti-Catholic writing gained popularity. Suspicions also arose in the United States about the Roman Catholic religion. Many blame the existence of these presses for giving Reed a platform to write about her troubles in the convent. Some of the failures of the Ursulines can be credited to the tension of the genders in antebellum society between nuns and their Bishop. Women who entered the convent were also expected to give up their self-identity and conform for the greater good of the religious community. Reed brought up concerns to her superiors about situations that bothered her, and in return, they punished her for holding onto “worldly ideas.” The wave of anti-Catholicism that Reed contributed to, paved the way for other movements, including the anti-slavery movement, and gave rise to a writing called Uncle Tom’s Cabin of Nativism.

== Death ==
Reed died of tuberculosis on February 28, 1838, at the age of 25. The obituary made it seem as though she had confessed to all the assumptions people had made about her escaping the convent and the Ursuline Convent riots. After Reed’s death, her book grew in popularity in the anti-Catholic world and only increased the attention to the presence of the Roman Catholic religion in the United States. Reed asserting her confidence about her experiences and her book allowed Maria Monk express her feelings about her experience in the convent.
