= Alberto Rivera (activist) =

Spanish-American anti-Catholic activist (1935–1997)

- Jack T. Chick's rendition of Rivera
- Born: September 19, 1935; Las Palmas, Gran Canaria, Canary Islands, Spain
- Died: June 20, 1997 (aged 61); Broken Arrow, Oklahoma, US
- Resting place: Rose Hill Cemetery in Tulsa, Oklahoma
- Known for: Anti-Catholic religious activism

Alberto Magno Rivera Romero (September 19, 1935 – June 20, 1997) was a Spanish-American anti-Catholic religious activist and conspiracy theorist, who was the source of many of the theories about the Vatican espoused by fundamentalist Christian author Jack Chick.

Chick promised to promote Rivera's testimony even after he died. Rivera claimed to have been a Jesuit before becoming a Fundamentalist Protestant, and many of the stories Chick published about Rivera involve Jesuit activities. Most of Rivera's claims about his past, including his association with the Jesuits and his educational credentials, were disputed in an exposé by the evangelical Christian magazine Cornerstone.

== Biography ==
Rivera was born in Las Palmas de Gran Canaria, Canary Islands, Spain. He made numerous claims about his time as a Catholic priest and the inner workings of the Catholic Church. Most of these statements are disputed by the Catholic Church and others and Rivera was not able to provide compelling evidence in support his claims. An exposé by Gary Metz in Cornerstone magazine as well as another one in Christianity Today questioned many of Rivera's statements about his life, alleging that he was a fraud. The two conflicting versions are summarized below.

=== Rivera's account ===
According to Rivera, he was brought into a seminary in 1942 when he was 7. Two years later, as his mother was dying, she saw "ugly creatures" coming at her deathbed, and faced a "Christless eternity" because of her Catholic faith. When visiting his mother's grave, Rivera vowed to find answers to the truth. After education at an unnamed Catholic seminary, he was sent to destroy various Protestant organizations and discredit Protestant leaders, but Rivera says that he became disillusioned upon finding that the Vatican was behind Freemasonry and that its reverence of the Virgin Mary was contradicted by the Bible. In 1965, at an Ecumenical Conference in a Guatemalan stadium, he denounced the Catholic Church to an audience of 50,000 people. Rivera says that the Jesuits then sent him to a top-secret psychiatric hospital in Spain to make him embrace the Catholic faith—what Rivera referred to as "recanting his faith." Here he says that he was tortured and given poison until he nearly died, eventually being put into an iron lung because his lungs had broken down from the abuse. According to Rivera, he was "nearly at death" when he asked Jesus to forgive him and was miraculously healed. Rivera said that a senior Jesuit attempted to persuade Rivera to return to Catholicism, but instead was himself persuaded to give Rivera the passport and papers he needed to escape Spain. Afterwards, he flew to London and saved his sister María, a nun, after she nearly died in a convent of an unspecified illness or injury.

=== Cornerstone's account ===
According to the Cornerstone exposé, Rivera had a 'history of legal entanglements' including fraud, credit card theft, and writing bad checks. Warrants had been issued for his arrest in New Jersey and Florida, and he was wanted by the Spanish police for 'swindles and cheats'. While in the U.S. in 1967, he said he was collecting money for a Spanish college, which never received this money. The details of his religious statements changed over time. For example, in 1964 he said that he had left the Catholic Church in July 1952. Rivera later put the date at March 20, 1967 – an almost 15-year discrepancy. Despite this second statement of conversion from Catholicism in March 1967, Rivera was still promoting Catholicism in a newspaper interview of August that same year. Although supposedly placed involuntarily in the sanatorium where he said he was nearly murdered in 1965 and held there for three months, he gave the date of his release as September 1967. This leaves a period of more than a year unaccounted for in Rivera's narrative.

The document exhibited by Rivera to prove his status as a Catholic priest was fraudulent. The Catholic Church says his statement of having been a Jesuit priest, or another statement that he was a bishop, are not true. Rivera had only one sister who worked as a maid in a private London home, not as a nun in a convent; the statement that his sister the nun nearly died in a convent in London was a lie. In an employment form dated 1963, Rivera stated he was married to Carmen Lydia Torres, and the couple had two children in the U.S. In his narrative, Rivera said that he was a priest living in Spain in 1963.

Cornerstone also questioned Rivera's statement to various degrees, including three doctorates (Th.D., D.D., and Ph.D.), reporting that his known chronology did not allow enough time to have completed these degrees. Rivera allegedly admitted that he had received these degrees from a non-accredited entity sometimes referred to as a diploma mill located in the state of Colorado.

== Claims ==
Rivera said that the Jesuit order was responsible for the creation of communism, Islam and Nazism, and causing the World Wars, recession, the Jonestown Massacre, and the assassinations of Abraham Lincoln and John F. Kennedy (a Catholic). Rivera further stated that the Catholic Church wants to spread homosexuality and abortion and that the Charismatic movement is somehow a "front" for the Catholic Church. He further said, as have Protestant polemicists since Martin Luther's On the Babylonian Captivity of the Church, that the Popes are antichrists, and that the Catholic Church is the Whore of Babylon. He has also said that the Jesuits were the masterminds behind the Medieval Inquisition in the 13th century. The Jesuits were, in fact, founded August 15th, 1534.

Rivera also made several allegations about Islam, for which he did not offer proof. This includes allegations that Muhammad was manipulated by the Catholic Church to create Islam and destroy the Jews and other groups of Christians, and that Muhammad's first wife, Khadijah bint Khuwaylid, was actually a Catholic nun in an Arabian monastery, who was told by a bishop to marry Muhammad and create Islam. Rivera also alleged that the Vatican staged an apparition at Fátima (named after Fatimah, daughter of Muhammad) to cultivate favor with Muslims. He further says that it also staged the 1981 assassination attempt on Pope John Paul II using a Muslim as the marksman "to guilt-induce the Muslim world, bringing them still closer to the Catholic faith".

== Presence in "Chick Tracts" ==
Six of Jack Chick's full-length comics feature Rivera specifically: Alberto, Double Cross, The Godfathers, The Force, Four Horsemen, and The Prophet. He also wrote the introduction to Chick's republication of The Secret History of the Jesuits by Edmond Paris.

== Death ==
Rivera died in 1997 of colon cancer. His ministry was taken over by his widow, Nury Rivera.

== See also ==
- Jesuit conspiracy theories
- New World Order (conspiracy theory)
