= Maria Monk =

Canadian hoaxer

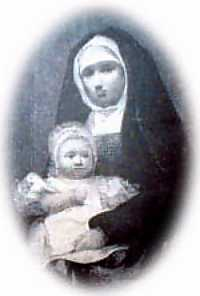
- A fictionalized engraving of Maria Monk, in a nun’s habit, holding a baby
- Born: June 27, 1816
- Died: 1849 (aged 32–33); Roosevelt Island, New York City, New York, U.S
- Partner: Graham Monk
- Children: 2 children
- Parent(s): William Monk; Isabella Mills

Maria Monk (June 27, 1816 – August 24, 1849) was a Canadian woman whose book Awful Disclosures of Maria Monk, or, The Hidden Secrets of a Nun’s Life in a Convent Exposed (1836) claimed to expose systematic sexual abuse of nuns and infanticide of the resulting children by Catholic priests in her convent in Montreal. The book is considered by scholars to be an anti-Catholic hoax.

Awful Disclosures of Maria Monk was published in January 1836. In it, Monk claimed that nuns of the Religious Hospitallers of St. Joseph of the Montreal convent of the Hôtel-Dieu, whom she called "the Black Nuns", were forced to have sex with the priests in the seminary next door. The priests supposedly entered the convent through a secret tunnel. If the sexual union produced a baby, it was baptized and then strangled and dumped into a lime pit in the basement. Uncooperative nuns disappeared.

Monk's story contains various inconsistencies. In her account, she stated that there were three convents in Montreal: "1st. The Congregational Nunnery. 2d. The Black Nunnery, or Convent of Sister Bourgeoise. 3d The Grey Nunnery." The Congregational Nuns were the Congregation of Notre Dame of Montreal, founded by Marguerite Bourgeoys, not the Sisters of Charity, as Monk stated at the beginning of her text; the Religious Hospitallers of St. Joseph, whose habits were black but who were not typically called "Black Nuns", operated the Hotel-Dieu, where Monk claimed that she entered and suffered, and it was not founded by "Sister Bourgeoise [sic]"; and it was the Sisters of Charity who were commonly known as the Grey Nuns.

It is known that Monk lived in an asylum in her early years and that one of the nuns mentioned in her story was actually a fellow patient in the asylum. There is some evidence that Monk had suffered a brain injury as a child.

"Her book, both hotly attacked and defended, continued to be read and believed even after her mother gave testimony that Maria had been somewhat addled ever since childhood, after she had rammed a pencil into her head." Richard Hofstadter, The Paranoid Style in American Politics

One possible result of this alleged injury could be that Monk might have been manipulated, and might not be able to distinguish between fact and fantasy. Another possible result of the alleged injury could be that Monk had little understanding of the devastating result of her claims. It has been suggested, though not proven, that Monk was manipulated into playing a role for profit by her publisher or her ghost writers. Scholars consider the book a hoax.

== Atmosphere of anti-Catholic sensationalism ==
Monk’s book was published in an American atmosphere of anti-Catholic hostility (partly fueled by early 19th-century Irish and German Catholic immigration to the U.S.) and followed the 1834 Ursuline Convent Riots near Boston. These were triggered by an incident in which one of the nuns left the convent but was persuaded to return on the following day by her superior, Mother Mary St. George, and by the Bishop of Boston, the Most Reverend Benedict Fenwick. This incident immediately gave rise to the claim that the woman was being held in the convent against her will; a mob invaded and then burned down the convent in an effort to free her.

In 1835, Rebecca Reed published an anti-Catholic, gothic novel, a highly-colored account of her six months as an Episcopalian charity pupil at the Ursuline convent school in Charlestown, Massachusetts. Reed herself died of tuberculosis shortly after the publication of her book; her disease was widely believed to have been caused by the austerities to which she had been subjected at the convent.

Reed’s book became a bestseller, and Monk or her handlers might have hoped to cash in on the evident market for anti-Catholic horror fiction. Monk’s claims might have been modeled on the gothic novels that were popular in the 18th and early 19th centuries, a literary genre that had already been used to stoke anti-Catholic sentiments in such works as Denis Diderot's La Religieuse. Monk’s story epitomizes the genre-defining elements of a young, innocent woman being trapped in a remote, old, gloomily picturesque estate, where she learns dark secrets and escapes after harrowing adventures.

Monk claimed that she had lived in the convent for seven years, became pregnant, and fled because she did not want her baby destroyed. She told her story to a Protestant minister, Rev. John Jay Slocum, in New York, who encouraged her to repeat it to a wider audience. According to the American Protestant Vindicator, by July 1836 the book had sold 26,000 copies. Other publishers later issued books that supported Monk’s claims or were close imitators, or else they published tracts that refuted the tale. Historian Richard Hofstadter called it, in his 1964 essay The Paranoid Style in American Politics, "[p]robably the most widely read contemporary book in the United States before Uncle Tom's Cabin." Historian James M. O'Toole claimed it sold more copies than any book published before the American Civil War, save Uncle Tom's Cabin.

== Public furor ==
Monk’s book caused a public outcry. Protestants in Montreal, Quebec, demanded an investigation, and the local bishop organized one. The inquiry found no evidence to support the claims, though many American Protestants refused to accept the conclusion and accused the bishop of dishonesty.

Colonel William Leete Stone Sr., a Protestant newspaper editor from New York City, undertook his own investigation. In October 1836, his team entered the convent and found that the descriptions in the book did not match the convent's interior. During their first visit, the investigators were denied entry to the basement and the nuns’ personal quarters. There was much dispute regarding the existence of a tunnel leading to the nuns' residence. There were disputes regarding "renovations to the nuns residence and if the "tunnel " had been filled in or not. Stone returned to New York, interviewed Monk and concluded that she had never been in the convent. On a later visit, he was given total access to all quarters. Stone’s team found no evidence that Monk had ever lived in the convent.

Monk disappeared from the public view. It was later discovered that she had spent the seven-year period in question in the Magdalen Asylum for Wayward Girls. One critic points out that a nun character in her book, Jane Ray, was actually residing with Monk at the Magdalen Asylum, rather than at the Hotel Dieu Nunnery. The Magdalen asylum building was a very small wooden building, quite different from the described nunnery of the book Monk wrote.

Many details of the story seem to have originated with Monk's legal guardian, William K. Hoyte, an anti-Catholic activist, and his associates. The writers later sued each other for a share of the considerable profits, while Monk was left destitute.

== Later life ==
Monk traveled to Philadelphia, Pennsylvania, with a lover whom historians often identify as Graham Monk. She penned a sequel, Further Disclosures of Maria Monk. When she gave birth to another child, Oliver (a brother to William), out of wedlock in 1838, most of her supporters abandoned her.

Monk died on August 24, 1849 of delirium tremens at the Penitentiary Hospital (Roosevelt Island).

The Boston Pilot published this obituary for her on September 8, 1849: "There is an end of Maria Monk; she died in the almshouse, still cooking as was her wont. Blackwell's Island, New York, on Tuesday".

Awful Disclosures remained in print for years afterwards and was occasionally revived. There appear to have been two Australian editions (1920, 1940). The last recorded unsupplemented facsimile edition was published in 1977.

== Bibliography and subsequent editions ==
Posthumous editions of Maria Monk were published in 1837 (New York: Howe and Bates), 1920 (Melbourne: Wyatt and Watt), 1940? (Brisbane: Clarion Propaganda Series),1962 (Hamden: Archon), and were often reprints or facsimiles of the original. In 1975, a microform format was made available from New Haven, Connecticut. ISBN references are available for the following editions:

- Maria Monk: Awful Disclosures of Maria Monk and the Hotel Dieu Monastery of Montreal. New York: Arno Press: 1977: ISBN 0-405-09962-2
- Maria Monk: Awful Disclosures of Maria Monk. Manchester: Milner: 1985: ISBN 0-665-38362-2.
- Maria Monk: Awful Disclosures of Maria Monk. London: Senate: 1997: ISBN 1-85958-499-3

The book has been translated into some languages, for instance, Dutch:

- Maria Monk de zwarte non [Dutch translation] naar het Engels door L. von Alvensleben uit het Hoogduitsch, geïllustreerde uitgave. Amsterdam: August Koster ca. 1910;

and Ukrainian:

- Strashni Tainy Monastyrs'kykh Muriv, abo, Vidkryti sekrety monashoho zhyttia po monastyrakh (Terrible Secrets of the Monastery Walls, or, Revealed Secrets of Monastic Life in Monasteries), "3rd complete and illustrated edition, translated from English by M.M.B.", Winnipeg: Ukrainska Knyharnia 1930.

== See also ==
- Ursuline Convent Riots
- Anti-Catholicism
- Black propaganda (propaganda claimed to be a document from those it's meant to discredit)
- Misery literature
- Literary hoax
