= John Dowling (pastor) =

American Baptist minister and author (1807–1878)

John William Dowling
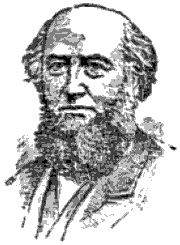
- Portrait of John Dowling
- Born: May 13, 1807; Pevensey, Sussex, England
- Died: July 4, 1878 (aged 71); Middletown, New York, U.S.
- Occupations: Baptist minister; author
- Spouse: Maria S. Perkins
- Children: John William Dowling Jr.

John William Dowling (May 13, 1807 – July 4, 1878) was an American Baptist minister and author noted for his religious writings and anti-Catholic polemics in the nineteenth century.

== Early life ==
John Dowling was born in Pevensey, Sussex, England, to parents who were members of the Church of England. At age seven, his mother converted to the Baptist faith under minister Thomas Gough's influence, and the family moved to London, where Dowling attended Sunday school at Eagle Street Baptist Church, then led by pastor Joseph Ivimey.

In 1832, Dowling emigrated to New York City with his wife and two children and joined the Baptist church in Catskill, where he was ordained.

== Career ==
Dowling served pastorates in Catskill, New York (1832–1834), and subsequently led Baptist congregations in New York City, Providence, Rhode Island, Newport, Rhode Island, and Philadelphia. He accepted a call to the Tabernacle Baptist Church in Utica, New York, before moving to Providence’s First Baptist Church, where Brown University awarded him a Master of Arts.

In New York City, Dowling became known for his anti-Catholic writings and debates, publishing The History of Romanism (1845), and engaging Archbishop John Hughes in public disputation.

He later ministered in Philadelphia at the Sansom Street Baptist Church. On 30 June 1878, Dowling was admitted to the Middletown State Homeopathic Hospital in Middletown, New York, where he died on 4 July 1878.

== Works ==
According to the National Cyclopaedia of American Biography, Dowling's publications include:

- Vindication of the Baptists
- Exposition of the Prophecies (1840)
- Defense of the Protestant Scriptures (1843)
- History of Romanism (1845)
- Power of Illustration
- Nights and Mornings
- Judson Offering

He also edited a conference hymnbook (1868), Noel's work on Baptism, the works of Lorenzo Dow, Conyers Middleton's On the Conformity of Popery and Paganism, the Memoir of the Missionary Jacob Thomas, and translated Cote's French work on Romanism.
