= Ursuline Convent riots =

Mob violence and destruction of Catholic Convent in Boston

Coordinates: 42.389°N 71.084°W

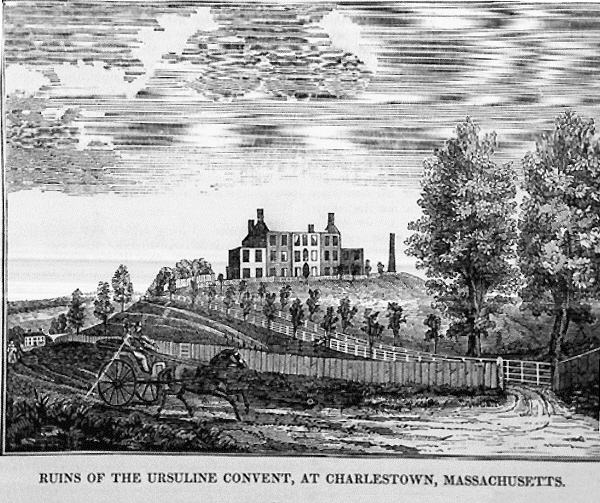
"Ruins of the Ursuline Convent, at Charlestown, Massachusetts," historical print, 1834, collection of the Charlestown Historical Society.

The Ursuline Convent riots occurred on August 11 and 12, 1834, in Charlestown, Massachusetts, near Boston, in what is now Somerville, Massachusetts. During the riot, a convent of Roman Catholic Ursuline nuns was burned down by a Protestant mob. The event was triggered by reported abuse of a member of their religious order, and was fueled by the rebirth of extreme anti-Catholic sentiment in antebellum New England.

== Background ==
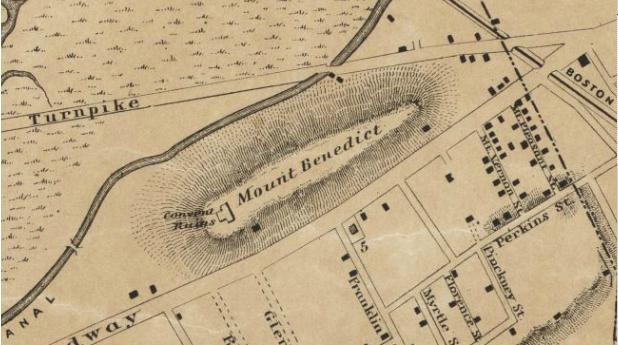
Old map of Somerville showing the convent ruins marked on Benedict Hill, formerly located between Broadway and the Middlesex Canal. This location is now at Michigan Ave in The States neighborhood near Interstate 93.

From the founding of the Massachusetts Bay Colony, little tolerance was exhibited by the Puritan leadership even toward Protestant views that did not accord with theirs. When the Province of Massachusetts Bay was established in 1692, its charter protected freedom of worship for Protestants in general, but specifically excluded Roman Catholics. After American independence, there was a broadening of tolerance in the nation, but this tolerance did not particularly take hold in Massachusetts. The arrival of many Catholic Irish immigrants ignited sectarian tensions, which were abetted by the Protestant religious revivals of the Second Great Awakening.

The idea of establishing an Ursuline school in Boston originated with Father John Thayer, a Massachusetts native who converted to Roman Catholicism after a transformative experience in Rome in 1783. Thayer died in 1815, having recruited several nuns in Ireland for the project, and donated his estate to the cause. In 1820, the Most Reverend Jean-Louis Lefebvre de Cheverus, bishop of the newly created diocese of Boston, oversaw the opening of the convent in the rectory of the Boston cathedral. A school for girls was set up in the convent, intended to educate the area's poor. Approximately 100 students were eventually enrolled. The early years of the school were plagued by tuberculosis, which claimed the lives of the convent's first mother superior and several of the sisters. A new leader, Mother Mary Edmond St. George, was recruited from the Ursuline convent in Trois Rivieres, Quebec, where the Boston nuns had trained.

Mother St. George and Bishop Benedict Fenwick envisioned a larger convent and school property, in a country setting, that would cater to Boston's wealthy (and primarily liberal Unitarian) upper class, who would thus fund the expansion of the Catholic mission in the area. In 1826, the Ursulines purchased land on Ploughed Hill (later called Convent Hill or Mount Benedict), in a section of Charlestown that is now in Somerville. A fine brick convent and school were built, with the sisters moving into the facility in 1827, and classes beginning in 1828. By 1834 there were 47 students, only six of whom were Catholic. According to Jenny Franchot, the author of a history of the riots, the lower classes of Boston, predominantly conservative Trinitarian Protestants, came to see the convent school as representing a union between two classes of people—the upper class and Catholics—both of which they distrusted. The antipathy toward Catholics was fanned by anti-Catholic publications and by prominent preachers, including Lyman Beecher. Anti-Catholic violence occurred in Boston at a low level in the 1820s, with attacks on the homes of Irish Catholic laborers taking place in 1823, 1826, and 1828. Boston's mayor was petitioned in 1832 to take steps against the recurring violence. Charlestown, then separate from Boston, was not immune to the sectarian violence, seeing several attacks on Irish Catholics in 1833. Its population of about 10,000 was predominantly lower class Protestant laborers. Specific acts of violence committed against the convent and the Catholic establishment in Charlestown included the killing of one of its dogs in 1829, the burning of its stable in 1830, and the destruction of an Irish bar in 1833 by Protestant rioters. There was also simmering hostility over the establishment of a Catholic cemetery on nearby Bunker Hill, with local Protestants agitating that it be closed. These tensions were further heightened by a court case concerning the cemetery, in which the district court ruled in 1833 in favor of the diocese and against a restrictive law enacted by Charlestown selectmen.

== Rumors ==
Roman Catholic institutions, especially convents, were frequently rumored by anti-Catholics to be dens of immorality and corruption, and the Charlestown facility in particular was seen by the lower class Protestants as a place where Catholics and wealthy Unitarians conspired against them. A Boston newspaper in 1830 published a false story of a Protestant orphan spirited into the facility after manipulating a large sum of money from its caretakers. The story of Rebecca Reed, a young Episcopalian woman from Boston who attended the school in 1831 further inflamed resentment against the institution. She attended the school as a charity scholar: a day student for whom the convent waived tuition fees. In 1832, she declared her intent to enter the Ursuline novitiate, but left the convent after six months as a postulant (originally one who makes a request or demand, hence a candidate). At some time after her departure, she began writing a manuscript entitled Six Months in a Convent, in which she suggested the nuns tried to force her into adopting their religion. This work would be published in 1835, but her story was known in Charlestown, where she was sheltered after her departure.

== July–August 1834 ==
On the evening of July 28, 1834, Sister Mary John (Elizabeth Harrison), a nun teaching at the convent, made her way to a sympathetic family that lived nearby, escorted by Edward Cutter and John Runey, two anti-Catholic residents of Charlestown. She was convinced to return to the convent the next day by Bishop Fenwick. This episode prompted rumors that she was being held against her will and even tortured at the convent. Local newspapers, on hearing of the story, began publishing accounts of a "mysterious woman" kept against her will in the convent. As the accounts spread, concern over the fate of the "mysterious woman" (with details of her situation conflated with those of Rebecca Reed) appear to have incited the largely Protestant workmen of Charlestown to take action. Meetings of increasing size took place at a local school that were said to be the organizational meetings for the events that transpired. On August 10, placards were found posted in Charlestown stating: "To the Selectmen of Charlestown!! Gentlemen: It is currently reported that a mysterious affair has lately happened at the Nunnery in Charlestown, now it is your duty gentlemen to have this affair investigated immediately[;] if not the Truckmen of Boston will demolish the Nunnery thursday [sic] night—August 14."

=== The first riot: August 11, 1834 ===
By the end of the first week of August, both Cutter and the Charlestown selectmen were sufficiently disturbed by the rumors of impending action against the convent that they decided to investigate the situation further. With the permission of the Mother Superior, Mr. Cutter returned to the convent to interview Sister Mary John on August 9. He reported that he

was informed by her that she was at liberty to leave the Institution at any time she chose. The same statement was also made by the Superior, who farther remarked, that, in the present state of public feeling, she should prefer to have her leave.

On Sunday, August 10, Reverend Beecher preached anti-Catholic sermons at three different Boston churches, in part railing specifically against Catholic schools set up to educate Protestant children. On Monday, August 11, a group of selectmen was admitted to the convent and given a detailed tour by Sister Mary John. As they left the convent, the men were subjected to verbal abuse by the school's students, inquiring if they had found the supposedly missing woman. The selectmen then prepared a statement for publication the next day, that was intended to reassure the public that the woman was in good health, that she was not being held against her will, and that the convent was fit to live in.

Although rumors of a planned disturbance had reached the convent by August 11, neither the nuns, the students, nor the parents appeared to believe that anything serious would occur. Franchot even reports one student comparing the day to a holiday.

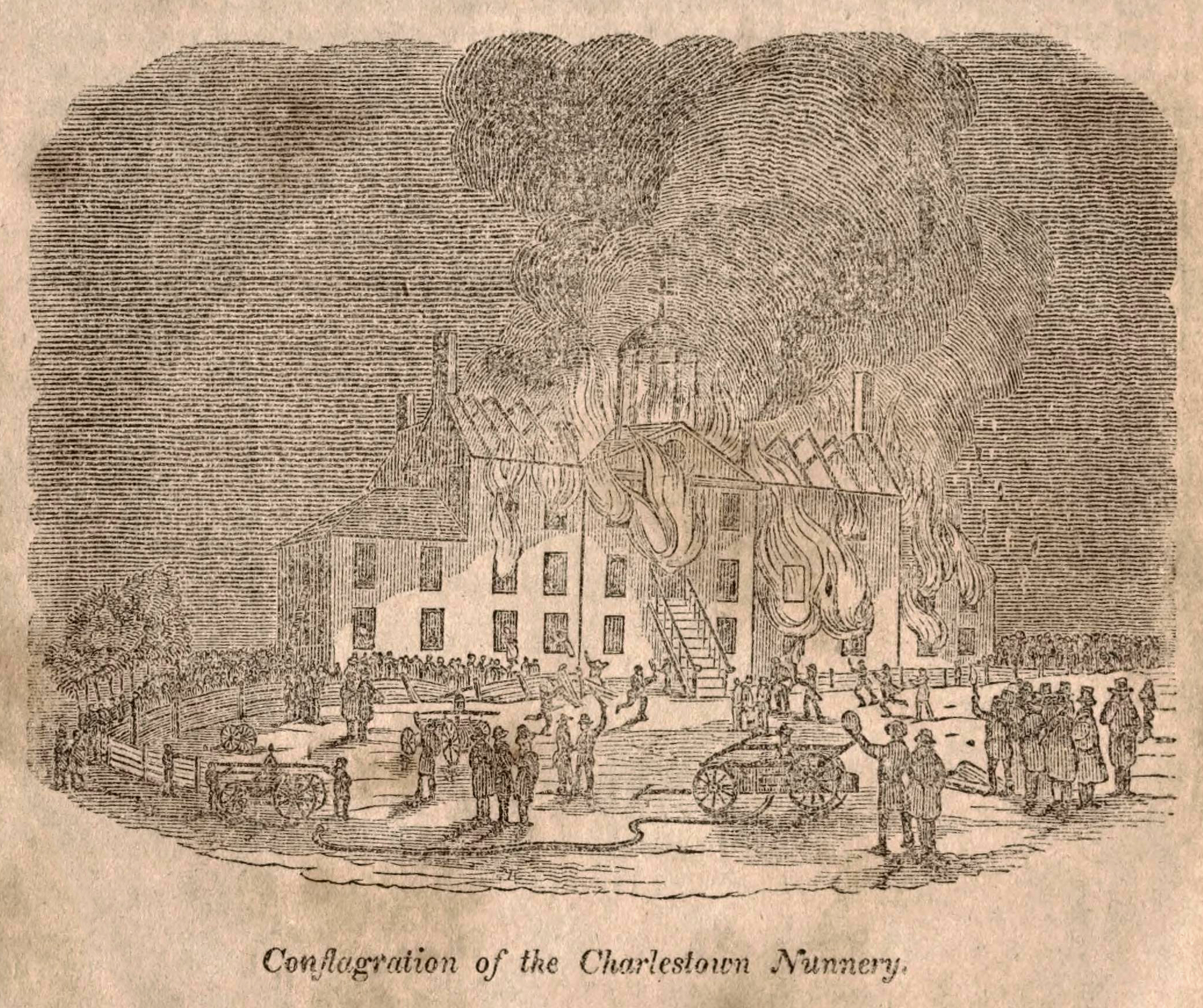
Burning of the nunnery

At about 8:00 on the evening of August 11, a group of angry Protestant citizens gathered outside the door to the convent. They began to call for the release of the "mysterious lady". A witness to the riot reported that a nun came to the window and asked the crowd to disperse. According to this witness, on seeing the nun, the crowd offered their protection to the nun. At this point the mother superior appeared and stated that the nuns did not need any sort of protection, and that the entire household was in bed. She further threatened the crowd with retaliation from the Catholic population of Boston: "The Bishop has twenty thousand of the vilest Irishmen at his command, and you may read your riot act till your throats are sore, but you'll not quell them."

The crowd eventually dispersed, only to return several hours later. At about 11:00, a crowd of 50–60 men (as estimated by the Boston Evening Transcript; the Mercantile Journal estimated the crowd as between 150 and 200) set fire to tar barrels on the convent grounds. Several fire companies were called to the scene, but declined to intervene, instead joining a crowd of spectators, which eventually grew to around 2,000 people. No city in the United States at the time had a professional police force.

Soon after the tar barrels had been set alight, the crowd broke down doors and windows to enter the convent and began to ransack the buildings. The nuns and pupils began to leave from the back and hid in the garden. At about midnight, the rioters set fire to the buildings, which burned to the ground within an hour or two, leaving them in ruins. They also desecrated the convent's tomb, in which several sisters were interred. The nuns and children made their way to a house on Winter Hill, where they were given shelter.

=== Response: the Faneuil Hall, Charlestown, and Cathedral meetings ===
At 11:00 the following morning, Theodore Lyman, the mayor of Boston, invited the public to a meeting at Faneuil Hall to discuss "measures relative to the riot at Charlestown". The meeting took place at 1:00 that afternoon, and led to the adoption of a resolution which, among other things, nominated a committee to investigate the riot and events leading up to it. The resolution expressed the community's outrage at the events and provided for a reward to anyone providing information on the leaders of future similar events, as well as directing the investigative committee to discuss the possibility of indemnifying the diocese of Boston for the loss of property, which was not covered by insurance.

The selectmen of Charlestown also called a public meeting on August 12, passing similar resolutions condemning the violence. The resolution also set up a "Committee of Vigilance", with authority to investigate the incident and offer a reward for information leading to the arrest of the perpetrators.

On the same day, Bishop Fenwick called a meeting of the Catholic citizenry of the Boston area. He encouraged the audience to forgo revenge as incompatible with "the religion of Jesus Christ". He also thanked the public authorities for their stand against the violence, and expressed confidence that they would prevent further outbreaks from occurring. He also sent priests to intercept the movements of Irish Catholic workers from Lowell, Massachusetts and other communities who were reported to be coming by train to Boston to exact revenge.

=== The second riot: August 12, 1834 ===
In keeping with the resolutions adopted in the meeting at Faneuil Hall, an independent militia company was activated, its members stationed not only around Faneuil Hall, but at the city arsenal, the Cathedral of the Holy Cross, the Catholic church in Charlestown, and the house of Edward Cutter. Notably, no troops were posted around the remains of the convent.

At about 10:00 on the evening of Wednesday, August 12, a crowd gathered outside the arsenal. Finding it guarded, they moved first to the cathedral, then to the city hall, and finally to the unguarded convent. They reentered the grounds, destroyed the gardens and orchards, set bonfires, and pulled down fences. The mob then left the grounds and dispersed a few hours later.

== Investigation, arrests, and trial ==
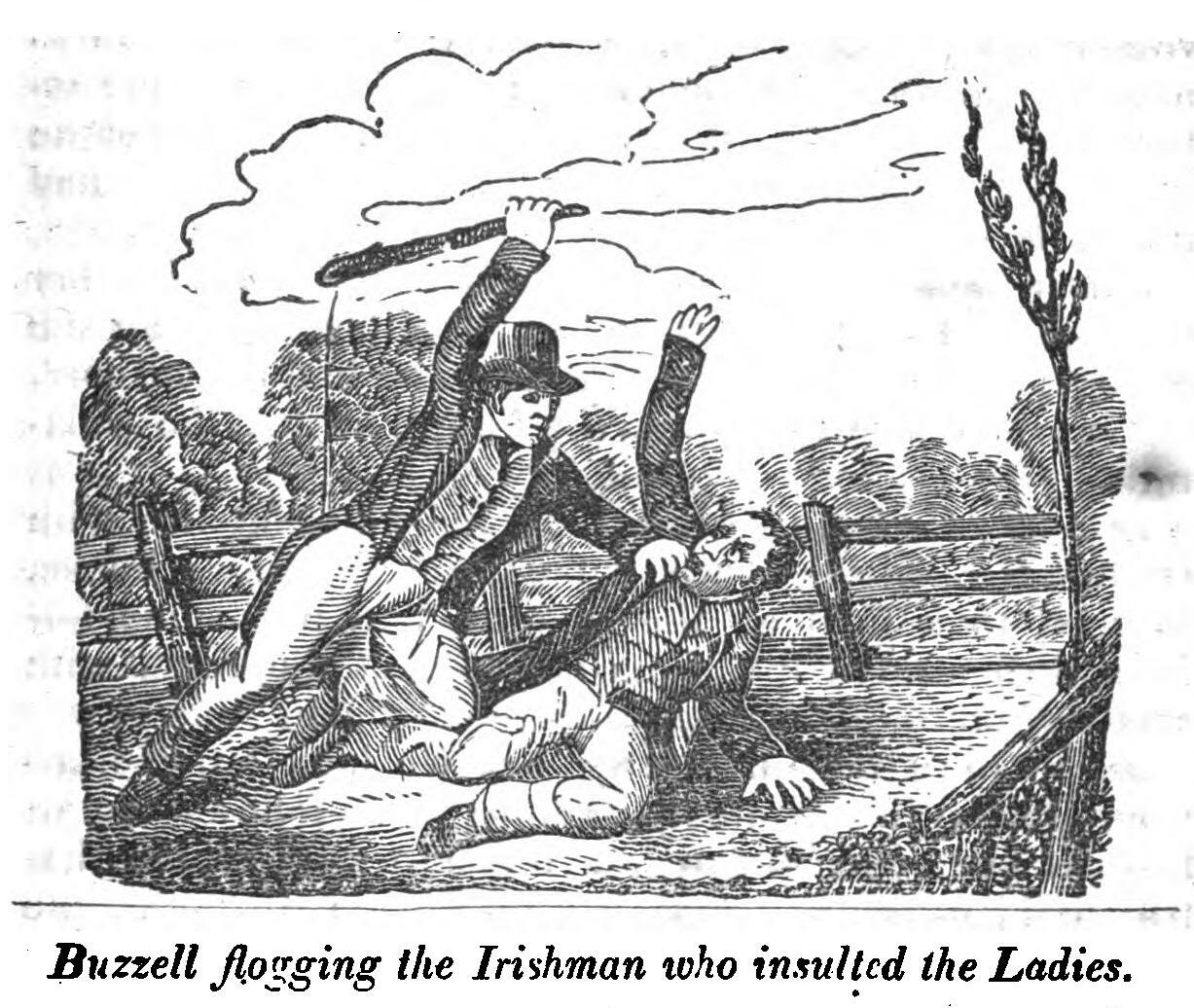
Illustration of instigator John R. Buzzell

The committee established by Mayor Lyman met every day except Sundays from August 13 to August 27. Testimony heard by this committee, and by the Charlestown selectmen's committee, led to thirteen arrests, of which eight were for the capital crimes of arson or burglary.

The trials of the defendants began on December 2, 1834 with the trial of John R. Buzzell, the self-confessed ringleader of the mob. State Attorney General James T. Austin protested the early date of the trial, since death threats had been issued against any potential witnesses for the prosecution. Buzzell himself later stated, "The testimony against me was point blank and sufficient to have convicted twenty men, but somehow I proved an alibi, and the jury brought in a victory of not guilty, after having been out for twenty-one hours." Eventually, twelve of the thirteen defendants were acquitted. The thirteenth, a sixteen-year-old who had participated in book-burning at the riot, was convicted and sentenced to life imprisonment at hard labor. He was pardoned by Governor John Davis in response to multiple petitions, including one signed by five thousand citizens of Boston whose signatories included Bishop Fenwick and Mother Superior Mary St. George.

== Role of Lyman Beecher ==
Rev. Lyman Beecher, a prominent Presbyterian minister, president of the Lane Theological Seminary, was preaching in the Boston area during the summer of 1834. "Catholics blamed Lyman, and charged that the churls had been 'goaded on by Dr. Lyman Beecher', but Lyman insisted that the sermon 'to which the mob ascribed was preached before his presence in Boston was generally known, and on the very evening of the riot, some miles distant from the scene, and that probably not one of the rioters had heard it or even 'knew of its delivery'. Nevertheless, the convent was burned, and just at the season when Lyman was alerting Massachusetts to danger from the 'despotic character and hostile designs of popery'."

Authors disagree as to whether Lyman Beecher's three anti-catholic speeches triggered the burning. For example, Ira Leonard, author of American Nativism, 1830-1860, notes that the three anti-catholic speeches "by Lyman Beecher" ultimately "ignited the spark["]. This statement implies that some of the individuals involved in the burning attended one of Beecher's three sermons. Conversely, Ray Billington understands the two events to be more coincidental. Billington notes that, although the convent burned the evening of Beecher's sermons, the group of working-class men who organized the burning met on three separate occasions, two of which proceeded the Beecher's sermons. Furthermore, Beecher spoke at upper-class churches which the workers would not have attended. "In all probability," Billington comments, "the [convent] would have been attacked whether or not these sermons were delivered."

== Aftermath ==
The investigative committee formed by Mayor Lyman had recommended that the city of Charlestown or the county of Middlesex indemnify the diocese of Boston for the loss of the convent property; or, if they did not act, that the Massachusetts legislature investigate the matter and provide compensation. Following this recommendation, Bishop Fenwick petitioned the legislature in January 1835 for indemnification to rebuild the convent and school, arguing that the state had been derelict in its duty of protecting private property. The committee which heard the argument of the diocese resolved that the legislature authorize the governor to provide compensation to the trustees of the convent. The resolution was defeated by an overwhelming majority on the floor of the House, with broad opposition by largely Protestant rural representatives. The legislature passed a resolution condemning the actions of the rioters.

In 1839, the state enacted legislation holding communities legally responsible for property destruction by mobs within their jurisdiction. Renewed proposals for restitution were brought before the assembly in 1841, 1842, 1843, and 1844, generally promoted by prominent Boston liberal and high-minded Protestants. Each time, the motion to indemnify the diocese failed. In 1846, the assembly voted to provide the diocese with $10,000. The diocese rejected the offer, estimating the actual loss at approximately $100,000. The request was presented again to the assembly in 1853 and 1854, and again was defeated each time.

The Ursuline nuns were at first sheltered by the Sisters of Charity, and then moved to a leased house in Roxbury. Following the acquittal of John Buzzell, rumors began circulating that their house, along with the two Catholic churches in Boston, were targets of planned attacks. In early 1835, following the failed petition to the legislature, the nuns were relocated to convents in Quebec. In 1838, some of the nuns returned, part of an attempt by Bishop Fenwick to revive the convent and school. The attempt failed, and the Boston Ursulines were formally disbanded in 1840–1841, with most moving to convents in Quebec or New Orleans.

== Legacy ==
The ruins of the convent remained in place for many years afterward, presenting a stark contrast to the nearby Bunker Hill Monument, completed in 1843. The property was eventually turned over to the Diocese of Boston, which sold it in 1875. Between then and the 1890s, Ploughed Hill was leveled, used to fill the nearby Middlesex Canal and marshlands along the Mystic River, and its site has since been built over with housing. Stones from the convent ruins were used to build an arch in the vestibule of the Cathedral of the Holy Cross in Boston (the cathedral church of the Archdiocese of Boston). A commemorative marker, placed by the Knights of Columbus in 1915, stands near the corner of Broadway and Illinois Avenue in East Somerville.

The Ursulines were invited back to the Boston area in 1946, when a new Ursuline Academy was established on Arlington Street in Boston. The school is now located in Dedham.
