= Belomancy =

Ancient art of divination by use of arrows

Belomancy, also bolomancy, is the ancient art of divination by use of arrows. The word is built upon Ancient Greek: βέλος, romanized: belos, lit. 'arrow, dart', and μαντεία, manteia, 'divination'. Belomancy was anciently practiced at least by Babylonians, Greeks, Arabs and Scythians.

== Practice ==
Arrows were typically marked with occult symbols, with feathers for every known method. In one example, different possible answers to a given question were written and tied to each arrow; for example, three arrows would be marked with the phrases, God orders it me, God forbids it me, and the third would be blank: the arrow that flew the furthest indicated the answer. Another method involves the same idea, but instead without shooting arrows. They would simply be shuffled in a quiver, worn preferably on the back, and the first arrow to be drawn indicated the answer. If a blank arrow was drawn, they would redraw.

== History ==
Use of belomancy dates to ancient times; it is likely mentioned in the Book of Ezekiel 21:21, shown below in the original Hebrew and translated to English in the New American Standard Bible:

כִּי-עָמַד מֶלֶךְ-בָּבֶל אֶל-אֵם הַדֶּרֶךְ, בְּרֹאשׁ שְׁנֵי הַדְּרָכִים--לִקְסָם-קָסֶם: קִלְקַל בַּחִצִּים שָׁאַל בַּתְּרָפִים, רָאָה בַּכָּבֵד.

"For the king of Babylon stands at the parting of the way, at the head of the two ways, to use divination; he shakes the arrows, he consults the teraphim, he looks at the liver."

Jerome agrees with this understanding of the verse, and observes that the practice was frequent among the Assyrians and Babylonians. (Something like it is also mentioned in Hosea 4:12, although a staff or rod is used instead of arrows, which is rhabdomancy rather than belomancy.) (Note: Grotius (as well as Jerome) confounds the two together, and shows that it prevailed much among the Magi, Chaldeans, and Scythians, from which it passed to the Slavonians, and then to the Germans, whom Tacitus observes to make use of it.)

=== Islam ===
Verse 3 of Surah Al-Ma'idah in the Qur'an forbids belomancy (الأزلام), while verse 90 of Surah Al-Ma'idah states literally

يَـٰٓأَيُّهَا ٱلَّذِينَ ءَامَنُوٓا۟ إِنَّمَا ٱلْخَمْرُ وَٱلْمَيْسِرُ وَٱلْأَنصَابُ وَٱلْأَزْلَـٰمُ رِجْسٌۭ مِّنْ عَمَلِ ٱلشَّيْطَـٰن

(Note: Phonetic transliteration: Yā 'Ayyuhā Al-Ladhīna 'Āmanū 'Innamā Al-Khamru Wa Al-Maysiru Wa Al-'Anşābu Wa Al-'Azlāmu Rijsun Min `Amali Ash-Shayţāni Fājtanibūhu La`allakum Tufliĥūn)فَٱجْتَنِبُوهُ لَعَلَّكُمْ تُفْلِحُونَ

"O you who have believed, indeed, intoxicants, gambling, sacrificing on stone alters to other than Allah, and divining arrows are but defilement from the work of Satan, so avoid it that you may be successful."

==== Pre-Islamic Arabia ====
Belomancy is also attested in pre-Islamic Arab religion. In his Book of Idols, early Muslim historian Ibn al-Kalbi mentions that there were seven divination arrows in front of the statue of Hubal in the Kaaba.
