= Robert Morey (pastor) =

American theologian and academic

Robert A. Morey (November 13, 1946 – January 5, 2019) was a Christian apologist and pastor who wrote a number of books and pamphlets. He criticized Islam, Wicca, and non-Evangelical Christian beliefs. He was the founder of the unaccredited California Biblical University and Seminary.

== Biography ==
Morey ran Faith Defenders, an organization dedicated to Christian apologetics, and started the related Faith Community Church in Orange, California as pastor, which quickly closed on his departure to Pennsylvania where he began his ministry. He received a B.A. from Covenant College. Morey then earned a Master of Divinity and Doctor of Ministry from the fully accredited Westminster Theological Seminary.

Morey received another Doctorate (D.Litt. and Phil.) from The University of America which is authorized to grant bachelor's, master's, and doctoral degrees by the State of Florida and the U.S. UA is also registered as a high school in California. Other degrees and honors held by Morey include a Doctor of Philosophy in Islamic Studies from the unaccredited Louisiana Baptist University (although elsewhere he has said it is actually a doctorate in theology with an emphasis on Islam) and a Doctor of Divinity, usually an honorary degree bestowed upon someone who has made distinguished contributions to the field of religion, from Faith Theological Seminary. His honorary degree is from Faith Theological Seminary in Gujranwala, Pakistan, and the Pakistan seminary created controversy over whether this degree was bestowed (and later rescinded) by them.

Morey assisted in translation for the International Standard Version of the Bible; he worked on the "base translation" of Psalms chapters 1 through 65 and Psalms chapter 91.

In 2002, the conservative website WorldNetDaily published a fund-raising plea on behalf of Morey's Research and Education Foundation. He was asking for $1.2 million to "launch a national crusade" against radical Islam. Tax records obtained by the Weekly show the fund-raiser failed to hit its target, raising just $92,707 for his Research and Education Foundation in 2002.

In 2005, Morey filed for and received nonprofit status for his Faith Defenders Ministry by turning it into an Irvine church. There, Morey offered membership in the Crusader's Club, which lists four membership levels along with corresponding dues and benefits, ranging from Crusader ($300 per year earns you a CD of the month) to King Richard's Court ($5,000 per year gets you the CD, a mug, a subscription to Morey's Journal of Biblical Apologetics, Morey's private e-mail address, a piece of battle armor and an invitation to the annual Crusader's Club banquet).

Morey's wife, Anne, died June 3, 2012, in Florida, where the couple were celebrating their 40th wedding anniversary. According to police, "Anne Morey was planning to dive with her husband, 65-year-old Robert Morey... But he discovered he did not have enough weight. His wife told him she would go ahead and dive to the bottom and wait for him there" and when he came back she was dead.

== Claims and work ==
=== Dirty bombs in the United States ===
In March 2002, Morey was interviewed by Mark Ellis, assistant pastor at Calvary Evangelical Free Church in Laguna Beach. Based on that conversation, Ellis wrote "Islam Expert Warns of [Three] Nuclear Terror Devices Inside U.S.," an article for the Christian news service ASSIST. Morey explained in the interview "I have Middle Eastern friends throughout the U.S. who continually feed me information as to what the terrorists are up to". "I, in turn, feed that information to the FBI and Naval Intelligence. I've been right so many times the FBI showed up at my house, suspicious as to whether or not I was somehow involved—because I knew too much. I simply pointed out to them they don't have their ear to the ground in the Middle Eastern community."

=== Anti-Islamic comic book ===
In Spring 2006 the Fullerton, California based Davidson Press and Morey fought over the rights to publish the comic book Mohammed's Believe It or Else!. Davidson Press allowed internet users to download the comics for free until the Danish cartoons controversy drew interest to anti-Islamic comic books (the website went from 1,000 visitors to 180,000 visitors a week). At that point "Morey — who owns the copyright to MBIE—demanded that Davidson Press cease free distribution" and "refused Davidson Press's demand to be reimbursed for the costs of translating MBIE into 34 languages and maintaining islamcomicbook.com."

Davidson accused Morey of stopping the free downloading for money, since the comic is on sale for $6.95 on Morey's website. The publisher accused Morey of having "questionable ethics," but still recommends his books.

=== Islamic writings ===
Morey has written several books condemning Islam. In The Islamic Invasion, he challenges the Islamic claims that Allah is the same God as the God of the Christian Bible, that Muhammad was God's prophet, and that the Quran contains the words of God.

Morey has also written predictions that World War III will be caused by Islam. According to an article in the Orange County Weekly, in November 2001 Morey told a San Diego church audience that he had advised the State Department to blow up Mecca and Medina (Muslim holy cities) in order to win the war on terror quickly, but the State Department had not taken his advice because it is "full of wusses." Daniel Pipes said of Morey in a 1998 Middle East Quarterly book review that Robert Morey "sees Islam primarily as 'a form of cultural imperialism' that seeks to impose the ways of seventh-century Arabia on twentieth-century America." A detailed (18 page) criticism of Morey's methods has been written by Shabir Ally, President of the Islamic Information and Da'wah Centre International, Toronto, Canada, who charges Morey with deception, contradictions, and poor scholarship.

One of the better known and most controversial assertions Morey made about Islam is that God in Islam is in origin the "moon god" Hubal, a deity worshipped at the Kaaba in pre-Islamic Arabia." Morey argues that the same name of God of Islam, Arabic Allah, was an epithet of Hubal's in pre-Islamic Mecca. He also cites a 1950s era archeological excavation in Hazor, Israel, in what was ancient Galilee, in which a decapitated male statue was unearthed which some archaeologists thought might be Hubal. Morley claims that this provides that moon worship existed in Arabia. He argues that Muhammad adapted it to create Allah, thus supposedly explaining the use of crescent moon imagery in Islam. This "Allah as moon god" theory has been widely repeated, adapted and criticised.

=== Claims against atheists ===
Jon Nelson also has criticized Morey for incorrect quotes. Nelson notes that in Morey's The New Atheism (1986) he quoted Nicholas Capaldi's book The Art of Deception as an example of atheist deception, but the "problem is that Capaldi never says this (or anything like it) on this or on any other page. Morey has numerous other false quotes attributed to Capaldi, such as: 'Refuse to be convinced. Even if you feel that he has a good argument and that your case is weaker, refuse to be convinced of your opponent's case'. Nowhere does Capaldi advocate, as Morey accuses him of doing, that atheists should 'use any invalid or deceptive argument as long as it helps him (to) win his case.'" Nelson goes on to say that, "However, Morey has an 'out'. There are no actual quotation marks on these alleged quotes."

== Death ==
Morey died on January 5, 2019.

== Works ==
- The Dooyeweerdian concept of the word of God. Nutley, NJ: Presbyterian & Reformed, 1974.
- How to answer a Jehovah's Witness. Minneapolis: Bethany Fellowship, 1980. ISBN 0-87123-206-5.
- Horoscopes and the Christian. Minneapolis, MN: Bethany House, 1981. ISBN 0-87123-202-2.
- How to answer a Mormon. Minneapolis, MN: Bethany House, 1983. ISBN 0-87123-260-X.
- Death and the Afterlife. Minneapolis, MN: Bethany House, 1984.
- The new atheism and the erosion of freedom. Minneapolis, MN: Bethany House, 1986. ISBN 0-87123-889-6, ISBN 978-0-87123-889-4.
- Battle of the Gods. Southbridge, MA: Crown Publications, 1989. ISBN 0-925703-00-1
- The origins and teachings of Freemasonry. Southbridge, MA: Crowne Publications, 1990. ISBN 0-925703-28-1.
- Islam unveiled: the true desert storm. Shermans Dale, PA: Scholars Press, 1991. ISBN 0-9629394-0-4
- The Islamic Invasion: Confronting the world's fastest growing religion. Eugene, OR: Harvest House, 1992. ISBN 0-89081-983-1.
- The truth about masons. Eugene, OR: Harvest House Publishers, 1993. ISBN 1-56507-077-1.
- Satan's devices. Eugene, OR: Harvest House, 1993. ISBN 0-89081-881-9.
- The moon-god Allah in the archeology of the Middle East. Newport, PA: Research and Education Foundation, 1994.
- Fearing God : the key to the treasure house of heaven. Yorba Linda, CA: Davidson Press, 1999. ISBN 1-891833-52-9.
- An Open Letter to Muslims Orange, CA: Faith Defenders, 2001.
- Muhammad the racist prophet. Orange, CA: Faith Defenders, ca. 2001.
- Who owns the land of Israel? Orange, CA: Faith Defenders, ca. 2001
- Winning the War Against Radical Islam. Christian Scholars Press, 2002. ISBN 1-931230-08-0
- The Encyclopedia of Practical Christianity. Las Vegas, Nev.: Christian Scholars Press, 2003. ISBN 1-931230-11-0
- Is Eastern Orthodoxy Christian? Christian Scholar's Press, 2007. ISBN 1-931230-35-8
- Studies in the Atonement 1989 ISBN 1-931230-04-8
- When Is It Right To Fight. Christian Scholar's Press, 2008. ISBN 1-931230-38-2
- How To Keep Your Kids Drug Free. Christian Scholar's Press, 2008. ISBN 1-931230-37-4
- The Trinity: Evidence and Issues. World Pub, 1996. ISBN 0-529106-92-2
