= Jack Chick =

American cartoonist (1924–2016)

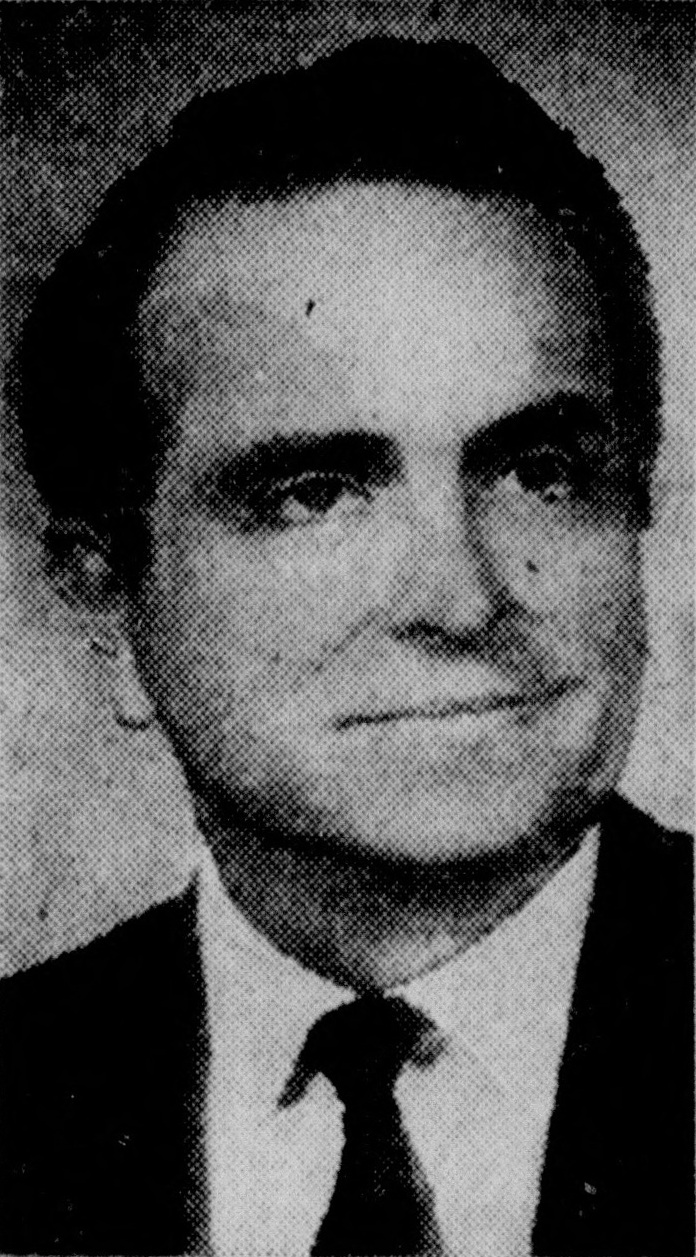
- Chick in 1974
- Born: Jack Thomas Chick; April 13, 1924; Los Angeles, California, U.S.
- Died: October 23, 2016 (aged 92); Alhambra, California, U.S.
- Occupations: Publisher, comic book creator, writer, evangelist
- Known for: Chick tracts
- Spouse(s): Lola Lynn Priddle (m. 1948; died 1998) Susie a.k.a. Susy Chick
- Children: 1
- Military career
- Allegiance: United States
- Branch: U.S. Army
- Rank: Private
- Conflicts: World War II
- Website: chick.com

Jack Thomas Chick (April 13, 1924 – October 23, 2016) was an American cartoonist and publisher, best known for his fundamentalist Baptist "Chick tracts". He expressed his perspective on a variety of issues through sequential-art morality plays.

Many of his tracts accused Roman Catholics, Freemasons, Muslims, and many other groups of murder and conspiracies. His comics have been described by Robert Ito, in Los Angeles magazine, as "equal parts hate literature and fire-and-brimstone sermonizing".

Chick's views have been spread mostly through the tracts and, more recently, online. His company, Chick Publications, says it has sold over 750 million tracts, comic books, videos, books, and posters designed to promote evangelical Protestantism from a fundamentalist perspective. They have been translated into more than 100 languages.

Chick was an Independent Baptist who followed a dispensationalist view of the End Times. He was a believer in the King James Only movement, which posits that every English translation of the Bible other than the King James version is flawed and contains some inaccuracies compared to the original text.

== Biography ==
Chick was born in the neighborhood of Boyle Heights in Los Angeles, and later moved with his family to Alhambra. There Chick was active in the high school drama club. According to Chick, he was not religious in high school. After graduation, he continued his drama education at the Pasadena Playhouse School of Theater on a two-year scholarship.

In February 1943, during World War II, Chick was drafted as a private into the U.S. Army. He served for three years in the Pacific theater, serving in New Guinea, Australia, the Philippines, and Japan working in cryptography. Although he did not see combat, "almost all" of the fellow servicemen he befriended were killed in action, and many of them engaged in activities such as visiting brothels. Chick credited his time overseas for inspiring him to translate his tracts into many different languages and said that he had "a special burden for missions and missionaries".

After the war, he returned to the Pasadena Playhouse, where he met his future wife while working on a production there. Lola Lynn Priddle (1926–1998), a Canadian immigrant, came from a very religious family, and Chick said that she was "instrumental in his salvation". Priddle and her parents introduced Chick to the Charles E. Fuller radio show The Old-Fashioned Revival Hour, and Chick said that he was converted while listening to an episode of this show.

Chick and Priddle married in 1948. They had one child, a daughter named Carol, who died in 2001. (Note: According to an article in The Guardian, their daughter died in 1998. According to other sources cited in the article, this is the year Chick's wife, Lola Lynn, died, with their daughter dying in 2001.) Lola Lynn died in February 1998. The widower Chick remarried to an Asian woman whose name has been variously reported as Susie and Susy.

In a 2005 issue of his company's newsletter, Battle Cry, Chick reported that he had a life-threatening health emergency sometime between 2003 and 2005. He said, "My flu turned into pneumonia, my blood sugar dropped to 20 (I am diabetic)... I was going into a coma. My wife called 911 and while they were on the way, I had a heart attack. A day or so later I had to undergo a triple bypass."

Chick had limited personal contact with the public; he gave only one known professional interview after 1975. The lack of available public information about him created some speculation that he was a pen name for unnamed authors. Chick died in his sleep at age 92. His body was discovered on the evening of October 23, 2016, in his home at Alhambra, California. The interment was private.

In the wake of Jack Chick's death, a biography, You Don't Know Jack: The Authorized Biography of Christian Cartoonist Jack T. Chick by David W. Daniels, was published by Chick Publications in 2017. The book contains a number of previously unpublished photographs of Chick.

== Career ==
From 1953 to 1955, Chick drew a single-panel cartoon, whose text was written by P. S. Clayton, titled Times Have Changed? It thematically resembled the B.C. comic strip and The Flintstones animated cartoon, but predated both. These were syndicated by the Mirror Enterprises Co. in Los Angeles area newspapers.

After converting to Christianity, Chick wanted to evangelize others, but he was too shy to talk to people directly about religion. Chick heard from missionary Bob Hammond, who had broadcast in Asia on the Voice of America, that the Chinese Communist Party had gained significant influence among ordinary Chinese in the 1950s through the distribution of palm-size sequential picture books known as lianhuanhua. Chick also began working with a prison ministry and created a flip chart of illustrations to use with his presentation. He hit upon the idea of creating witnessing tracts, which could be given to people directly or indirectly.

While working for the AstroScience Corporation (a maker of tape recorders and avionics for the U.S. government) in El Monte, California, he self-published his first tract, Why No Revival? in 1960. He paid for it with a loan from his credit union. He published his second tract, A Demon's Nightmare, in 1962. He decided to create more tracts and began "using his kitchen table as an office and art studio". Christian bookstores were reluctant to accept the tracts, but they were popular among missionaries and churches.

He officially established Chick Publications in 1970 in Rancho Cucamonga, California. Initially, Chick wrote and illustrated all of the comics himself, but in 1972 he hired another artist to illustrate many of the tracts. Fred Carter illustrated tracts anonymously until 1980, when he was identified in an issue of Chick's newsletter Battle Cry. Carter also painted the oil paintings seen in The Light of the World, a film Chick produced that related the Christian gospel.

=== Chick Publications ===
This Was Your Life! is a Chick tract that was translated into over 100 languages. Chick Publications described it as its most popular title.

Chick Publications also distributes "Chick tracts", small comic tracts with religious messages. Those which are still in print or are available for order can be viewed in their entirety on the company's website. The most popular Chick tract is "This Was Your Life!". It has been translated into around 100 languages, and many other tracts are available in widely spoken languages such as Arabic, German, Spanish, and Tagalog. Several of Chick's tracts have been translated into less widely-spoken languages as Blue Hmong, Huichol, Ngiemboon, Tshiluba, and the constructed language of Esperanto.

In addition to tracts, Chick Publications released at least 24 full-size "Chick comics" since its founding. They are full-color comic books, and most were first published between 1974 and 1985. The first 22 form The Crusaders series, which follows the stories of two fundamentalist Christians and addresses topics such as the occult, Bible prophecy, and the theory of evolution; six prominently feature the life story of Alberto Rivera, a purported "former Jesuit priest" whose story has been widely discredited, even by those who might otherwise agree with Chick's anti-Catholic views.

== Themes ==
Chick was known for his conspiratorial views and his belief that secret groups, such as the Illuminati, exert influence on the world to advance evil. In "The Broken Cross," Chick introduces John Todd, a former grand druid priest who claims that secret groups, including witches and the Illuminati, are working to advance evil. Chick's version of Christianity emphasizes the role of Satan and his minions, portraying them as the principal evils in his comic. He sees Satan as the one behind all major events, including biblical occurrences like Adam and Eve and the Great Flood, as part of his ongoing battle for control. In this worldview, God's actions are seen as reactions to the Devil's actions, creating a dynamic game between the two sides for the fate of humanity.

Some scholars, such as Jason C. Bivins, have identified Chick with the new Christian right due to areas of theological overlap with figures in the movement such as Tim LaHaye or Jerry Falwell: in particular, their views on eschatology and biblical inerrancy. Nathan Saunders, however, argues that Chick's beliefs about Roman Catholicism as a demonic, false gospel separate him from the group, which included a number of Catholics such as Phyllis Schlafly and Paul Weyrich. "Chick consequently refused to follow his fellow fundamentalists when they compromised doctrinal purity by making a pact with the Devil. Doctrinal compromise rendered the [new Christian right] at best ineffective and at worst satanic."

Catholic Answers has called Chick "savagely anti-Catholic", describes Chick's statements about the Catholic Church as "bizarre" and "often grotesque in their arguments", and calls for the tracts to be pulled from the market and corrected. In the early 1980s, Chick's stance on Catholicism led some Christian bookstores to stop stocking his tracts, and he withdrew from the Christian Booksellers Association after the association considered expelling him. Christianity Today described Chick as an example of "the world of ordinary, nonlearned evangelicals", for whom "atavistic anti-Catholicism remains as colorful and unmistakable as ever". Michael Ian Borer, a sociology professor of Furman University at the time, showed Chick's strong anti-Catholic themes in a 2007 American Sociological Association presentation and in a peer-reviewed article the next year in Religion and American Culture. Chick responded to these accusations by saying that he was opposed to the Roman Catholic Church as a sociopolitical organization, but not to its individual members. On his "Roman Catholicism FAQ", Chick said he began publishing his theories about the Roman Catholic Church because "he loves Catholics and wants them to be saved through faith in Jesus". Six of Chick's full-size comics feature Alberto Rivera, specifically: Alberto, Double Cross, The Godfathers, The Force, Four Horsemen, and The Prophet. Rivera was an anti-Catholic religious activist who claimed to have been a Jesuit priest before becoming a fundamentalist Protestant. Rivera was the source of many of the conspiracy theories about the Vatican and the Jesuits espoused by Jack Chick.

Wiccan author Kerr Cuhulain has described Chick and his theories as being "anti-feminist" and "anti-Pagan", noted that a Chick Publications comic book was the source of a Rapid City, South Dakota police detective's presentation on the history of Satanism given in 1989, and describes him as "easily the least reputable source of reliable information on religious groups".
