= Jenifa (film series) =

Comedy film franchise

- Created by: Funke Akindele
- Original work: Jenifa (2008)
- Owner: FAAN
- Years: 2008–present

Films and television
- Films: Main series: Jenifa (2008); The Return of Jenifa (2011); Everybody Loves Jenifa (2024); Prequel series: Aiyetoro Town (2018)
- Web series: Jenifa on Lockdown
- Television special: Jenifa’s Diary (2015)

Audio
- Soundtracks: Everybody Loves Christmas Jenifa Riddim Moon & Back Aiyetoro Anthem

Jenifa is a Nigerian comedy-drama media franchise based on the fictional character created by Funke Akindele. The series is mainly produced by Akindele, who plays Jenifa, a young woman from a rural village who relocates to the city.

Starting in 2008, the series focuses on Jenifa's character and, like the television series' structure, is complemented by an ensemble cast, such as Adaku (played by Omotunde Adebowale) and Shege (played by Folarin Falana), who have recurring roles.

The series is ranked among the highest-grossing Nigerian film franchises, earning over ₦3 billion worldwide. The third film, subtitled Everybody Loves Jenifa, was released on December 13, 2024, and is currently the series' highest-grossing entry. The films are co-produced by FAAN and released by Filmone Distribution.

== Films and series ==
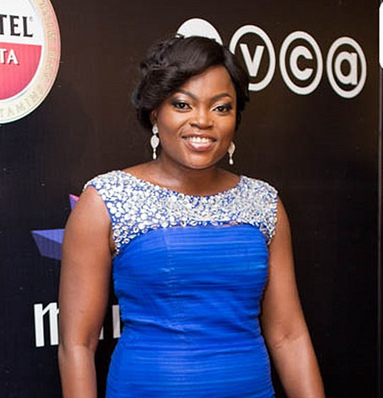
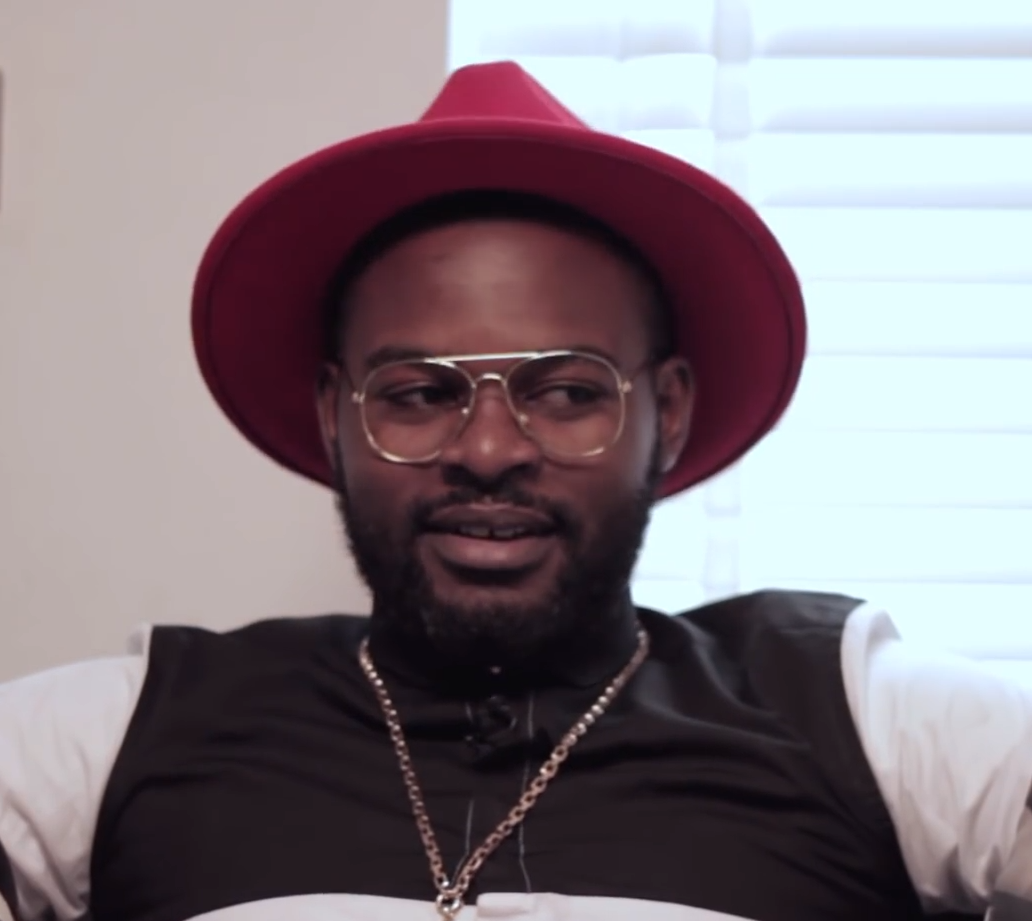
Funke Akindele, Falz, and Omotunde Adebowale reprised their roles in more than 3 films.

Film/ Series	Release date	Director	Screenwriter(s)	Story by	Producers	Status
Jenifa (2008)	2008	Muhydeen S. Ayinde	Sharafadeen Olabode, Adebayo Sodiq, Funke Akindele & Muhydeen S. Ayinde	Funke Akindele	Olatunji Balogun & Funke Akindele	Released
The Return of Jenifa	October 7, 2011	Muhydeen S. Ayinde	Adebayo Sodiq	Funke Akindele	Olatunji Balogun & Funke Akindele	Released
Aiyetoro Town	June 21, 2019	JJC Skillz, Saheed Bolaji, Tobi Makinde & Kunle Akindele	Yinka Adebayo & Funke Akindele	Funke Akindele	Funke Akindele & Abdulrasheed Bello	Released
Jenifa’s Diary	April 15, 2015	JJC Skillz & Tunde Olaoye	Funke Akindele, Leo Ugochukwu, Mazi Akinola, Abayomi Alvin & Tunde Olaoye	Funke Akindele	Funke Akindele	Released
Jenifa on Lockdown	May 13, 2021	JJC Skillz	-	Funke Akindele	Funke Akindele	Released
Everybody Loves Jenifa	December 13, 2024	Tunde Olaoye & Funke Akindele	Akinlabi Ishola, Collins Okoh & Funke Akindele	Funke Akindele	Funke Akindele	Released

Film releases timeline
2008	Jenifa
2009
2010
2011	The Return of Jenifa
2012
2013
2014
2015	Jenifa's Diary
2016
2017
2018
2019	Aiyetoro Town
2020
2021	Jenifa on Lockdown
2022
2023
2024	Everybody Loves Jenifa

=== Jenifa (2008) ===
In the first film of the series, Jenifa (Suliat), a young woman from the village of Ayetoro who wants a glamorous life, gains admission to a university. She finds campus life too fast for her and struggles to keep up. Pressured by her friends to follow the crowd, she tries to find out who she really is.

=== The Return of Jenifa (2011) ===
Fresh from her reign on the social scene, Jenifa faces the consequences of her past excesses when she is required to take an HIV test to enter a dancing competition. Unsure of her status, she flees, and her own evasiveness becomes her biggest enemy. To escape the pressure, she retreats to her village, where she learns that life is not about being a "Gbogbo Big Girl" without values. The film was dedicated to the memory of the late comedian CD John.

=== Aiyetoro Town (2019) ===
In the third installment, Baale Oyeniyi (Femi Branch), who has lived in Edinburgh, sets out to turn the village of Aiyetoro into a town without losing its customs and traditions. He hires National Youth Service Corps members to teach the villagers English, but he has to deal with a group of troublesome youths led by Jenifa’s brother, Waheed. His half brother, Prince Oyekunle (Deyemi Okanlawon), comes back from the United States claiming the Baale stole his throne. Meanwhile his uncle, the corrupt Baale of Aiyedogbon (Dele Odule), threatens him after a manufacturing company drops a land deal in Aiyedogbon and buys land in Aiyetoro instead.

=== Jenifa on Lockdown (2021) ===
The series is also the spin off of Jenifa's Diary, that centers on character's reactions to the global COVID-19. It delves into health care and local government criticism, along with other social issues and commentary.

=== Everybody Loves Jenifa (2024) ===
Film promotional title card

In the sixth film, Jenifa is praised across Amen Estate after rescuing a child from a burning house, and she turns her attention to her foundation, which trains people in vocational skills with help from trainers like Hilda Baci and Veekee James. Her place as the community’s favourite is threatened when a wealthy new neighbour, Lobster, moves in, and she later sees him beat his wife, Olivia, into a coma. Teaming up with the women’s rights activist Madam Bassey, Jenifa sets out to bring him to justice, but Lobster’s threats force her and her friends to flee to Ghana, where they uncover a drug cartel led by Bebe.

=== Everybody Loves Christmas (2024) ===
This holiday-themed film features Jenifa and an ensemble cast, including notable Nigerian entertainers such as D'banj and Falz.

=== Spin-offs and Legacy ===
==== Jenifa’s Diary ====
The television series follows the ongoing adventures of Jenifa, focusing on her career, relationships, and interactions with a variety of characters. The series has received several accolades, including awards at the Africa Magic Viewers' Choice Awards.

== Recurring cast and characters ==
List indicators

This section includes characters who will appear or have appeared in the Jenifa film series.

- An empty grey cell indicates the character was not in the film, or that the character's official presence has not yet been confirmed.
- ^{C} indicates a cameo role.
- ^{P} indicates an appearance in onscreen photographs.

Character	Main films			Spin-off films		
Character	Jenifa	The Return of Jenifa	Everybody Loves Jenifa	Jenifa’s Diary	Aiyetoro Town	Jenifa on Lockdown
Jenifa	Funke Akindele	Funke Akindele	Funke Akindele	Funke Akindele	Funke Akindele	Funke Akindele
Adaku			Omotunde Adebowale	Omotunde Adebowale	Omotunde Adebowale	Omotunde Adebowale
Shege			Folarin Falana	Folarin Falana		
Kiki				Lota Chukwu		
Toyosi			Juliana Olayode	Juliana Olayode		
Esther				Aderounmu Adejumoke		
Timini			Tobi Makinde	Tobi Makinde	Tobi Makinde	Tobi Makinde
Marcus				JJC Skillz		
Rex			Layi Wasabi			
Waheed	Tope Adebayo	Tope Adebayo		Tope Adebayo	Tope Adebayo	Tope Adebayo
Baba Suliat	Kayode Olaiya	Kayode Olaiya		Kayode Olaiya	Kayode Olaiya	Kayode Olaiya
Iya Suliat	Tola Oladokun	Tola Oladokun		Tola Oladokun	Tola Oladokun	Tola Oladokun
Shaki	Ireti Osayemi	Ireti Osayemi			Ireti Osayemi	
Jolade	Eniola Badmus	Eniola Badmus				
Kola	Odunlade Adekola					
Chief Gbade	Alade Adeshina					
Brummel		Peju Balogun	Peju Balogun			
Guest Artiste		ELDee	ELDee			
Criss Cross		Omawumi	Omawumi			

== Additional crew and production details ==
Film	Crew/detail					
Film	Composer(s)	Cinematographer(s)	Editor(s)	Production companies	Distributing companies	Running time
Jenifa	Fatai Izebe	Moroof Fadairo	Abiodun Adeoye	Scene One Productions & Olasco Films	Olasco Films and Records	1 hr 41 mins
The Return of Jenifa	-	Adetokunbo Odubawo & D.J. Tee	-	Scene One Productions & Olasco Films	Olasco Films and Records	2h 52 mins
Aiyetoro Town (Web series)	Akande Abdullahi & Shola Awokponle	Ganiu Anifowose	Oladele Rasheed	Scene One Productions & Funke Ayotunde Akindele Network (FAAN)	YouTube	(22 episodes)
Jenifa on Lockdown (Web series)	Puffytee			SceneOne Productions & Funke Akindele Ayotunde Network (FAAN)	YouTube	(9 episodes)
Jenifa’s Diary (TV series)	Topage Ejay & Stephanie	Blessing Adejumo	Akindele Akinkunle, Kehinde Bello, Ilemobola Damilare, Njoku Emejeezy, Oyekan Lukmon, and Abiodun Segun	Scene One Productions & Funke Ayotunde Akindele Network (FAAN).	Flixscreen & Africa Independent Television,Paulo International Concepts	43 hrs 733 mins (105 episodes)
Everybody Loves Jenifa	Tolu Obanro	John Njaga Demps	Valentine Chukwuma	Funke Ayotunde Akindele Network (FAAN)	FilmOne Distributions & Nile Entertainment	2 hours

== Reception ==
Box-office performance off Jenifa films
Film	Release date	Box-office gross	
Film	Release date	Domestic	International
Jenifa (2008)	2008	₦TBA	₦TBA
The Return of Jenifa	October 7, 2011	₦35,000,000	₦TBA
Aiyetoro Town	June 21, 2019	₦TBA	₦TBA
Jenifa’s Diary	April 15, 2015	₦TBA	₦TBA
Jenifa on Lockdown	2021	₦TBA	₦TBA
Everybody Loves Jenifa	December 13, 2024	₦1,466,091,220	$100,000
Total		₦1,574,091,220	$100,000

== Music ==
=== Singles ===
Title	U.S. release date	Length	Artist(s)	Label	Film
"Everybody Loves Christma"	December 19, 2024	5:22	Cast of Everybody Loves Jenifa featuring Funke Akindele, Falz, Bisola Aiyeola, and D'Banj	FAAN	Everybody Loves Jenifa
