= Jenifa on Lockdown =

Nigerian television comedy series created by Funke Akindele

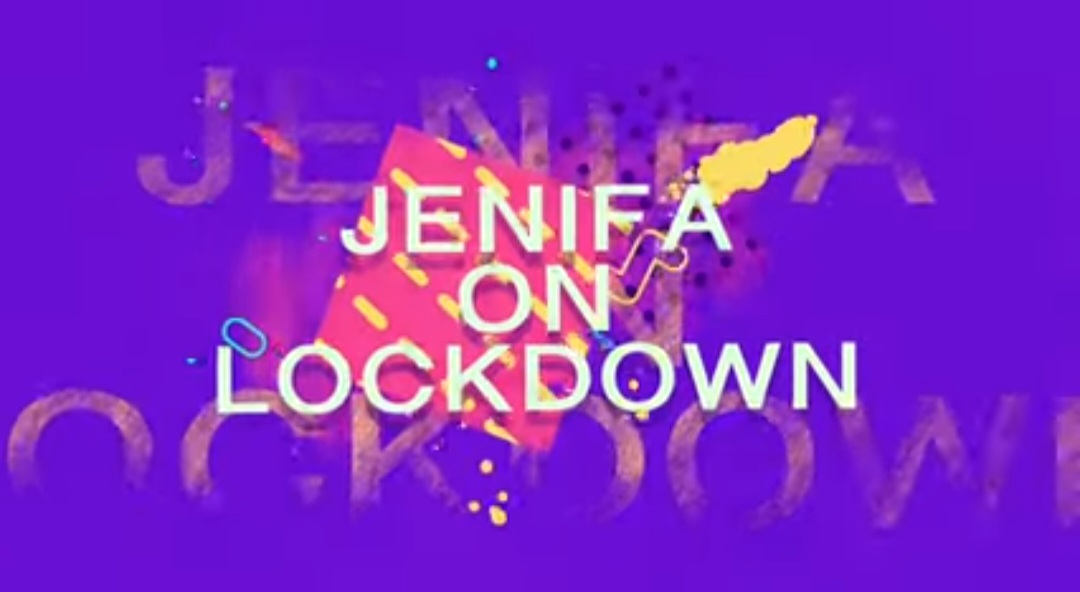
- Genre: Sitcom
- Created by: Funke Akindele
- Based on: Jenifa characters
- Screenplay by: Funke Akindele
- Story by: Funke Akindele
- Directed by: JJC Skillz
- Starring: Funke Akindele; Tope Adebayo; Tola Oladokun; Kayode Olaiya; Jumoke Odetola; Mustahpa Sholagbade; Tobi Makinde; Omotunde Adebowale; Michael Uba; Paschaline Alex Okoli; Gilbert Gotar Augustine; Wendy Chisom
- Music by: Puffytee
- Country of origin: Nigeria
- Original languages: English, Yoruba, Igbo, Hausa and Nigerian Pidgin
- No. of seasons: 1
- No. of episodes: 9

Production
- Producer: Funke Akindele
- Running time: 20 - 30 minutes
- Production companies: Scene One Productions; Funke Akindele Ayotunde Network (FAAN)

Original release
- Network: YouTube
- Release: May 13, 2021

Jenifa on Lockdown is a 2021 Nigerian comedy series. It is a spin-off of Jenifa's Diary, that follows characters' reactions to global COVID-19 pandemic lockdown. The series is part of the Jenifa franchise, based on a naive and funny character of the same name.

The series join the growing list of the Jenifa franchise succeeding Aiyetoro Town, produced independently under SceneOne Productions(now FAAN).

== Premise ==
The series addressed themes such as healthcare challenges, local government criticism, and broader social issues, using Jenifa's signature comedic and satirical approach.

== Cast ==
- Funke Akindele as Jenifa
- Tope Adebayo as Waheed
- Tola Oladokun as Mama Jenifa
- Kayode Olaiya as Baba Jenifa
- Jumoke Odetola
- Mustahpa Sholagbade
- Tobi Makinde as Timini
- Omotunde Adebowale as Adaku
- Paschaline Alex Okoli as Cordeila
- Michael Uba as James
- Gilbert Gotar Augustine as Hassan
- Wendy Chisom as Paupau
