= Michael Uba =

Nigerian actor

- Born: Ogwashi-Uku, Delta State
- Other name: Ogbolor
- Citizenship: Nigerian
- Occupations: Actor, comedian, master of ceremonies and radio personality
- Notable work: Jenifa's Diary as James

Michael Uba, popularly known as Ogbolor, is a Nigerian actor, comedian, master of ceremonies and radio personality. He is known for his role as James in the Nigerian TV series Jenifa's Diary, created by Funke Akindele.

He attended Federal Government College Ibillo from 1995 to 2000.

== Early life and career ==
Michael is from Ogwashi-Uku in Delta State, Nigeria. His career began in the entertainment industry as a dancer. But he later shifted his focus to acting and comedy. His breakthrough role came with Jenifa's Diary, where he played James. He has played roles in several Nollywood films including Hell Ride (2022), Just Us Girls (2023), Tuesday the 14th (2021). Besides acting, Michael is known for his work as a comedian and an on-air personality for Wazobia FM.

== Filmography ==
- Jenifa's Diary as James
- Jenifa on Lockdown (2021) as James
