= Jenifa's Diary =

Nigerian television comedy series created by Funke Akindele-Bello

- Genre: Sitcom
- Created by: Funke Akindele
- Based on: Jenifa
- Screenplay by: Funke Akindele
- Story by: Funke Akindele
- Directed by: JJC Skillz; Tunde Olaoye
- Starring: Funke Akindele; Falz; Juliana Olayode; Lota Chukwu; Tobi Makinde; Lolo
- Music by: Topage
- Country of origin: Nigeria
- Original languages: English, Yoruba, Igbo, Hausa and Nigerian Pidgin
- No. of seasons: 28
- No. of episodes: 292

Production
- Producer: Funke Akindele
- Running time: 20 - 30 minutes
- Production companies: Scene One Productions; Funke Akindele Ayotunde Network (FAAN)

Original release
- Network: Africa Independent Television
- Release: April 15, 2015

Jenifa's Diary is a Nigerian television comedy series, created by Funke Akindele. The series is part of the Jenifa franchise, based on a naive and funny character of the same name. Jenifa's Diary has 28 seasons and as of 2017 was ongoing.

== Premise ==
Jenifa’s utterances contain both ‘direct’ and ‘indirect’ speech acts. The series tells the story of a native village girl Jenifa (played by Funke Akindele) who desperately wants to get out of her ratchet way of life. In her desperation, she leaves her village and goes to the city of Lagos in order to get a proper education. Toyosi, an old friend is left with no choice than to accommodate her despite the visit being unannounced.

Jenifa is unsuccessful with her education but she gets a job at Nikki'o salon on the Island with the help of her friend Kiki, becoming very successful in her hairstyling career.

At Nikki'o salon, she meets another stylist, Segun (played by Folarin 'Falz' Falana), who becomes romantically interested in her. Jenifa resists all his advances citing that she would like to be in a relationship with someone who is above her in status and education. Later Jenifa learns of his plan to visit the United States. He tells her he had been trying to tell her of his intentions and even help her travel out of Nigeria too. With Segun gone, work at Nikki'o salon resumes.

In the premiere episode of season 5, Jenifa meets Marcus, a wealthy businessman. Marcus employs her as a manager in his new salon. Jenifa asks Toyosi to write a resignation letter since she would be leaving Nikki'O. One day, Marcus's wife, Tiana, appears out of the blues. Marcus never told Jenifa of his marital life. When Jenifa along with Adaku and Benny who left Nikki'O with Jenifa in search of greener pastures could not stand Tiana again, they decide to flee back to Nikki'O. Unbeknownst to Jenifa, Adaku and Benny had written a letter for excuse to be away for a while instead of resignation. Jenifa left with no choice goes back to Nikki'O to beg Randy, the manager to employ her back. To her surprise, she is welcomed back with open arms with the news that her demands have been met and her salary has been increased as she asked. Instead of writing a letter of resignation, Toyosi had written a letter for salary increment instead. Jenifa resumes work at Nikki'O. One day, the CEO of Nikki'O called a meeting and had Jenifa, Adaku and Benny fired for their dishonesty. The informant who had spilled the beans is revealed to be Pelumi, Jenifa’s rival and a hairstylist at Nikki'O.

== Cast ==
- Funke Akindele as Jenifa
- Folarin "Falz" Falana as Segun
- Lolo as Adaku
- Juliana Olayode as Toyosi
- Lota Chukwu as Kiki
- Paschaline Alex Okoli as Cordelia
- Aderounmu Adejumoke as Esther
- Michael Uba as James
- Jide Awobona as Sam
- JJC Skillz as Marcus
- Tobi Makinde as Timini
- Jerry Smart Ordu as Randy
- Tope Adebayo as Waheed, Jenifa's younger brother
- Chukwuebuka Anyaduba as Chima
- Tomike Adeoye As Tania
- Joy Nice as Pelumi, the main antagonist and Jenifa's rival.
- Tiwa Savage as herself (cameo appearance).
- Nosa Rex as Terwase

== Spin-off ==
A spin-off called Aiyetoro Town premiered on 21 June 2019. It consisted of 18 episodes and was released exclusively on YouTube. It is set in the Jenifa's village, the fictional Aiyetoro Town which just got transformed to a town. It stars Funke Akindele retaining her role as Jenifa and some of her costars from Jenifa's Diary such as Tope Adebayo as Waheed (Jenifa's younger brother), Tobi Makinde as Timini with Femi Branch, Deyemi Okanlawon, Nkechi Blessing, Ireti Osayemi, Funmi Awelewa, Ether Kalejaiye and others joining the cast.

A new spin-off was made called Jenifa on Lockdown premiered on 13 May 2021. It's an ongoing series and was released YouTube. It is also set in Aiyetoro Town and Jenifa's hair place. It stars Funke Akindele as Jenifa, with Paschaline Alex Okoli, Tope Adebayo, Tobi Makinde reprising their roles respectively, with Mustapha Sholagbade, and Jumoke Odetola.
