= Everybody Loves Christmas =

2024 Nigerian Christmas-themed single

Promotional single by Cast of Everybody Loves Jenifa featuring Funke Akindele, Falz, Bisola Aiyeola, and D'Banj
- Released: 19 December 2024
- Recorded: 2024
- Genre: Christmas song
- Length: 5:22
- Label: FAAN
- Songwriters: Falz; D'Banj; Waje; Bisola
- Producer: Cobhams Asuquo

Music video
- "Everybody Loves Christmas" on YouTube

Everybody Loves Christmas is a Nigerian Christmas-themed film special featuring a star-studded cast, including Nigerian musician D'banj, rapper and actor Falz, and the ensemble from the film Everybody Loves Jenifa.

== Background ==
The special features the original Christmas soundtrack, with appearances by D'banj, Falz and other cast members. The song was produced by Cobhams Asuquo. And released ahead of the film's December 2024 theatrical premiere. The five-minute video features several cast members, including Falz, Layi Wasabi, Dbanj, Patience Ozokwor, Chimezie Imo, Tope Tedela, Omotunde Adebowale-David, Bisola Aiyeola, Jide Kosoko, Omowunmi Dada, Juliana Olayode, Nancy Isime, and Waje.

== Release history ==
Release history and formats for Everybody Loves Christmas (Original Theme Song)
Region	Date	Format(s)	Editions(s)	Label(s)	Ref.
Various	4 December 2024	Digital download; streaming; CD	Standard	FAAN	
