= Aiyetoro Town =

Nigerian television comedy series created by Funke Akindele

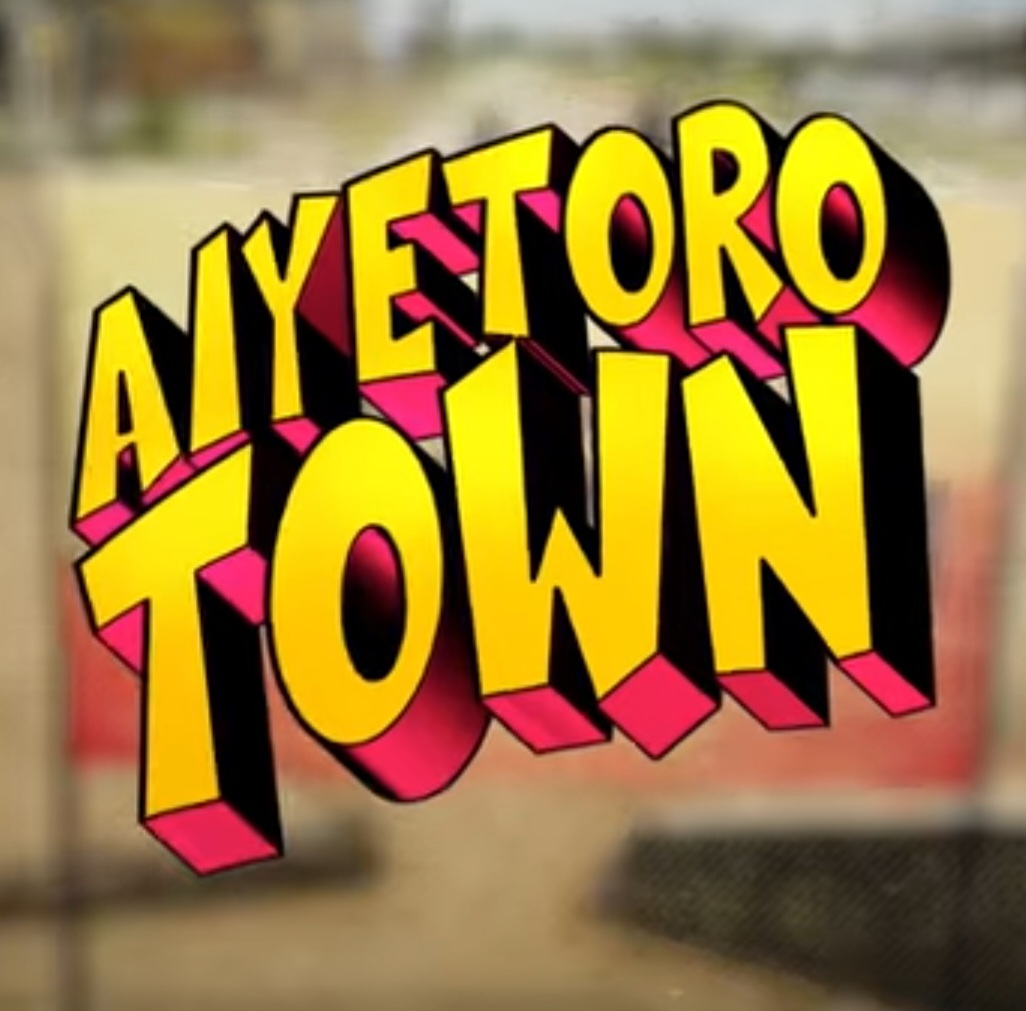
- Title card
- Genre: Sitcom
- Created by: Funke Akindele
- Based on: Jenifa characters
- Screenplay by: Funke Akindele
- Story by: Funke Akindele
- Directed by: JJC Skillz; Saheed Abolaji; Tobi Makinde; Kunle Akindele
- Starring: Funke Akindele; Femi Branch; Tope Adebayo; Motunrayo Adegboye; Doyin Fagbohun; Samuel Perry 'Broda Shaggi'; Nkechi Blessing; Carmilos Orji Ibe; Ayanfe Adekunle; Tobi Makinde; Esther Kalejaiye; Funmi Awelewa; Efe Ohora; Deyemi Okanlawon; Ireti Osayemi; Dele Odule
- Music by: Toopage; Tolu Obanro
- Country of origin: Nigeria
- Original languages: English, Yoruba, Igbo, Hausa and Nigerian Pidgin
- No. of seasons: 2
- No. of episodes: 24

Production
- Producer: Funke Akindele
- Running time: 20 - 40 minutes
- Production companies: SceneOne Productions; Funke Akindele Ayotunde Network (FAAN)

Original release
- Network: YouTube
- Release: June 21, 2019

Aiyetoro Town is a 2019 Nigerian comedy series. A spin-off of Jenifa's Diary, it centers on Jenifa's hometown and it's dwellers. The first season is a collaboration between FAAN (formerly SceneOne Productions) and YouTube.

The series marked the return of Ireti Osayemi's character, Shakky, from the original films and Jenifa's old arch-enemy, to the franchise since The Return of Jenifa, with several Jenifa's Diary cast making special appearances.

== Premise ==
Aiyetoro Town explores the journey of development, cultural preservation, and the clash between modernity and tradition in a rural Nigerian setting.

== Cast ==
- Femi Branch as Baale (season 1; guest season 2)
- Tope Adebayo as Waheed (season 1)
- Alade Adebukola as Risi
- Motunrayo Adegboye as Laide
- Ayanfe Adekunle as Adigun (season 1)
- Olulade Adeniyi as Kola
- Prince Adewale Adeyemo as Otun
- Funke Akindele as Jenifa
- Fisayo Akinnibosun as Baale's guard
- John Atura as Orji
- Nkechi Blessing as Mama Chichi
- Deyemi Okanlawon as Kabiyesi Oyetunde (guest series 1; series 2)
- Abati Adeotan Abidemi as Kings Hypeman (season 2)
- Timilehin Ibitoye as Baale's guard
- Tobi Makinde as Timini

Supporting

- Sola Sobowale as New Iyalode (season 2)
- Samuel Perry as Bayonle
- Mercy Aigbe as Site Supervisor (season 2)
- Esther Kalejaiye as Amope (season 1)
- Funmi Awelewa as Yewande (season 1)
- Efe Ohora as Baale's wife

== Plot ==
Baale of Aiyetoro town, who having lived in Edinburgh and having been influenced by Western civilization comes back to Aiyetoro with the goal of making the village a modern town while still maintaining its traditions, culture, and values.

He faceses challenges because of the resistance that he faced from the people who are not ready for change. Other challenges include the mischief of the brother of Jenifa and his friends, as well as the mischievous acts of Laide and the other youth, which cause trouble within the town. Such activities prove to be very difficult for the Baale and other leaders in the town.

== Episodes ==
Series	Episodes	Originally released
1	24	21 June 2019
2	28	22 June 2025

== Reception ==
Segun Odejimi of TNS reviewed the series, examining its comedic style, characterisation and exploration of social issues within the fictional community of Aiyetoro Town. Odejimi also discussed the series' connection to the ''Jenifa's Diary franchise". Daniel Okechukwu of Culture Custodian reviewed the first four episodes of the first season, describing the series as a comedy that divided opinion through its use of humour and character-driven storytelling. Okechukwu highlighted the show's comedic style, performances and portrayal of life in the fictional community, noting both its entertaining moments and aspects that some viewers might find excessive.
