= Nosa Rex =

Nigerian film actor and producer

- Born: Nosa Rex Okunzuwa; Benin City, Edo State
- Other name: Baba Rex
- Education: Ambrose Alli University
- Occupations: Actor, comedian, movie producer, content creator
- Years active: 2010–present
- Notable work: Jenifa's Diary
- Children: 2

Nosa Rex Okunzuwa, known by his stage name Nosa Rex and also as Baba Rex, is a Nigerian film and TV actor and film producer.

== Early life and education ==
Nosa Rex Okunzuwa was born in Benin City, Edo State, and earned a bachelor's degree in Mechanical Engineering from the Ambrose Alli University in Ekpoma in 2009.

== Film career ==
He started working as an actor in 2010 after completing his national service. His first movie appearance was in Gazza Treasure by Derek Osonwa. In addition to film work, he played Terwase in the TV series Jenifa's Diary created by Funke Akindele.

=== Production ===
He is CEO of the film production house Big Things Development.

=== Other work ===
Okunzuwa also has a clothing line and is an automobile dealer. He also assists his wife with her food business. In 2020 he became a brand ambassador for the aphrodisiac Mydsiac.

== Personal life ==
Okunzuwa married Deborah Raphael Nwokocha on 22 August 2015 and they have a daughter and a son.

== Filmography ==
- Gazza Treasure (2010)
- Princess Natasha (2015) as Nelson
- Joy of Natasha (2015) as Nelson
- Agwonma (2015)
- Drum of Death (2016)
- My Best Friends Wedding (2016) as Jeff
- Rise of the Titan (2017)
- Omuwa (2017)
- Eyes of the Kingdom (2017)
- My Love and I (2017)
- My Own Sweat (2017)
- Nneka my Princess (2017)
- The Road Not Taken (2017)
- Perfect (2017) as Elvis
- My Only Inheritance (2017)
- Help that Kill (2017)
- God of Elijah (2017)
- We Meet Again (2017) as Temi
- Bread of Sorrow (2017)
- Caro, the Iron Bender (2017)
- Lagos Real Fake Life (2018) as Obi
- Inherited Cursed (2018)
- Feel My Heart (2018)
- Pains of Royalty (2018)
- The Right Time (2018)
- A Fight to Live 1 (2018)
- Not My Throne (2018)
- Unknown Damage (2018)
- Wrong Choice (2018)
- Evil Mindset (2018)
- Strength of Love (2018)
- Odida Kingdom (2018)
- Onitsha Housewife (2018)
- Tears of Vengeance (2018)
- Family Commander (2018)
- Dooshima' (2018)
- Onaedo Kingdom (2018)
- The Mortal Bride (2019)
- In Love with my Family Cook (2019)
- Royal Ambition (2019)
- Oath from Birth (2019)
- Your Dream Girl (2019) as Dozie
- Royal Sin (2019)
- Family Deliverance (2019)
- Tears of a Super Rich Bachelor (2019)
- Sacred Twist (2019)
- Rags to Robe (2019)
- Omo Ghetto: The Saga (2020) as Efe Money
- Maduka Daughters (2020)
- Love Upon the Hills (2020)
- Crisis in London (2020)
- Breaking Chains (2020)
- The Hostage (2020)
- Family Business (2020)
- The Broken King (2020)
- Agony of a Widow (2020)
- The Signs of Misfortune (2020)
- The Prisoners (2020)
- The Brothers (2020)
- Greater Than Love (2020)
- Our Lying Husbands (2020)
- The Living Deity (2020) as Prince Obieze
- Her Bride Price (2020)
- Kiss of Betrayal (2020)
- Priority of Love (2020)
- Quarantine Husbands (2020)
- Sugar Babies (2020) as Alex
- Please Marry Me (2020) as Ramos
- Ebere's Ordeal (2020) as Chiemela
- Nosa, The Preacher Man (2020)
- Professional Chefs (2020)
- Seasonal Love (2021)
- Who Would Be My Chosen Bride (2021)
- From Prince to a Local Driver (2021)
- The Gatekeeper and the Beautiful Ghost (2021)
- Nosa. the Village Town Crier (2021)
- From Prince to a Local Driver (2021)
- The Wildflower (2022) as Igwe
- Blood Pressure (2022) as Dino
- Gbege (2022)
- The Man for the Job (2022) as Topboy
- A Tribe Called Judah (2023) as Jerry
- Bad And Sweet (2026)

=== Television series ===
- Jenifa's Diary (2015) as Terwase
- From Poor to Billionaire (2021)
- Benefit Boys (2021)

== Awards ==
| Year | Award | Category | Result | Ref |
|---|---|---|---|---|
| 2013 | City People Entertainment Awards | Best New Actor of the Year | Won | |
| 2017 | City People Movie Awards | Best Upcoming Actor of the Year | Nominated | |
| 2018 | City People Movie Awards | Best Upcoming Actor of the Year | Nominated | |

== See also ==
- List of Nigerian actors
