= Everybody Loves Jenifa =

2024 Nigerian film

- Directed by: Funke Akindele; Tunde Laoye
- Written by: Funke Akindele; Collins Okoh; Akinlabi Ishola
- Story by: Funke Akindele
- Produced by: Funke Akindele; Wendy Uwadiae Imasuen; Olayemi Oshodi
- Starring: Funke Akindele; Falz; Nancy Isime; Stan Nze; Jackie Appiah; Juliana Olayode
- Cinematography: John Njaga Demps
- Edited by: Valentine Chukwuma
- Music by: Tolu Obanro
- Production company: Funke Ayotunde Akindele Network (FAAN)
- Distributed by: FilmOne Distributions; Nile Entertainment
- Release date: 13 December 2024
- Running time: 120 minutes
- Countries: Nigeria, Ghana
- Languages: English, Yoruba, Igbo, Hausa, Nigeria Pidgin

Everybody Loves Jenifa is a 2024 Nigerian comedy drama film directed by Funke Akindele, Tunde Olaoye and produced by Funke Ayotunde Akindele Network and Olayemi Oshodi. Starring Akindele, Nancy Isime, Stan Nze, Lateef Adedimeji, Falz, Layi Wasabi, Jackie Appiah, Omowumi Dada, Chimezie Imo, Tope Tedela and Patience Ozokwor, the film is distributed by FilmOne Distributions. It recounts the story Jenifa as she confronts the challenges posed by a new neighbor who threatens to outshine her charity organisation.

The film is a sequel to Jenifa on Lockdown (2021), and the third film in the Jenifa franchise. Filming began in early 2023 and ended in 2024, with settings in Lagos, Kumasi, and Accra. Everybody Loves Jenifa premiered at IMAX on 8 December 2024. It was theatrically released on 13 December 2024. The film received generally positive reviews from audiences, and grossed 500 million naira within 12 days of its release. Everybody Loves Jenifa reached ₦1 billion at the Nigerian box office within 19 days of release, becoming the fastest Nollywood title to reach this milestone.

== Plot summary ==
Jenifa heroically rescues a child from a burning house, earning widespread praise from her community in Amen Estate. Her boyfriend, Shege, admires her deeply and introduces her to his business venture, "Shege-Jenifa Water." Meanwhile, Jenifa shifts her focus to her philanthropic foundation, which equips people with vocational skills through partnerships with prominent trainers like celebrity chef Hilda Baci and fashion designer Veekee James. As she is honoured as a humanitarian, her evolution from a bumbling past into a successful businesswoman and philanthropist becomes a source of inspiration for many.

However, Jenifa's life takes an unexpected turn when a new neighbour, Lobster, moves into the area. Sophisticated and well-connected, Lobster quickly wins the admiration of the community, overshadowing Jenifa's efforts and threatening her position as the local favourite. Initially welcoming him with her characteristic humour and charm, tensions rise when Lobster dismisses her proposal for collaboration. Her envy grows, and soon her suspicions are confirmed when she witnesses Lobster violently assaulting his wife, Olivia, leaving her in a coma. which after she uncovers Lobster's fraudulent activities, but Olivia's mother, Mrs. Agnes, remains silent due to the financial benefits she receives from Lobster. Determined to seek justice, Jenifa enlists the help of Madam Bassey, a women's rights activist with her own history of overcoming domestic abuse. Despite Madam Bassey's commitment, resistance arises when Lobster's sister-in-law, Ogechi, refuses to testify.

As pressure mounts, Lobster resorts to intimidation, even sneaking into Jenifa's room to threaten her. Undeterred, Jenifa organises a cultural festival to rally her community. However, threats from Lobster's associates escalate, forcing her and her friends, including Toyosi and Adaku, to seek refuge at Cordelia's house after surviving an assassination attempt.

Events take a thrilling turn during the Eko Fest, where Jenifa and her friends are pursued by Lobster's men. Seeking safety, Jenifa takes a gig in Ghana, hoping distance will provide relief. However, their trip unravels a sinister drug cartel led by the enigmatic Bebe. Their investigation into Lobster's past leads to comedic misadventures, including mistaken identities, awkward encounters, and a bold infiltration of one of Lobster's high-profile events disguised as reporters.

Amid the chaos, Jenifa struggles with feelings of inadequacy and growing tensions in her personal life. Her relationship with Shege reaches a breaking point when she declines his marriage proposal, choosing instead to focus on her mission. The stakes rise further when Toyosi confesses her involvement with a dangerous gang led by Sheriff, which draws Bebe and her associates into their lives. Jenifa and her friends are kidnapped and tortured by the gang, but a dramatic police intervention saves them, leading to Bebe's arrest.

In a climactic charity gala, Jenifa confronts Lobster in a heated exchange where his insecurities and need for validation are exposed. Moved by his vulnerability, Jenifa chooses to set aside their differences, merging their efforts to create a more impactful organisation.

In the end, Jenifa's resilience and compassion triumph. Her journey underscores the power of unity, self-acceptance, and forgiveness. The film concludes with Jenifa and Lobster co-hosting a charity event, symbolising their transformed relationship and shared commitment to uplifting their community.

== Cast ==
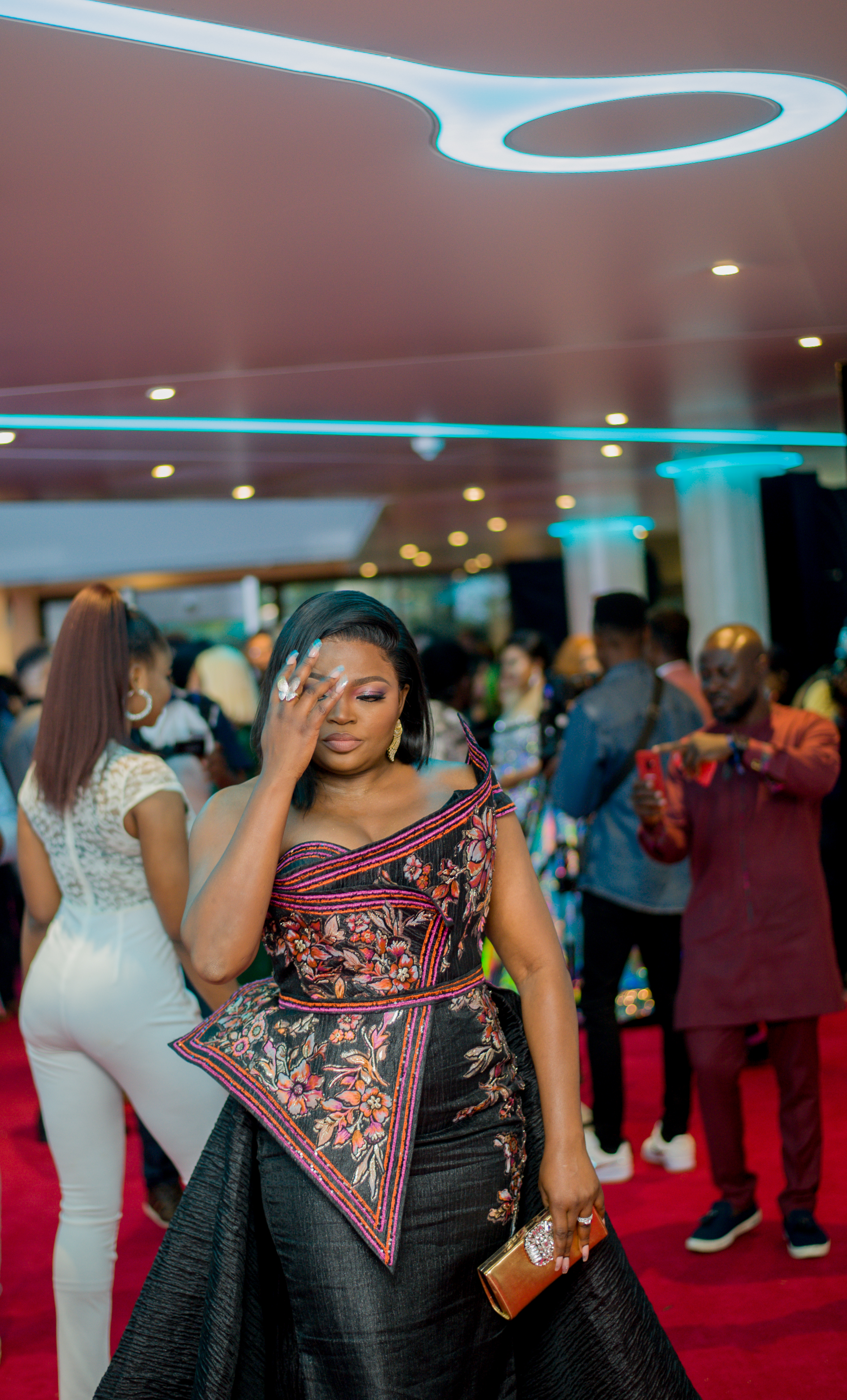
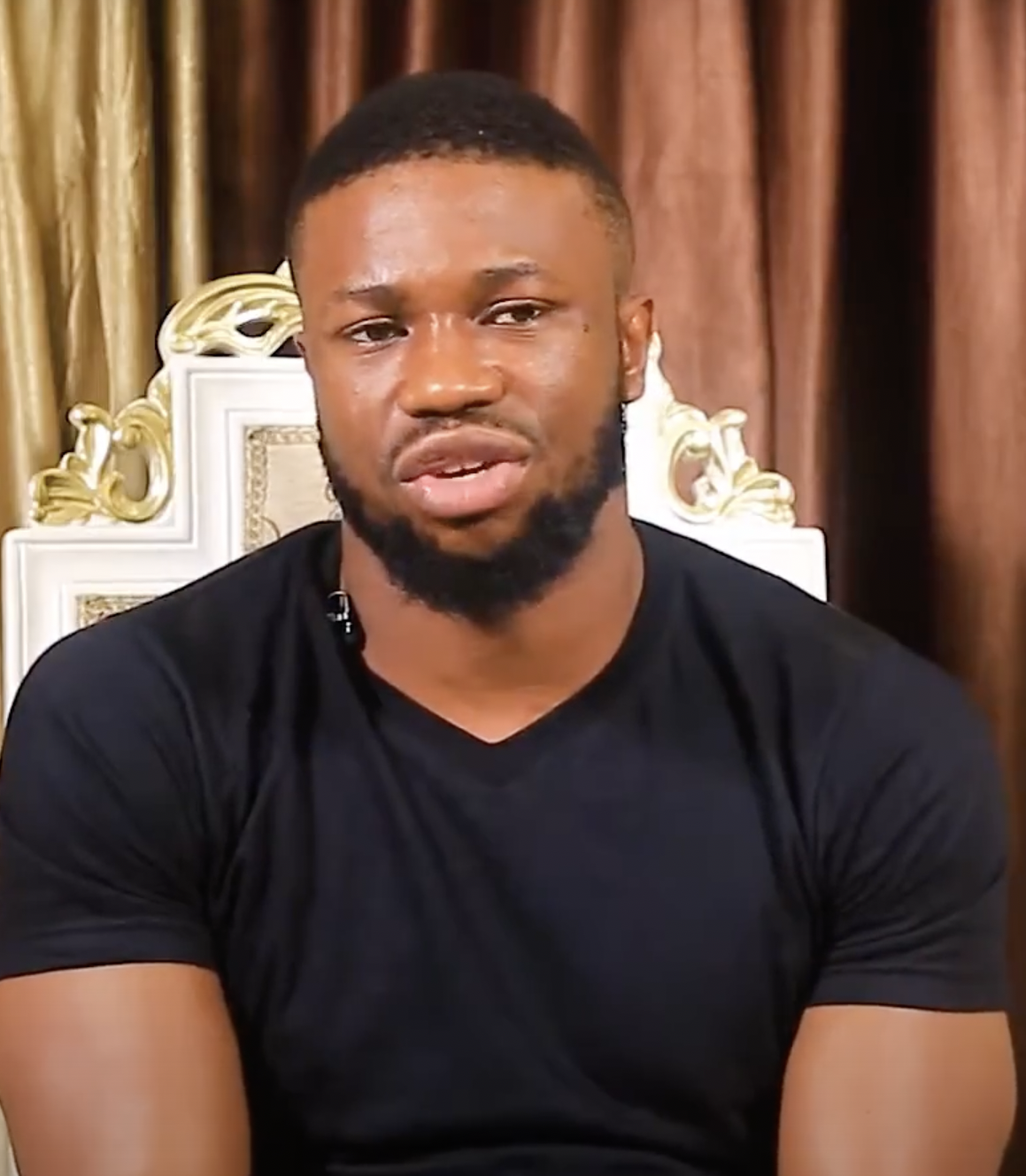
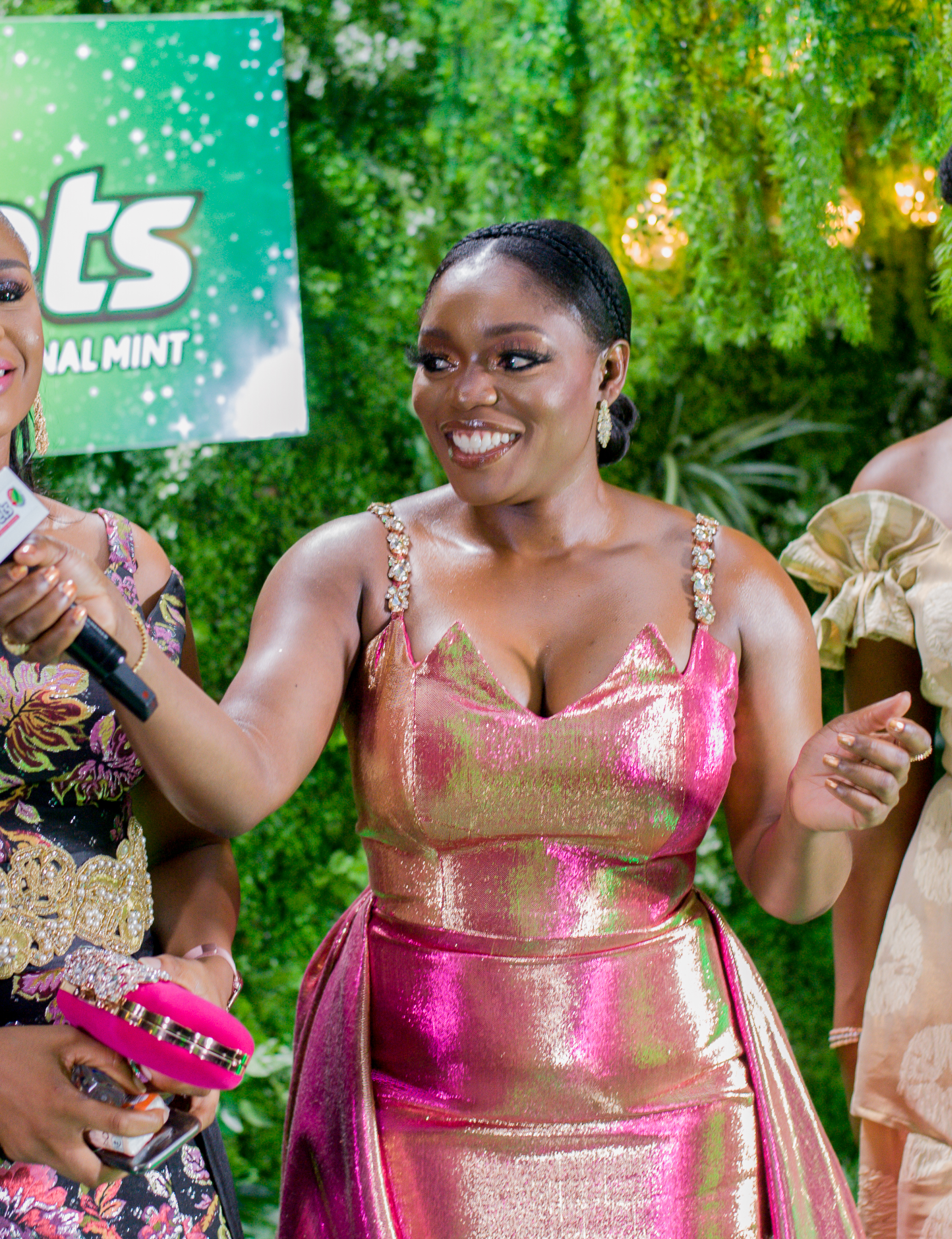
- Main characters: (left to right) Funke Akindele, Stan Nze and Bisola Aiyeola
- Funke Akindele as Jenifa, a selfless, humorous, and relatable personality, she uses her Foundation to empower women. Her efforts often address critical issues such as domestic violence and crime.
- Stan Nze as Lobster, a morally complex philanthropist and crime boss, operating as a crime boss with ties to fraudulent NGOs.
- Falz as Shege, Jenifa's boyfriend
- Omowunmi Dada as Mimi
- Jackie Appiah as Bebe, a cunning and dangerous kingpin operating a drug trafficking ring under the cover of a legitimate business.
- Nancy Isime as Olivia, Lobster's wife, whose toxic marriage leads her to uncover her husband's criminal activities.
- Destiny Etiko as Angel, Lobster's side chick
- Patience Ozokwor as Mrs Agnes, Olivia's mother, and Lobster's overbearing mother-in-law.
- Omotunde Adebowale as Adaku, a key member of Jenifa's inner circle, provides wisdom and guidance.
- Juliana Olayode as Toyosi
- Layi Wasabi as Rex
- Tope Tedela as Jordan, Bebe's right hand man and drug trafficker.
- Tobi Makinde as Timini
- Cute Abiola as Bada
- Bisola Aiyeola as Madam Bassey
- Lateef Adedimeji
- Chimezie Imo

== Production ==
Development and casting

In April 2024, Funke Akindele officially announced the development of Everybody Loves Jenifa, a spinoff from the acclaimed Jenifa franchise. The project was conceived as a continuation of the series' legacy while introducing fresh perspectives and heightened stakes for the titular character. Akindele served as the film's writer and co-director alongside Tunde Olaoye, aiming to blend humour, drama, and social commentary in a way that resonated with a broad audience.

Akindele expressed her ambition for the film by setting a box-office target of ₦5 billion, a bold declaration that underscored her confidence in the story's appeal. Shortly after the announcement, returning and new cast members were revealed, including Nancy Isime, Stan Nze, and Patience Ozokwor, alongside long-time collaborators like Falz and Omowunmi Dada.

During the production of Everybody Loves Jenifa, efforts were made to create a visually engaging experience for viewers. For one scene, an entire house was lit to achieve the desired effect, requiring the use of specialised lighting techniques and equipment. The production and post-production teams collaborated to integrate on-set lighting with digital enhancements during post-production, aiming to align the visuals with the film's narrative.

The casting process combined established names from the Jenifa series with new faces to add fresh dynamics to the narrative. Funke Akindele reprised her iconic role as Jenifa, while Stan Nze joined the cast as Lobster, Jenifa's rival. The inclusion of Adedimeji Lateef and Jackie Appiah brought further star power to the ensemble. Additionally, Akindele's first on-screen kiss in the film, where her character Jenifa kisses Shege, played by Falz, has sparked discussions among her friends and supporters.

=== Filming ===
Principal photography commenced in early 2024, with Nigeria serving as the primary filming location . The production involved a team of 100 cast and crew members. Key scenes were filmed at Amen Estate in Lagos, Nigeria, as well as in Kumasi and Accra, Ghana, to capture the film's diverse settings. The cinematography was led by John Njaga Demps, while Valentine Chukwuma handled the editing. Additionally, the team spent two days filming promotional content for the movie and the music video for Everybody Loves Christmas, a song released ahead of the film's premiere.

=== Music and score ===
Before the release of Everybody Loves Jenifa in cinemas, Funke Akindele and some cast members released a song titled "Everybody Loves Christmas," a theme song for the film. The five-minute video features several cast members, including Falz, Layi Wasabi, Dbanj, Patience Ozokwor, Chimezie Imo, Tope Tedela, Omotunde Adebowale-David, Bisola Aiyeola, Jide Kosoko, Omowunmi Dada, Juliana Olayode, Nancy Isime, and Waje.

Tolu Obanro, who previously worked on Battle on Buka Street and A Tribe Called Judah, returned to compose the film's score. His work blended contemporary Nigerian sounds with cinematic orchestration, enhancing the emotional and comedic beats of the movie.

== Release and distribution ==
Everybody Loves Jenifa premiered at the Filmhouse Lekki IMAX in Lagos on 8 December 2024 and was theatrically released across Nigeria on 13 December 2024, by Filmone Distribution. The film also premiered in the United Kingdom on 20 December 2024; however, tickets had sold out in the UK prior to the premiere date.

== Reception ==
Box office

Following its release, Everybody Loves Jenifa reportedly earned over ₦40 million on its opening day, setting a new record for the highest opening day gross for a Nollywood film, with ₦45.2 million. Within its first week in cinemas, the film earned ₦355.1 million, marking it as a commercial success in Nigeria. By its second weekend, beginning on 23 December 2024, its total earnings reportedly exceeded ₦700 million. Within 12 days, the film was recognized as the highest grossing Nigerian film to date.

Internationally, the film earned $100,000 during its opening week in cinemas across the diaspora, reportedly achieving the largest opening weekend for a Nollywood film outside Africa. Domestically, Everybody Loves Jenifa reached ₦1 billion at the Nigerian box office within 19 days of release, becoming the fastest Nollywood title to reach this milestone. The film's performance has been linked to its wide audience appeal, effective marketing strategies, and the popularity of the Jenifa franchise.

Critical response

Somi B of Nolly critic gave the film a 3 out of 5 rating and said "it's an interesting but uneven crowd-pleaser, propped up by undeniable star power and scattered moments of charm. Entertaining, yes, but ultimately unsatisfactory as a cohesive cinematic experience". Joseph Jonathan of AfroCritik rated Everybody Loves Jenifa 2.7 out of 5 stars, describing it as "a worthwhile film" as it does not try to rehash the experiences of Jenifa in previous years. However, he noted that the film suffers from a somewhat convoluted narrative as it attempts to balance two distinct storylines, With one part of the story set in Nigeria and the other in Ghana, the film introduces gaps in both narratives, leading to underdeveloped plot points and characters.

Muhibat Sulaimon of TheCable described the film as "a funny but flawed film", noting its disjointed narrative, which shifts abruptly from the Lobster storyline to the Ghana scenes, making it feel like two separate movies. However, she praised the cast's performances, particularly Bisola Aiyeola, Cute Abiola, and Layi Wasabi, who impressed despite being primarily known for his skits. Sulaimon rated the film 7/10. Daniel NSA of Ranks Africa gave the film a 2/5 rating − describing the film as a "nostalgia-heavy, slightly chaotic movie that will leave die-hard fans grinning and first-timers raising an eyebrow.
