= Jenifa (character) =

Fictional character from Jenifa series

- Jenifa (film series) character
- First appearance: Jenifa
- Created by: Funke Akindele
- Portrayed by: Funke Akindele (films)

In-universe information
- Full name: Suliat Adedayo
- Alias: Suliyat
- Species: Human
- Gender: Female
- Occupation: Businesswoman
- Spouse: Shege (Fiancé)
- Religion: Christian
- Nationality: Nigerian

Jenifa (born Suliat Adedayo) (sometimes spelled Suliyat) is a fictional character and the protagonist of the Jenifa (film series) franchise. She first appeared in Jenifa (2008) and later in The Return of Jenifa (2011), Jenifa’s Diary (2015), Jenifa on Lockdown (2021), and Everybody Loves Jenifa (2024). Funke Akindele gained recognition for her breakout performance as Jenifa and became the franchise’s central figure.

The character was created by Akindele as a way to reach out to young people. In an interview with CNN, Akindele said she uses storytelling to tackle social problems and to get young people to believe in themselves.

In the 2008 film, Jenifa is a village girl who goes to the city for university and tries hard to fit in.

== Background and character development ==
Jenifa's story begins in the 2008 film Jenifa, where she is portrayed as a naive young woman from a rural village who moves to Lagos with aspirations of success. However, she encounters numerous challenges as she adjusts to the complexities of urban life. Over time, Jenifa's character transitions from a gullible and uneducated individual to a more confident woman, learning to navigate the societal intricacies of Lagos with humor and irony.

In Jenifa's Diary, the narrative explores her social interactions, relationships, and entrepreneurial efforts. Jenifa often faces humorous and awkward situations from her limited education and frequent misunderstandings of complex scenarios. Despite these challenges, her determination, humor, and adaptability are key traits that have endeared her to audiences.

== Appearances ==
Jenifa first appeared as a character in Funke Akindele’s 2008 comedy-drama film Jenifa, the debut installment of the Jenifa film series. She remained a central figure throughout the franchise, starring in subsequent entries, including The Return of Jenifa (2015) and Everybody Loves Jenifa (2024).

== In other media ==
=== Film adaptation ===
Jenifa has been adapted into feature films, with the same actor portraying her:

- Funke Akindele also starred as Jenifa in Jenifa (2008) and The Return of Jenifa (2015).
- Everybody Loves Jenifa (2024), which served as third film in the Jenifa franchise, received mixed reviews.

=== Television adaptation ===
In 2015 character was adapted into a television series titled Jenifa's Diary. Created by and starring Funke Akindele as the titular character. In 2019, Akindele expanded the Jenifa universe with the spin-off series Aiyetoro Town, in which she reprised her role as Jenifa. That same year, Jenifa also appeared in Jenifa on Lockdown, another spin-off of Jenifa’s Diary, which focused on the reactions to the global COVID-19 pandemic.

=== Video games ===
Aside from the Jenifa films, the character is the subject of a video game called Jenifa Spells, which was developed by Akindele's team.

== Personality traits ==
Jenifa is characterized by her humorous and unconventional personality, blending innocence with a degree of street smartness. She often devises creative, sometimes comedic, solutions to challenges. Her speech, which combines Nigerian Pidgin English and Yoruba, contributes to the humor and appeal of her character. Jenifa is portrayed as self-assured yet somewhat naive, with flaws that make her relatable to audiences.

Despite her limited formal education, Jenifa is depicted as resourceful and determined, qualities that help her navigate and succeed in Lagos' competitive environment. Her character serves as a bridge between rural and urban cultures, offering commentary on themes such as class disparity, education, and personal development.

== Reception ==
Jenifa's distinct mannerisms and speech style have become recognizable elements of Nigerian pop culture, influencing aspects of language and fashion. According to Shalom Tewobola of Culture Custodian, the character's development from a naïve village girl to a determined and resourceful woman mirrors real-life experiences faced by many Nigerians. The continued popularity of the character contributed to the release of Everybody Loves Jenifa in 2024, highlighting Akindele's evolution as a filmmaker.
