= Paschaline Alex Okoli =

Nigerian actress

- Born: 3 July 1990 (age 36); Orumba South Local Government, Anambra, South East Nigeria
- Education: Imo State University
- Occupation: Actress
- Years active: 2010–present
- Notable work: Jenifa's Diary

Paschaline Alex Okoli // is a Nigerian actress who played Cordelia in the sitcom Jenifa's Diary.

== Personal life ==
Okoli is a native of Anambra State, a South-Eastern region in Nigeria.

== Education ==
She completed her basic and high school education in Anambra state. Paschaline Okoli graduated from Imo State University, Nigeria. She studied French.

== Career ==
Okoli started her professional acting career in 2010 with the movie titled Definition Of Love. She had her breakthrough in the sitcom Jenifa's Diary where she played the role of Cordelia, alongside Nollywood actress Funke Akindele. She was also featured in the movie title Omo ghetto.

== Filmography ==
- College Girls
- Bleeding Trees
- Educated Housemaids
- Secondary School Girls
- No More Campus
- Agege Bread Sellers
- Ugomma goes to school
- No More Widows
- The Wanted Girl (2014) - Jovina
- Jenifa's Diary (2015) - Cordelia.
- April (2016) - Shola
- Climax (2017) - Ada
- Expired Maiden (2018) - Roselyn
- Separated (2020) - Thelma
- Missing (2021) - Ifeoma
- Jenifa on Lockdown (2021)
- The Accident (2022) - Cynthia
- A Tribe Called Judah (2023)
- Faithful Love (2024) - Maureen

== Awards and nominations ==
Okoli was nominated for City People Movie Award for Best New Actress of the Year (English).
