= Jenifa =

2008 Nigerian comedy-drama film

- Directed by: Muhydeen S. A. Ayinde
- Produced by: Olatunji Balogun
- Starring: Funke Akindele; Iyabo Ojo; Ronke Odusanya; Eniola Badmus; Mosunmola Filani; Ireti Osayemi; Tope Adebayo
- Cinematography: Moroof Fadairo
- Edited by: Abiodun Adeoye
- Music by: Fatai Izebe
- Production company: Scene One Productions
- Distributed by: Olasco Films Nig. Ltd.
- Release date: 2008
- Country: Nigeria
- Language: Yoruba

Jenifa is a 2008 Nigerian comedy-drama film starring Funke Akindele. The film won Akindele the Best Actress in a Leading Role award at the 2009 Africa Movie Academy Awards. Other AMAA nominations included Best Nigerian Film, Best Actress in a Supporting Role, and Best Original Soundtrack.

The film was the first instalment in what evolved into a popular Nigerian franchise. A feature sequel, The Return of Jenifa, was released in 2011 and a soft reboot television series, Jenifa's Diary, was launched in 2015. The original series was followed by two sequels, Aiyetoro Town (2019) and Jenifa on Lockdown (2021). Jenifa Spell, an educative spelling app was released in 2019. Everybody Loves Jenifa, the third feature film of the franchise, was released in Nigerian cinemas on December 13, 2024. The movie also stars Tope Adebayo, Odunlade Adekola, Toyosi Adesanya, Alade Adeshina, Owolabi Adelaja, Kemi Afolabi, Bunmi Olatilewa, Moshood Oniyemi, Joke Oshin, Muritala Salam etc.

== Cast ==
- Funke Akindele
- Iyabo Ojo
- Ronke Odusanya
- Eniola Badmus
- Mosunmola Filani
- Ireti Osayemi
- Tope Adebayo
- Odunlade Adekola
- Toyosi Adesanya
- Alade Adeshina
- Owolabi Adelaja
- Kemi Afolabi
- Bunmi Olatilewa
- Moshood Oniyemi
- Joke Oshin
- Muritala Salam

== See also ==
- List of Nigerian films of 2008
