= Tobi Makinde =

Nigerian actor and filmmaker (born 1991)

- Born: May 16, 1991 (age 35); Lagos State, Nigeria
- Education: University of Lagos
- Occupation: Actor
- Years active: 1998–present

Tobi Makinde (born 16 May 1991) is a Nigerian actor and filmmaker. He became popular with his role as 'Timini' in the Nigerian TV series Jenifa's Diary. He co-directed one of the highest-grossing Nollywood movies, Battle on Buka Street, alongside Funke Akindele. In 2024, he received critical and audience acclaim for his portrayal of 'Shina Judah', a hoodlum in the blockbuster A Tribe Called Judah.

== Early life and education ==
Makinde was born on 16 May 1991 in Lagos State, Nigeria but is an indigene of Ilesha, Osun State. He was born to the family of Mr. & Mrs. Akinjimi Olufisayo Makinde. He spent most of his early childhood in Agemowo Town, Badagry, Lagos state. He acquired his primary education from Odofa Children's Home, Ogun State and his secondary education from Supreme Pillars College, Badagry, Lagos State. In 2012, he acquired his Bachelor's degree from the University of Lagos in Theatre Arts. In 2016, he earned his Master's Degree in Theatre Arts, also from the University of Lagos.

== Career ==
Makinde started off as a child actor and was greatly influenced by his father. He debuted the acting scene at the age of seven with the movie "Silenced", which was produced by Ralph Nwadike and directed by Tunji Bamishigbin.

At the age of 13, Makinde played one of the lead roles in the popular TV series "Kamson N Neighbors". He also featured in other projects, including Industreet and My Siblings and I. In 2015, he became production manager for Scene One Productions. Later on, he got the role of 'Timini' in Jenifa's Diary which earned him recognition. In 2023, he co-directed one of Nollywood's highest-grossing movie, Battle on Buka Street. In 2023, he played the role of 'Shina Judah' in A Tribe Called Judah starring Funke Akindele, Genoveva Umeh, Timini Egbuson, amongst others.

== Filmography ==
Year	Title	Role	Genre	Notes
1998	Silenced	Village boy	Drama	
2004	Full Circle	Nicholas	Soap opera	
2004	Tides of Fate	Keji	Soap opera	
2006	Kamson N Neighbours	Nathaniel		TV series
2016	Industreet	Feva	Drama	Assistant Director
2017	Jenifa's Diary	Timini	Sitcom	Tv series / Assistant Director
2018	The Missing Piece	Michael	Dramatic thriller	Assistant Director
2018	My Siblings and I	Samson	Comedy	Tv series / Assistant Director
2019	Aiyetoro Town	Timini	Sitcom	Tv series / Assistant Director
2019	Unmendable	Kitan	Drama	
2020	Catfish	Nola	Crime Drama	Assistant Director
2020	Omo Ghetto: The Saga	Ay Pomping	Crime Comedy Drama	Directed by Funke Akindele and Abdulrasheed Bello
2021	Jenifa on Lockdown	Timini	Sitcom	Web series
2022	Battle on Buka Street	Director	Drama	Cinematic directorial debut
2023	She Must Be Obeyed	Jay Jay	Drama	Limited series / Assistant Director
2023	A Tribe Called Judah	Shina Judah	Drama	Directed by Funke Akindele and Adeoluwa Owu
2024	3 Working Days		Drama	Directed by Ikechukwu Jerry Ossai
2024	Everybody Loves Jenifa	Timini	Comedy	Directed by Funke Akindele / Tunde Olaoye
2025	Benefactor	David	Drama	Produced by Adeoluwa Owu / Folakemi Bello

== See also ==
- List of Nigerian actors
