= Helen Paul =

Nigerian comedian and actress

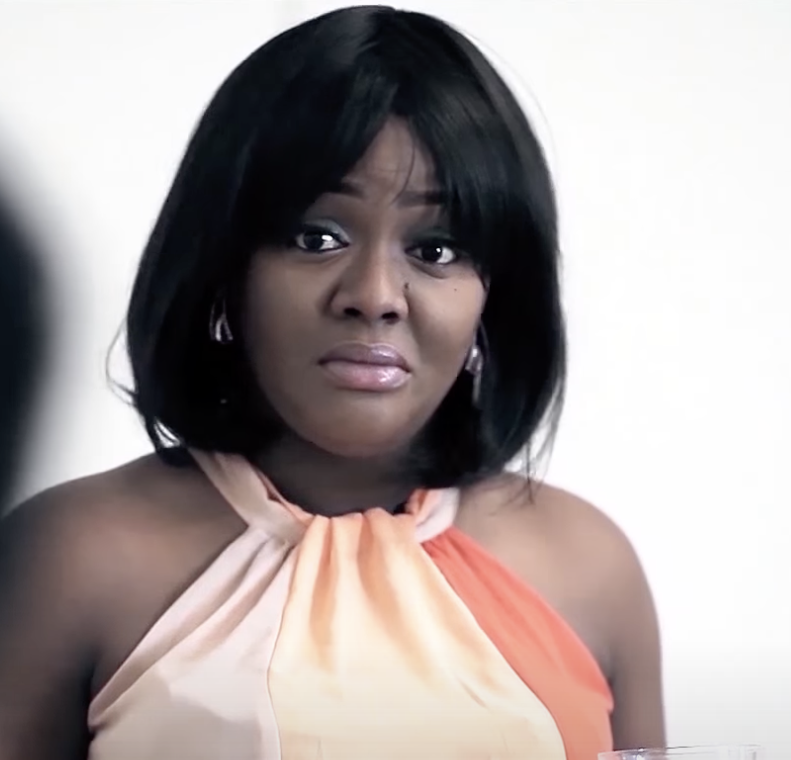
- Helen Paul in 2016
- Born: 1 May 1983 (age 43); Lagos, Nigeria
- Other names: Tatafo; Helen Paul Bamisile
- Education: University of Lagos
- Occupations: Comedian, actress, singer
- Spouse: Femi Bamisile
- Children: 2
- Website: helenpaulacademy.com

Helen Paul (born 1 May 1983) is a Nigerian comedian, singer, and actress. She is also a stand-up comedian, known as Tatafo, characterized by a voice range that makes her sound like a child.

She graduated with a doctorate in Theater Arts from the University of Lagos.

== Career ==
Paul has worked and served as a freelance and full-time presenter at several media houses in Nigeria. These include Lagos Television (LTV 8), Continental Broadcasting Service (CBS), and M-Net (where she currently co-presents JARA on Africa Magic).

Paul broke out as a naughty comic character on the radio program Wetin Dey on Radio Continental 102.3FM, Lagos. She was known on the programme as "Tatafo", a witty kid who addresses and lampoons societal issues in a satirical manner. She also presented programmes on TVC and Naija FM 102.7.

In July 2012, Paul released her debut album Welcome Party, which contains Afro-Pop songs such as "Boju Boju", "Vernacular", "Gbedu", "God Forbid", an Afro RnB song titled "Children of the World", and "Use Calculator", an enlightenment song about the menace of the HIV-AIDs epidemic. She subsequently released some singles, including "Take It Back". In 2018, she released the audio and visuals of her single titled "Never Knew", an inspiring song about her developmental years and career progress thus far.

Paul opened a bridal and fabric boutique in Lagos in 2012 called Massive Fabrics and Bridals. She has since proceeded to open three other outlets of the boutique in different parts of Lagos.

In 2014, she opened a film and theater academy, the Helen Paul Theater and Film Academy. It consists of a dance studio, a makeup studio, a recording studio, a rehearsal studio, a photo studio, a mainly digital library, an editing studio and a hostel for students.

== Personal life ==
Paul is married to Femi Bamisile and has two sons.

In 2019, She obtained her doctorate in Theater Arts from the University of Lagos, which she dedicated to her mother. In 2021, she relocated with her family to the United States. In 2022, she was announced as the HOD of the Arts, Music, and Entertainment department at Heart International University in the United States.

== Filmography ==
- 2011 – The Return of Jenifa – role of Tunrayo
- 2012 – A Wish – lead role, a woman who battles cancer
- 2011 – Damage – cameo role
- 2012 – The Place: Chronicle of the Book
- 2014 – Alakada2 – supporting role - as Ibidun
- 2014 – Akii The Blind – supporting role
- 2012 – Osas (Omoge Benin) – comic act - as MC
- 2012 – Igboya
- Mama Put – lead role
- 2016 – Jacob's Mansion
- 2016 – Full House
- 2017 – Samba (TV Series)
- 2018 – Ghetto Bred - as Debby
- 2018 – The bridal shower
- 2019 – Kasanova - as Teacher
- 2019 – Your Excellency
- 2022 – Stay - as Grace
- 2024 – Recompense - as Dupe

== Awards and recognition ==
- 2022 Professor and Head of Department Music, Art and Entertainment Heart Bible International University, U.S.A.
- 2012 African Film Awards (Afro-Hollywood, UK) – Comedienne of the Year
- 2012 Exquisite Lady of the Year Award (Exquisite Magazine) – Female TV Presenter of the Year
- 2014 Exquisite Lady of the Year Award (Nominated) – TV Presenter of the Year (Jara, Africa Magic)
- 2014 Nigerian Broadcasters Merit Awards (NBMA) – Outstanding TV presenter (Female) (Entertainment/Talk Show)
- 2011 City People Entertainment Magazine Award – Female Comedian of the Year
