= Industreet =

2017 Nigerian TV drama

- INDUSTREET
- Genre: Musical drama
- Created by: JJC Skillz
- Screenplay by: JJC Skillz
- Directed by: JJC Skillz
- Starring: Funke Akindele Linda Ejiofor Kay Switch Daddy Freeze
- Country of origin: Nigeria
- Original languages: English, Yoruba, Igbo, Hausa and Pidgin English
- No. of episodes: 39

Production
- Running time: 50 minutes - 1 hour

Original release
- Release: May 26, 2017

Industreet is a Nigerian TV drama and entertainment series that premiered on May 26, 2017, written by JJC Skillz and produced by Funke Akindele Bello. The project is focused on the African music and entertainment industry, and showcased the lifestyle, experiences and challenges encountered by newcomers in the Nigerian music industry before growing into stardom. It is music, movie and media oriented, explaining the Ghetto lifestyle experience.

Despite the similarity in name, this television series has no affiliation with Industreet Hub, a Nigerian digital marketplace and business operating system.

Produced by Scene One Production, it premiered at IMAX Cinema, Lekki and has been on TV screens.

== Cast ==
- Funke Akindele as Francesca
- Linda Ejiofor
- Lydia Forson
- Pearl Agwu as Mary
- Ruby Agwu as Jane
- Leo Ugochukwu as Tony
- Vivian Metchie as Mary's Mum
- Oyebanjo Oladotun Kehinde as AKG
- Tina Mba as AKG's Mum
- Honor Felix as AKG's Sister
- Motunrayo Idris as AKG's Girl
- Daddy Freeze
- Aderounmu Adejumoke as Kelechi
- Kay Switch
- Charles Okocha
- DO2dTUN
- Dayoslides
- Kalidobaby
- Martinzfeelz
- Tobi Makinde as Feva
- Tomike Alayande as Ada
- Funso Adeolu

== Guests ==
- Niniola
- Ushbebe
- Swishkicks
- Gemstones
- Mo Eazy
- Sonorous
