= She Must Be Obeyed =

2023 5-part limited series

- Genre: Comedy
- Directed by: Funke Akindele; JJC Skillz
- Starring: Funke Akindele; Nancy Isime; Akah Nnani; Lateef Adedimeji; Veeiye; Waje; Shaffy Bello; Chiwetalu Agu; Rachael Okonkwo
- Country of origin: Nigeria
- Original language: English
- No. of seasons: 1
- No. of episodes: 5

Production
- Producer: Funke Akindele
- Running time: 1 hour+ each

Original release
- Network: Amazon Prime Video
- Release: 29 September 2023

She Must Be Obeyed is a Nigerian comedy miniseries that premiered on September 29, 2023. The five-part series features Funke Akindele, Nancy Isime, Lateef Adedimeji, Akah Nnani, Patience Ozokwor, Mike Ezuronye, Ex BBNaija star, Veeiye, Waje and other Nollywood stars. The mini-series was produced and directed by Funke Akindele and her husband JJC Skillz. under the Scene One Productions.

== Synopsis ==
She Must Be Obeyed is about the lives of three successful music stars; SHE, Tito and X-cite (played by Funke Akindele, Veeiye and Waje respectively). Siyanbola Adewale, known as SHE, portrays a character determined to remain at the top, not minding who she tramples on to get there. A group gathers and forms to expose SHE's true nature, leading to revenge and deception in the music industry.

== Cast ==
- Funke Akindele as Siyanbola Adewale
- Nancy Isime as Victoria
- Veeiye as Tito
- Waje as X-cite
- Shaffy Bello as Iya Siyanbola
- Chiwetalu Agu as Uncle Mba
- Akah Nnani as Sisqo
- Lateef Adedimeji as Bayo, Siyanbola's brother
- Rachael Okonkwo as Adaeze
- IK Ogbonna as Pedro
- Blossom Chukwujekwu as PR Manager
- Adunni Ade as PR Officer 1
- Patience Ozokwor as Mama Cruise
- Adebimpe Oyebade as Adeola

== Production and release ==
The mini-series which was released on 29th, September 2023 had her premiere at the Filmhouse IMAX in Lagos, the premiere had Nollywood stars in attendance, including but not restricted to Toyin Abraham, Mo Abudu, Iyabo Ojo, Dakore Egbuson-Akande, Femi Adebayo, JJC Skillz, and the cast of the series. BBNaija Star, Veeiye who acted the role Tito has also expressed her gratitude to Funke Akindele who gave her the movie role to boost her confidence, Vee has explained how she had to send a direct message to her hinting on her interest in the movie industry and to her surprise Akindele responded and she got the role in the movie.
