= I Need to Know (TV series) =

Nigerian TV series

I Need to Know is a Nigerian family-oriented television series aired on the Nigerian Television Authority (NTA) that ran from 1997 to 2002. It starred Funke Akindele as Bisi, Uche Ejiogu as Ngozi, Taiwo Lesh as Hauwa and Amaka Egwuatu as Essien and was sponsored by the United Nations Population Fund.

The United Nations Population Fund (UNFPA) country office in Nigeria supported the production of a television series on adolescent reproductive health. This boosted the Federal Government’s effort to provide information, education and advocacy on adolescent health issues.

== Concept overview ==
The title of the series was gotten from a sound track that was produced in Kenya by the music group Kalamashaka and other local artistes with the support of the Kenyan Field Office of UNPFA. Originally conceived as part of the Composite Adolescent Reproductive Health in Nigeria (CARHIN) project, the television series revolves around the lives, adventures and misadventures of seven secondary school students who encounter the normal challenges of teenagers growing up in a fast changing world, the realities of HIV/AIDS, the tragedy of interrupted education. I Need to Know depicts young people actively grappling with these matters, sometimes getting the right information in time and sometimes suffering the consequences of ignorance or misinformation. The series was conceptualized with the objective of encouraging parent-child communication and open dialogue on adolescent sexual health issues. It aims through the many topics the series dealt with, to arm young people with the information they need to make informed and responsible choices. This in turn with help reduce their susceptibility to irresponsible and uninformed behavior that often results in teenage pregnancies, illegal and unsafe abortions, and contraction of sexually transmitted diseases including HIV/AIDS.

It has been demonstrated by research that these incidents generally result from a lack of knowledge on reproductive health issues. Primarily targeting young adults (aged 10–24 years), the television series the promoters of the series also hoped that families would use I Need to Know as an ice-breaker to encourage young people to seek counseling from parents and guardians, and also encourage the parents and guardians to equip themselves with appropriate listening and counseling skills. It also targeted policy makers who have the ability to provide a favorable environment for adolescents to have access to reproductive health information and services that give them the power of knowledge. I Need to Know attempted to de-mystify the discussion of sexuality issues between Parents and Children, thus encouraging Parent-child communication during this important process of growing up. The Programme also illustrated vividly the consequences of poor or ignorant choices made by young persons and the disadvantage of yielding to peer pressure. A total of 91 episodes (7 quarters) of Television and 104 episodes (8 quarters) of the radio series were produced. The series was aired by television stations from 1998–2002. It continues to re-run on a few stations.

== Production team ==
The series was conceptualized by a creative team led by UNFPA’s IEC department, written by Biola During-Olatunde, and produced/directed by Lloyd Weaver (who had helped produce the Of Black America series in 1968). The UNFPA Country team responsible for the production comprised Country Representative J. Bill Musoke, Deputy Representative Danielle Landry, Reproductive Health Officer Dr. Julitta Duncan and Senior IEC/Advocacy Programme Associate Ronke Oshin.

== Broadcast ==
The 30-minute weekly TV series was aired on private and state television stations in Nigeria under an innovative joint broadcast agreement deal that was unprecedented at that time in the development sector. The deal secured prime-time slots of the I Need to Know at no airtime cost to UNFPA. The terms of the Joint Broadcast Agreement stated as follows: a) UNFPA is obliged to air a minimum of 2 (two) spots of UNFPA public service announcements (PSAs) within each programme b) The remaining advertising time may be commercially exploited by the Programme User subject to conditions stated in 4c – 4e below. c) The following category of commercials may not be aired within or adjacent to the UNFPA programmes: Commercials containing political statements or campaigns, alcohol, drugs, tobacco or Baby formulae or breast-milk substitute products. d) The Programme User will abide by the laws, rules, customs, attitudes and advertising regulations in the host community of broadcast. e) Except where so stated, the programmes are to carry a maximum of 3 (three) or 6 (six) minutes of advertising commercials on thirty- and sixty-minute programmes respectively.

== Radio adaptation ==
In 2002, a radio adaption of the series was produced with support from the Canadian International Development Agency (CIDA). It was broadcast on 22 Radio stations under a radio joint broadcast agreement that was patterned after the television broadcast arrangement.

== Television and cable stations in the joint broadcast arrangement ==
- Adamawa Television
- African Independent Television Lagos
- Bauchi State Television
- Borno State Television
- Broadcasting Corporation of Abia State
- Delta State Broadcasting Service
- Edo State Broadcasting Services
- Imo Broadcasting Corporation (IBC TV)
- Independent Television, Benin City
- Nigerian Television Authority Channel 7, Ikeja
- Ogun State Television
- Ondo State Television Corporation
- Osun State Television
- Plateau Radio Television Corporation
- Rivers State Television
- Taraba State Television
- Minaj Television, Obosi
- DSTV/Multichoice
- Nigerian Television Authority (NTA) network

== Radio stations in the joint broadcast arrangement ==
- Cool FM, Lagos
- Rhythm FM, Lagos
- BCOS FM, Ibadan
- OGBC FM, Abeokuta
- OSRC FM, Akure
- Edo FM, Benin
- Minaj FM, Obosi
- Radio Rivers 99.1 FM, PH
- AKBC FM, Uyo
- Enugu Radio FM
- BCA FM, Umuahia
- IBC FM, Owerri
- PRVC, Jos
- Afro Radio FM, Abuja
- Ray Power 2 Abuja
- Kaduna Radio FM
- Katsina FM
- ABC FM, Yola
- Radio Benue FM
- Bauchi Radio FM
- Borno Radio FM
- Rima Radio FM, Kano

== Kalamashaka at launch ==
Seizing an opportunity offered by the group’s invitation to participate in the Benson and Hedges ‘Golden Tones’ concert in December 1998, UNFPA Nigeria organized the launch event on 16 December at the University of Lagos to feature an appearance by Kalamashaka, the Kenyan group that produced the song whose sound title-track gave the series its name. The synergy presented by a group of young Kenyan Musicians delivering the message of Adolescent Health issues was able to communicate to young Nigerians that adolescent reproductive health issues are real.

The launch event included the filming of a Cameo appearance of the Musical group Kalamashaka (visiting from Kenya) in the TV series, a sneak preview of the TV series to the media and guests, as well as a mini-concert by the Musical group. The event took place at the Institute of Distance Learning, University of Lagos. The group performed the title sound track: ‘I need to know’, in front of 2000 students from 25 secondary schools in Lagos. There was interaction between the group and the audience, to discuss ARH issues. T-shirts branded with the TV series title were distributed along with other give away items. UNFPA provided accommodation, transportation and security for the group from Monday 13 December, after they had concluded their Golden Tones concert and also arranged for their departure from Lagos to Kenya on Thursday 17 December. They were also paid an honorarium for their cameo appearance in the TV series.

== Impact assessment ==
In the third quarter of 1999 after I Need to Know had been airing for about one year, Research and Marketing Services (RMS) conducted an impact assessment/survey of the Programme. Some of the conclusions of the survey were that the Programme should be continued in order to consolidate on its gains and the series should be further expanded in reach in order to optimize its potential to save the lives of young persons. Another independent assessment conducted by the Canadian International Development Agency convinced the agency to fund the second year of the series as well as its expansion to Radio. The series was also broadcast by the Ghanaian Broadcast Service with permission from UNFPA Nigeria.
