= Adire (film) =

2023 Nigerian film

- Promotional poster
- Directed by: Adeoluwa Owu
- Produced by: Barbara Babarinsa; Mimi Bartels
- Starring: Kehinde Bankole; Femi Branch; Kelechi Udegbe; Funlola Aofiyebi-Raimi; Ibrahim Chatta; Yemi Blaq; Yvonne Jegede
- Distributed by: FilmOne Entertainment; Netflix
- Release date: 13 January 2023
- Running time: 123 minutes
- Country: Nigeria
- Language: English Pidgin
- Box office: ₦31 million

Adire is a 2023 Nigerian film directed by Adeoluwa Owu starring Kehinde Bankole, Femi Branch and Layi Wasabi. The movie has a runtime of two hours and three minutes and was released in cinemas across Nigeria on 3 November 2023. The movie was added to Netflix in January 2024, after a six-week run at the cinema which recorded a total gross of ₦31,061,100.

== Plot summary ==
Adire worked as a prostitute for a long time and wanted to leave, but her boss, Captain, stopped her. One night, she had a bad experience with a client and asked Captain to let her go, but he convinced her to stay. One day, Adire took Captain's money and escaped to a small town in Oyo. There, she pursued her dream of designing lingerie for women. In the town where she settled, Adire went to a local bar one night, people noticed her beauty and bold outfits, drawing attention from men in the town who come to watch her every now and then. This made the Christian women in the town upset. Facing hostility from the church women and a dangerous visit from Captain, Adire found herself in a risky situation that could destroy everything she had built and worked hard for.

== Cast ==
- Kehinde Bankole as Adire
- Femi Branch as Mide
- Kelechi Udegbe as Tobi
- Funlola Aofiyebi-Raimi as Folashade
- Ibrahim Chatta as Tega
- Yemi Blaq as Captain
- Yvonne Jegede as Shalewa
- Lizzy Jay
- Mike Afolarin as Deji
- Tomi Ojo as Simi
- Damilola Ogunsi as Ope
- Onyinye Odokoro as Abeni
- Ifeanyi Kalu as Thomas
- Layi Wasabi as Bar man

== Reception ==
Shola-Adido Oladotun of Premium Times noted that the film delivered powerfully on its character arc and also cements the lesson of "love your neighbour as you love yourself" and the commandment of "thou shall not judge". He also highlighted the fact that the movie was too easy to predict and gave it a rating of 5/10 at the end.
