= My Siblings and I =

Nigerian television series

- Directed by: JJC Skillz; Olasunkanmi Bello
- Country of origin: Nigeria
- Original language: English

Production
- Producer: Funke Akindele
- Editors: Kehinde Bello; Valentine Chukwuma

Original release
- Release: 2018 – present

My Siblings and I is a Nigerian comedy series, produced by Funke Akindele and co-directed by JJC Skillz and Olasunkanmi Adebayo. The series is based on the life of the Aberuagba family, depicted as an extended family made up of the parents, Solomon who is a retired army brigadier general and his wife Rosemary who is a teacher in the series. The first season premiered on the 6th of August 2018 and is ongoing.

== Premise ==
The series shows the odd behaviours displayed by each member of the family as well as friends of the family and the domestic workers, including heated arguments and periodic misunderstanding which go on in the Aberuagba family. No matter the crisis in the Aberuagba family, they always stand by each other in genuine love.

== Cast ==
- Funke Akindele as Vivian Aberuagba
- Chinelo Ejianwu as Lily Aberuagba
- Babaseun Faseru as Stanley Aberuagba
- Soma Anyama as Dave Aberuagba
- Jessica Orishane as Nnena Aberuagba
- Tomiwa Tegbe as James Aberuagba
- Patrick Doyle as Solomon Aberuagba
- Vivian Metchie as Mrs Aberuagba
- Esther Uzodinma as Angela Aberuagba

== Awards and nominations ==
- In the year 2019, the series was nominated for the City People Entertainment Awards.
