= Ijewuru =

1997 epic Nigerian film

- Produced by: Babatunde Bernard Tayo
- Starring: Eniola Badmus; Baba Tee
- Release date: 11 September 2012
- Running time: 160 minutes
- Country: Nigeria
- Languages: English; Yoruba

Ijewuru is a Nigerian comedy film about food competitions. It features the actors Baba Tee and Eniola Badmus. It was produced by Babatunde Bernard Tayo.

== Awards and nominations ==
At the 2012 Best of Nollywood Awards (BON), the film was nominated for the Comedy Movie of the Year. Additionally, Badmus was nominated for Best Yoruba Actress. The film was also nominated for Best Comedy Film at the Annual Yoruba Movies Academy Awards (YMAA) in 2014.
