= Funke Akindele =

Nigerian actress and producer (born 1977)

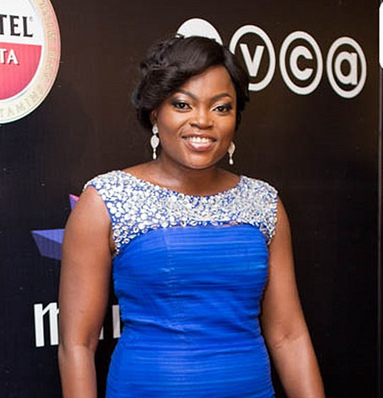
- Akindele at the 2014 Africa Magic Viewers Choice Awards
- Born: Akindele Olufunke Ayotunde; 24 August 1977 (age 49); Lagos State, Nigeria
- Other name: Jenifa
- Education: Moshood Abiola Polytechnic; University of Lagos
- Occupations: Actress; film producer; director
- Years active: 1996–present
- Political party: PDP

Olufunke Ayotunde Akindele // (born 24 August 1977) popularly known as Funke Akindele or Jenifa, is a Nigerian filmmaker, actress, director, producer, politician, and realtor. She starred in the sitcom I Need to Know from 1998 to 2002 and in 2009 won the Africa Movie Academy Award for Best Actress in a Leading Role for her performance in Jenifa, which brought her to fame. Akindele reprised the role in the 2011 sequel The Return of Jenifa and the 2015 soft reboot television series titled Jenifa's Diary, for which she was named the Best Actress in a Comedy at the 2016 and 2017 Africa Magic Viewers' Choice Awards. Akindele won the same award in 2020 and 2022, making it her fifth win for the Best Actress in a Comedy category. Akindele is the most nominated actress and filmmaker at the AMVCA and holds the record for most wins for an actress with six. She is the second director to gross over a billion naira at the box office and the highest-grossing director in Nigerian box office with a total gross of over ₦4.7 billion.

In 2022, she was nominated by the People's Democratic Party gubernatorial candidate, Abdul-Azeez Olajide Adediran, as the running mate for the 2023 Lagos State gubernatorial election.

During the World AIDS Day commemoration in December 2024, the Joint United Nations Programme on HIV and AIDS (UNAIDS) appointed her as the National Goodwill Ambassador for Nigeria, a role focused on promoting HIV prevention and awareness across the country.

== Early life and education ==
Akindele was born on 24 August 1977, in Ikorodu, Lagos State, Nigeria. She is a Yoruba woman. She is the second of four children (three girls and one boy). Her mother was a medical doctor, while her father was a retired school principal. She attended Grace Children's School, Gbagada, Lagos State. She obtained an Ordinary National Diploma (OND) in mass communication from the former Ogun State Polytechnic, now known as Moshood Abiola Polytechnic. She earned a law degree from the University of Lagos.

== Career ==
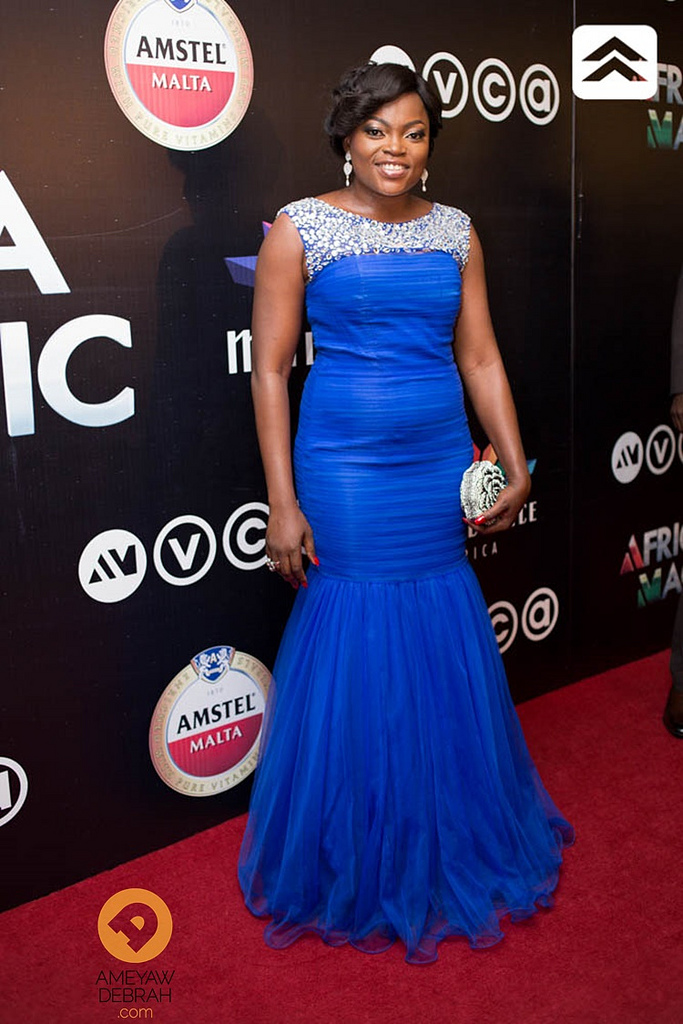
Funke Akindele at the 2014 Africa Magic Viewers' Choice Awards

Akindele came into the limelight after starring in the popular United Nations Population Fund (UNFPA)-sponsored sitcom I Need to Know, which ran from 1998 to 2002. She played Bisi, a curious but highly intelligent secondary school student. Akindele's big break came in 2008 when she appeared in the film Jenifa.

In 2010, she starred in the two-part gangster film Omo Ghetto, a cult-classic that influenced Yoruba pop-culture. She has produced and starred in several successful Yoruba films, establishing her as a household name in the region.

In 2013, Akindele expanded her career into English-language Nollywood films, earning wider recognition across Nigeria.

In an interview in July 2016, Akindele stated she was acting less in the Yoruba film industry at that time because of piracy. Akindele played the lead character in the TV show Jenifa's Diary, alongside Fisayo Ajisola, Falz, Juliana Olayode, and Aderounmu Adejumoke. The show was a soft reboot of the film Jenifa. The 2018 comedy film Moms at War starred Akindele and Omoni Oboli. In July 2019, Akindele started a new web series, Aiyetoro Town, a spin-off from her popular TV series, Jenifa's Diary. She was the former CEO of Scene One Film Production.

She made her cinematic directorial debut in the 2019 political drama film, Your Excellency.

Alongside Daniel K. Daniel and Blessing Egbe, Akindele was invited to join the 2022 membership of the Academy of Motion Picture Arts and Sciences, popularly known as the Oscars, as a voting member.

In 2025, The Hollywood Reporter named her among the most influential women in international film.

Akindele is often compared to American actress Taraji P. Henson. This comparison recently stirred up reactions after Nigerian content creator and actor Enioluwa Adeoluwa spoke against the comparisons between the two actresses.

In late 2025, Funke Akindele’s film *Behind The Scenes* became one of the fastest-grossing Nigerian movies of the year, surpassing ₦1 billion at the box office, in what was described as a milestone for contemporary Nollywood films.

Discussing the work behind Behind The Scenes, during a conversation with media personality Morayo Afolabi-Brown at a Wema Bank International Women's Day event, Akindele said she gave up her social life for almost two years, avoiding parties and public outings while she focused on the film, a period of isolation that led some colleagues to call her a "sadist" before they understood what she was building. In a separate interview with BellaNaija, she said she had similarly neglected her personal grooming and social engagements throughout production, adding that the film's commercial success followed sustained overwork, sleepless nights, and personal sacrifice. The National Film and Video Censors Board (NFVCB) subsequently honoured Akindele in recognition of her record-breaking box office achievements.

== Political career ==
Akindele was nominated as the Lagos deputy governorship candidate under the Peoples Democratic Party in the 2023 elections. Justifying her nomination, Abdul-Azeez Olajide Adediran noted that the actress added more value to his candidacy in the 2023 general elections. The actress confirmed her deputy governorship candidacy and stated that her acting career must be "necessarily put on hold".

== Charity initiative ==
Akindele established a non-governmental organization, the Jenifa Foundation, which aims to provide young people with vocational skills.

== Endorsements ==
Akindele has endorsement deals. These include being a signed Ambassador to Dettol and Irokotv. In 2018, she was signed as a brand ambassador for Keystone Bank. In November 2019, she signed an endorsement deal with WAW Nigeria, a company that manufactures washing detergent and bar soap.

== Personal life ==
On 26 May 2012, Akindele married Adeola Kehinde Oloyede. The couple divorced in July 2013, citing irreconcilable differences. Akindele married Nigerian rapper JJC Skillz in London in May 2016. Her pregnancy rumours were among the top-searched results on the Google search engine in August 2017. JJC Skillz announced the end of their marriage, which lasted six years, via his official Instagram handle on June 30, 2022. Akindele gave birth to twin boys in December 2018 and has several step-children.

In April 2020, Akindele was arrested along with JJC Skillz, her husband at that time and charged for having a birthday party for her husband during a mandated lockdown to curb the spread of the coronavirus. She later appeared in a Nigeria Centre for Disease Control video to raise awareness about the virus Akindele and her husband were sentenced to a 14-day community service after pleading guilty to violating the lockdown order.

== Accolades ==
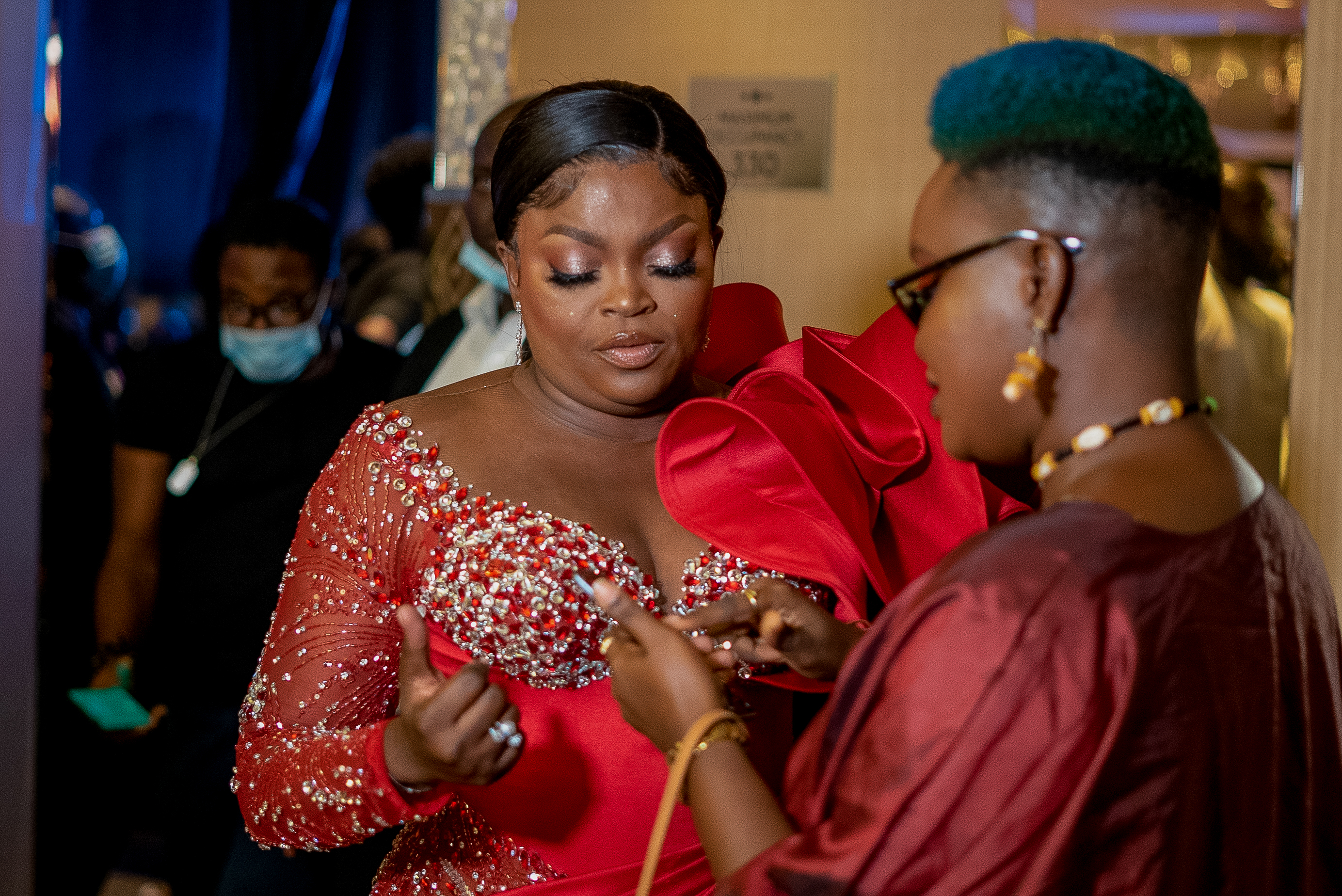
Funke Akindele at the 2021 Africa Movie Academy Awards

In 2025, her film Behind The Scenes became the highest-grossing Nigerian film of all time, breaking the record of Everybody Loves Jenifa.

Akindele has the most wins at award shows such as AMVCA and Nigeria Entertainment Awards.

She also produced and directed the five highest-grossing Nollywood films of all time: Behind The Scenes, Everybody Loves Jenifa, A Tribe Called Judah, Battle on Buka Street, and Omo Ghetto: The Saga.

== Filmography ==
=== Film ===
Year	Title	Role	Notes
2000	Final Whistle	Angela	Directed by Ifeanyi Ikpoenyi
2000	Final Whistle 2	Angela	Alongside Bukky Ajayi, Padita Agu
2002	Sharon Stone	Dupe	Directed by Adim Williams
2002	Sharon Stone 2	Dupe	Alongside Jim Iyke, Genevieve Nnaji
2003	Egg of Life	Isioma	Directed by Andy Amenechi
2003	Egg of Life 2	Isioma	Alongside Nkiruka Sylvanus
2004	Kádàrá Mi	Secretary	Directed by Abiodun Olanrewaju & Yinka Quadri
2004	Atlanta	Kudirat	Directed by Charles Novia
2004	Botife	Bisola	
2005	Agbara Ifẹ		Directed by Bakare Adeoye
2005	13th Day: Ọjọ Kẹtala		Directed by Sunday Ogunyemi
2005	13th Day: Ọjọ Kẹtala 2		Directed by Sunday Ogunyemi
2006	Narrow Path	Wunmi	Directed by Kunle Kelani
2006	Kosefowora	Folashade	Directed by Tajudeen Mobolaji Arotambo
2006	Oṣuwọn Ẹda		Directed by Yomi Fash-Lanso
2006	Agbe Fo	Yẹmisi	Directed by Abiodun Olarenwaju
2006	Agbe Fo 2	Yemisi	Directed by Abiodun Olarenwaju
2006	Oreke Mulero		Directed by Bakare Adeoye
2006	Ọdún Nbaku	Moji	Directed by Ibrahim Chatta and Dele Ogundipe
2007	Maku		Directed by Abiodun Olarenwaju and Yinka Quadri
2007	Ẹdujọbi	Taiye/ Kehinde	Directed by Abiodun Olanrewaju
2007	Ẹdujọbi 2	Taiye/ Kehinde	
2007	B'aye Ṣe Nlọ		Alongside Toyin Abraham
2007	Ọba Irawọ		
2007	Okùn Ìfẹ Yí	Bimpe	
2007	Egun		Directed by Yinka Quadri
2007	Akandun		
2008	Kàkàkí L'oku	Kàkàkí's wife	Directed by Anthony Ogundimu
2008	Kàkàkí L'oku 2	Kàkàkí's wife	
2008	Taiwo, Taiwo	T.girl	
2008	Taiwo, Taiwo 2	T.girl	
2008	Ajẹ̀ Mẹtta	Molayo	
2008	Ajẹ̀ Mẹtta 2	Molayo	
2008	Apoti Orogún	Bola	
2008	Jenifa	Jenifa	
2008	Àtànpàkò Mẹta		
2008	Ọmọ Pupa		
2009	Bolode O'ku	Funmi	
2009	Farayola	Oyinkansola	
2009	Jenifa 2	Jenifa	
2009	Anointed Liars	Flora	Directed by Innocent Chinagorom
2009	Anointed Liars 2	Flora	
2009	Iro Funfun	Tomilola	Directed by Muhydeen S. Ayinde
2009	Iro Funfun 2	Tomilola	
2009	Ija Ọla		
2009	Ija Ọla 2		
2009	Ọmọ Ìyá Kan		Directed by Daniel Ademinokan
2009	Apaadi		
2009	Apaadi 2		
2010	Omo Ghetto	Ayomide & Shalewa/Lefty	
2010	Omo Ghetto 2	Ayomide & Shalewa/Lefty	
2010	Sherikoko	Angelina	Directed by Amayo Uzo Philips
2010	White Hunters	Peggy	Directed by Afam Okereke
2010	Ogun Àìkú		Directed by Muyiwa Ademola
2011	Maami	Maami	Directed by Tunde Kelani
2011	The Return of Jenifa	Jenifa	
2011	Jelili	Betty	Directed by Tope Adebayo and Adebayo Salami
2011	The Perfect Church	Sister Angela	
2011	Ladies Gang	Samantha	Directed by Afam Okereke
2011	Ladies Gang 2	Samantha	
2011	Kujenra	Kujenra	Directed by Adebayo Tijani
2011	Kujenra 2	Kujenra	
2012	Married but Living Single	Kate	Directed by Tunde Olaoye
2012	A Wish		Directed by Elvis Chuks
2012	Dirty Diamond	Peace/Uju	Directed by Okey-Zubelu Okoh
2012	Wisdom of Thomas	Ihunna	Directed by Tchidi Chikere
2012	Emi Abata	Tinuke	Directed by Adebayo Salami
2013	Living Nightmares	Monica	Directed by Okey-Zubelu Okoh
2013	Oga On Top		Directed by Amayo Uzo Philips
2013	Jujuwood	Crystal	Directed by Tchidi Chikere
2013	Agnetta (O'mpa)		Directed by Amayo Uzo Philips
2013	Angelina	Angelina	Directed by MacCollins Chidebe
2013	The Fighter	Monica Lewisky	Directed by Amayo Uzo Philips
2013	Barren Women		Directed by Morgan Ukaegbu
2013	Azonto Babes		
2013	The Return of Sherikoko		Directed by Amayo Uzo Philips
2014	New Horizons	Sadie	
2014	Pretty Liars	Cleo	
2014	Madam Tyson		
2014	Chibundu	Chibundu	
2014	Mr Potosky		
2014	Love Wahala	Katrine	
2015	Fight For Peace	Aduke	
2015	One Fine Day		
2015	Uncle Oyibo		
2016	A Trip to Jamaica	Bola	Robert Peters
2017	Isoken	Agnes	
2017	Double Trouble	Modebola	Directional debut
2018	Moms at War	Olaide Adetola	Directed by Omoni Oboli
2018	Chief Daddy	Tinu Breecroft	Directed by Niyi Akinmolayan
2019	Unmendable	Rachael	
2019	Your Excellency	Kemi Ajadi	Cinematic directorial debut
2020	Who's The Boss	Hauwa	Directed by Chinaza Onuzo
2020	Omo Ghetto: The Saga	Ayomide & Shalewa/Lefty	Directed by Funke Akindele, Abdulrasheed Bello
2021	Dwindle	Officer Tolani	Kayode Kasum, Dare Olaitan
2022	Chief Daddy 2: Going for Broke	Tinu Breecroft	Directed by Niyi Akinmolayan
2022	Battle on Buka Street	Yejide	Directed by Funke Akindele and Tobi Makinde
2023	No Way Through	Jolade Okeniyi	Directed by Chinaza Onuzo
2023	A Tribe Called Judah	Jedidah Judah	Directed by Funke Akindele and Adeoluwa Owu
2024	House of Ga'a	Ayinba	Directed by Bolanle Austen-Peters
2024	Everybody Loves Jenifa	Jenifa	Co-directed by Tunde Olaoye
2025	Reel Love	Tomide's mother	Directed by Kayode Kasum
2025	Finding Me	Tinuke Olowoporoku	Directors Funke Akindele and Isioma Osaje
2025	Behind The Scenes	Adetutu Fernandez	Co-directed by Tunde Olaoye
2026	The Return of Arinzo		Directed by Iyabo Ojo
2026	Where Is Mr Right?	Madam Janet	Tunde Olaoye

=== Television ===
Year	Title	Role	Notes
1998–2004	I Need To Know	Bisi	
2004	Super Story: Campus Babes	Pat	
2009	Family Ties: Friends Forever	Shade	
2014	Screen Divas	Herself	
2015–2022	Jenifa's Diary	Jenifa	
2017–2019	Industreet	Francesca	
2018–2023	My Siblings and I	Vivian Aberuagba	
2019–2026	Aiyetoro Town	Jenifa	
2021	Jenifa on Lockdown	Jenifa	
2022	Far From Home	Patricia Bello	
2023	She Must Be Obeyed	She/Siyanbola Adewole	

=== Music videos ===
Year	Title	Artist(s)
2011	Pakurumo	Wizkid
2016	A Da	JJC ft Justina Lee Brown
2016	Bad	Tiwa Savage ft Wizkid
2020	Deceive	Yemi Alade ft Rudeboy
2020	Askmaya Anthem	Chioma Chukwuka, Eniola Badmus and Bimbo Thomas
2024	Everybody Loves Christmas	Cast of Everybody Loves Jenifa
2026	eko	Folapondis
2026	Ọrẹ Mí	Waje, Bisola Aiyeola and Chioma Chukwuka

== Awards and nominations ==
Year	Event	Prize	Work	Result	Ref
2009	Africa Movie Academy Awards	Best Actress in a Leading Role	Jenifa	Won	
2009	Nigeria Entertainment Awards	Best Actress	Jenifa	Won	
2009	City People Awards	Actress of the Year	Jenifa	Won	
2009	The Future Awards Africa	Acting	Jenifa	Won	
2010	2010 Best of Nollywood Awards	Best Actress in a Leading Role (Yoruba)	Ogun Aiku	Nominated	
2012	2012 Nigeria Entertainment Awards	Best Actress	The Return of Jenifa	Won	
2012	2012 Nollywood Movies Awards	Best Actress (Indigenous)	Emi Abata	Won	
2012	2012 Best of Nollywood Awards	Best Actress (English)	Married but Living Single	Nominated	
2012	Zulu African Film Academy Awards	Best Actress	Maami and The Return of Jenifa	Won	
2012	Yoruba Movie Academy Awards	Best Actress in a Leading Role		Won	
2012	Screen Nation Awards	Pan Africa Best Actress		Nominated	
2013	2013 Nollywood Movies Awards	Best Actress (Leading Role)	Maami	Nominated	
2013	2013 Nollywood Movies Awards	Best Actress (Indigenous)	Maami	Won	
2013	2013 Africa Magic Viewers Choice Awards	Best Actress (Drama)	Maami	Nominated	
2013	2013 Africa Magic Viewers Choice Awards	Best Actress (Comedy)	The Return of Jenifa	Nominated	
2013	Yoruba Movie Academy Awards	Best Actress in a Leading Role	Ife Gbona	Nominated	
2014	2014 Nigeria Entertainment Awards	Best Actress (Leading Role)	Agnetta O’Mpa	Won	
2014	2014 Africa Magic Viewers Choice Awards	Best Actress (Comedy)	The Return of Sheri Koko	Won	
2014	ELOY Awards	Brand Ambassador of the Year	Omo	Won	
2015	Best of Nollywood Awards	Best Supporting Actress-English	One Fine Day	Nominated	
2016	2016 Africa Magic Viewers Choice Awards	Best Actress In Comedy Role	Jenifa's Diary	Won	
2016	Nigeria Entertainment Awards	Best Actress Series	Jenifa's Diary	Nominated	
2016	Naija FM Awards	Sitcom Of The Year	Jenifa's Diary	Won	
2016	Naija FM Awards	Best Actress in Comedy	Jenifa's Diary	Won	
2016	Africa Entertainment Legend Awards	Best Actress of the Year		Won	
2016	2016 Ghana Movies Awards	Best Actress Africa Collaboration	A Trip to Jamaica	Won	
2017	2017 Africa Magic Viewers Choice Awards	Best TV Series	Jenifa's Diary	Won	
2017	2017 Africa Magic Viewers Choice Awards	Best Actress in a Comedy Movie or TV Series	Jenifa's Diary	Won	
2017	2017 Africa Magic Viewers Choice Awards	Best Actress in a Comedy Movie or TV Series	A Trip to Jamaica	Nominated	
2017	2017 Nigeria Entertainment Awards	Best Lead Actress	A Trip to Jamaica	Won	
2017	2017 Kids' Choice Awards	Favorite African Star		Nominated	
2020	2020 Africa Magic Viewers Choice Awards	Best Actress in a comedy	Moms At War	Won	
2021	Net Honours	Most Popular Actress		Won	
2021	Net Honours	Most Searched Actress		Nominated	
2021	Africa Movie Academy Awards	Best Actress in a Leading Role	Omo Ghetto: The Saga	Nominated	
2022	Africa Magic Viewers' Choice Awards	Best Actress in A Comedy	Omo Ghetto: The Saga	Won	
2022	Africa Magic Viewers' Choice Awards	Best Costume Designer	Omo Ghetto: The Saga	Nominated	
2022	Africa Magic Viewers' Choice Awards	Best Movie West Africa	Omo Ghetto: The Saga	Nominated	
2022	Africa Magic Viewers' Choice Awards	Best Overall Movie	Omo Ghetto: The Saga	Nominated	
2022	Africa Magic Viewers' Choice Awards	Best Television Series	Jenifa's Diary	Nominated	
2022	Africa Magic Viewers' Choice Awards	Best Africa Magic Original Comedy Series	My Siblings & I	Nominated	
2022	NET Honours	Most Popular Actress		Won	
2023	Africa Magic Viewers' Choice Awards	Best Actress In A Comedy Movie/TV Series	Battle on Buka Street	Nominated	
2023	Africa Magic Viewers' Choice Awards	Best Writer	Battle on Buka Street	Nominated	
2023	Africa Magic Viewers' Choice Awards	Best Overall Movie	Battle on Buka Street	Nominated	
2023	Africa International Film Festival	Globe Award Honoree	Battle on Buka Street	Won	
2023	NET Honours	Most Popular Actress		Won	
2023	NET Honours	Most Searched Actress		Won	
2023	Legit.ng's Readers' Choice Awards	Best Actress in 2023		Won	
2024	2023 Silverbird Man of The Year Award	Special Achievement Award		Won	
2024	2024 Africa Magic Viewers' Choice Awards	Best Lead Actress	A Tribe Called Judah	Nominated	
2024	2024 Africa Magic Viewers' Choice Awards	Best Writing (Movie)	A Tribe Called Judah	Nominated	
2024	2024 Africa Magic Viewers' Choice Awards	Best Movie	A Tribe Called Judah	Nominated	
2024	Legit.ng Entertainment Awards	Best Actress		Won	
2024	Africa Cinema Summit Legacy Awards	Honorary Award	Significant Contributor to the Africa Film Industry	Won	
2024	Africa Choice Awards	Female Movie Star of the Year		Pending	
2024	National Film and Video Censors Board	Box Office Champion		Won	
2025	Best of Nollywood Awards	Special Recognition		Won	
2026	National Film and Video Censors Board	Personality of the Year		Won	
2026	National Film and Video Censors Board	Audience Choice Awards	Everybody Loves Jenifa	Won	
2026	National Film and Video Censors Board	Box Office Champion	Everybody Loves Jenifa	Won	
2026	National Film and Video Censors Board	Box Office Champion	Behind The Scenes	Won	
2026	Africa Magic Viewers' Choice Awards	Best Supporting Actress	Behind The Scenes	Nominated	
2026	Africa Magic Viewers' Choice Awards	Best Movie	Behind The Scenes	Nominated	
2026	The Headies	Best Original Song for Visual Media	Behind The Scenes	Pending	
2026	CerAwards	Nollywood Icon		Won	

== See also ==
- List of Yoruba people
- List of Nigerian actresses
