= Justina Lee Brown =

Nigerian singer-songwriter (born 1984)

- Born: Justina Ogunlolu; 23 July 1984 (age 42)
- Origin: Lagos, Nigeria
- Genres: Pop; R&B; soul; blues; rock
- Occupations: Singer; songwriter
- Instrument: Vocals
- Years active: 2006 – present
- Website: justinaleebrown.com

Justina Ogunlolu (born 23 July 1984), known professionally as Justina Lee Brown, is a Nigerian Afro, funk, soul, blues, rock and jazz singer-songwriter.

She was the first runner-up in the Nokia First Chance reality singing competition in 2006. Brown won the Swiss Blues Challenge in 2019, made it to the semi-finals of the International Blues Challenge in Memphis, Tennessee (U.S.) in 2020, and won second place for Switzerland at the European Blues Challenge in Malmö, Sweden, in 2022. She was nominated for the Swiss Blues Awards 2022 and was the opening act for Zucchero at the Sierre Blues Festival in Sierre, Switzerland, the same year. In 2024, she won the Swiss Blues Awards, making history as the first African to do so.

== Early life ==
Justina Lee Brown was born in the streets of Ajegunle neighbourhood of Lagos, Nigeria, to a Yoruba father and an Igbo mother. Her mother gave birth to Justina at the age of seventeen and Justina lived with her mother on the streets of Lagos where her mother sold water sachets in the market. She had a tough start to life and discovered music as a result of being bored. She attended Unity primary school in Ajegunla. While growing up, she was heavily influenced by Anita Baker, James Brown, Lucky Dube and Miriam Makeba.

== Career ==
Brown came second at the Nokia First Chance reality singing competition in 2006. She then released a few singles before her first hit song, titled "Omo too Sexy", in 2008, and a music video for the song in early 2009. She followed the hit song with singles, including "The Morning After", "Radio DJ" and "So Tempting".

"Omo You Too Sexy" ticked a number of firsts; it was the first overtly sensual Afro-pop songs by a female singer, long before Tiwa Savage released Kele-Kele Love and changed everything. She was also the first female Afro-pop starlet to subvert the male gaze, actively pursuing the subject of her desire. Then there is the sound. Before Justina, Nigerian pop starlets tended to sing entirely or largely in accented English. She was the first to properly embrace pidgin as a medium in her music, a trope the male artists had all but adopted by 2009 when the song was released.

— The Native (7 March 2017).

In 2005, while visiting Switzerland, she met a German named Dean Zucchero who loved her vocals and performance and helped her set up her first band called "The United Nations" after singing live with them at a club. Shortly after her first taste of musical fame in Nigeria, she migrated to Switzerland. She was introduced at the age of 20 to the European music scene, where she delved into various genres such as blues, soul, jazz and afro funk.

In 2019, ten years after her first single in Nigeria, Brown returned with a new album, titled Black and White Feeling, then followed it up with Lost Child in 2023. According to her, "the latest album is a reflection of who she is, her truth, as a free and expressive entertainer who is not confined by any one genre or label."

She won the Swiss Blue Challenge in 2019, alongside the Swiss musician Nic Niedermann, and made it through to the semi finals of the International Blues Challenge in 2020. She and her band represented Switzerland at the 2022 European Blues Challenge, where she came second. She was also nominated for the 2022 Swiss Blues Awards, and together with her band opened the ZUCCHERO event at the Sierre Blues Festival. In 2023, she became the Ambassador of the Sierre Blues Festival.

=== Touring and performances ===
Brown has performed in more than thirty countries at concerts and festivals. Her electric performances and dynamic vocal range has been known to intrigue her audience and listeners. She performed at the Blues 'n' Jazz Festival in Rapperswil, Switzerland, in 2023.

Following the release of her latest album in September 2023, the singer said she was scheduled to perform in more than sixty concerts till the end of 2024.

== Discography ==
=== Studio albums ===
- A Touch of Blues (2013)
- My Baby (2015)
- Didn't I (2016)
- Black and White Feeling (2019)
- Lost Child (2023)

=== EPs ===
- Biliki (2024)

=== Singles ===
- "Omo 2 Sexy" (2008)
- "Tonight" (2016)
- "Mystery Boy" (2019)
- "Baby Tomato" (2019)
- "Biliki" (2023)
