= A Tribe Called Judah =

2023 Nigerian film

- Promotional poster
- Directed by: Funke Akindele; Adeoluwa Owu
- Written by: Funke Akindele; Collins Okoh; Akinlabi Ishola
- Story by: Funke Akindele
- Produced by: Funke Akindele
- Starring: Funke Akindele; Timini Egbuson; Jide Kene Achufusi; Uzee Usman; Tobi Makinde; Olumide Oworu
- Cinematography: Barnabas Emordi
- Edited by: Valentine Chukwuma
- Music by: Tolu Obanro
- Production company: Funke Ayotunde Akindele Network (FAAN)
- Distributed by: FilmOne Distributions
- Release date: 15 December 2023
- Country: Nigeria
- Languages: English; Yoruba; Igbo; Hausa; Nigeria Pidgin

A Tribe Called Judah is a 2023 Nigerian film produced by Funke Akindele and starring Funke Akindele, Timini Egbuson, Jide Kene Achufusi, Uzee Usman, Tobi Makinde Olumide Oworu, Genoveva Umeh, Nse Ikpe Etim, Juliana Olayode, Uzor Arukwe, Fathia Balogun, Yvonne Jegede, Greg 'Teddy Bear' Ojefua and many others. The film was released to cinemas nationwide on 15 December 2023. Akindele has said the film is dedicated to her late mother and draws partially from her mother's life.

== Synopsis ==
A Tribe Called Judah tells the story of a single mother, Jedidah Judah, who has five sons from five different fathers from five different tribes. The first two sons are responsible and try their best to work and support their mother. Meanwhile, the last three are less helpful: Pere is a chronic pickpocket, Shina is a hoodlum and tout in the community; and the last, Ejiro, is naughty and only cares about his girlfriend, Testimony. Despite their bad behavior, Jedidah continues to support them and get them out of trouble.

Things take a turn for the worse when Jedidah develops a chronic kidney disease, needing ₦18 million to fund her operation and ₦400,000 weekly for her dialysis. The first son, Emeka, loses his job, and the five sons see no other option than to rob Emeka's ex-boss, who is rumored to be a money launderer, to get the money to save their mother's life. However, their plans took a dramatic turn when they encountered armed robbers at the scene. The eldest son ended up losing his life to the operation, making him a sacrificial lamb for their mother's health.

== Selected cast ==
- Funke Akindele as Jedidah Judah
- Jide Kene Achufusi as Emeka Judah
- Uzee Usman as Adamu Judah
- Timini Egbuson as Pere Judah
- Tobi Makinde as Shina Judah
- Olumide Oworu as Ejiro Judah
- Genoveva Umeh as Testimony
- Ebele Okaro as Grandma
- Uzor Arukwe as Chairman Chigozie Onouha
- Nse Ikpe Etim as Collette
- Juliana Olayode as Hilda
- Fathia Balogun as Mama Caro
- Paschaline Alex Okoli as Mummy Michael
- Sinmi Hassan as Daddy Michael
- Yvonne Jegede as Modupe
- Boma Akpore as Deji
- Ibrahim Yekini as Itele
- Etinosa Idemudia as Blast
- Nosa Rex as Jerry
- Ifeanyi Felix as Police Officer
- Amber May Joseph as Bisi
- Gregory Ojefua as Pluto

== Production and release ==
Following the release of A Tribe Called Judah to cinemas on December 15, 2023, the film became the first Nollywood film to gross over ₦113 million in its opening weekend. The film became the first Nollywood movie to hit 1 billion naira at the box office. It is currently the second highest-grossing Nigerian film of all time.

== Awards and nominations ==
Year	Award	Category	Recipient	Result	Ref
2024	Africa Magic Viewers' Choice Awards	Best Makeup	Feyisayo Oyebisi	Nominated	
2024	Africa Magic Viewers' Choice Awards	Best Writing - Movie	Funke Akindele, Collins Okoh & Akinlabi Ishola	Nominated	
2024	Africa Magic Viewers' Choice Awards	Best Lead Actress	Funke Akindele	Nominated	
2024	Africa Magic Viewers' Choice Awards	Best Movie		Nominated	
2024	Africa Magic Viewers' Choice Awards	Best Supporting Actor	Timini Egbuson	Nominated	
2025	The Headies	Soundtrack of the Year	Tolu Obanro & Abbey Wonder	Won	
