= The Return of Jenifa =

2011 Nigerian film

- Directed by: Muhydeen Ayinde
- Written by: Funke Akindele
- Produced by: Funke Akindele
- Starring: Funke Akindele; Denrele Edun; Rukky Sanda; Yinka Quadri; Helen Paul; Ireti Osayemi; Mercy Aigbe; Eldee; Ronke Ojo; Antar Laniyan; Tope Adebayo
- Cinematography: D.J. Tee
- Distributed by: Olasco Films and Records
- Release date: 23 September 2011
- Running time: 172 minutes
- Country: Nigeria
- Languages: Yoruba, English

The Return of Jenifa is a 2011 Nigerian comedy drama film. The film was produced by Funke Akindele, who was also starred as the titular character, reprising her role from the prequel, Jenifa (2008). It was directed by Muhydeen Ayinde. Within a week of its October 7th release in 2011, the film became the fastest grossing Nollywood film of all time. As of 2024, it ranks 96th on the list of highest grossing Nigerian films.

== Plot ==
After the events of Jenifa, Suliat, now fully immersed in her "Jenifa" persona, decides to start afresh following a series of humiliating and life-changing experiences. She relocates to Lagos, determined to pursue her dreams while staying out of trouble. Despite her efforts, Jenifa's past indiscretions catch up with her, and she must confront the consequences of her choices.

The story follows her attempts to rebuild her life, including enrolling in a hairdressing program and seeking new friendships. However, her penchant for mischief and the desire to fit into the high-society lifestyle bring more complications. Through resilience and self-discovery, Jenifa learns valuable lessons about integrity, self-respect, and the importance of making better choices.

== Cast ==
- Funke Akindele as Jenifa
- Eniola Badmus
- Naeto C
- Denrele Edun
- eLDee
- Freeze
- Kaffy
- Antar Laniyan
- Omawumi Megbele
- Ronke Ojo
- Sasha P
- Helen Paul
- Yinka Quadri
- Rukky Sanda
- Banky W.
- Wizkid
- DJ Zeez
