= Layi Wasabi =

Nigerian comedian

- Born: Isaac Ayomide Olayiwola
- Education: Bowen University

Comedy career
- Years active: 2015–2020
- Medium: comedy; film; television
- Genres: humor; comedy; Satire
- Subjects: Nigeria Culture; everyday life; law

Isaac Olayiwola, better known by the stage name Layi Wasabi, is a Nigerian comedian and actor.

He won the award for Best Content Creator at the 2024 Africa Magic Viewers' Choice Awards.

His acting credits include roles in Everybody Loves Jenifa, Aníkúlápó and Adire, the latter of which took ₦31 million at the box office.

== Filmography ==
| Year | Film | Role |
|---|---|---|
| 2025 | After 30 | |
| 2024 | Everybody Loves Jenifa | Rex |
| 2024 | Aníkúlápó: Rise of the Spectre | |
| 2023 | Adire | Bar man |
