= Ireti Osayemi =

Nigerian actress (born 1982)

- Born: Ireti Osayemi; 14 January 1982 (age 44); Lagos State
- Education: Lagos State University
- Occupations: Actress; Producer; Performer
- Spouse: Bekky Adeoye

Ireti Osayemi (born 14 January 1982) is a Nigerian Yoruba-language film actress.

== Background and education ==
Ireti Osayemi was born on January 14, 1982. She and her parents had lived in Liberia before returning to Nigeria during the Liberian civil war. She is from Lagos state, where she received her entire education. Ireti went on to Ajumoni Secondary School in Lagos after finishing primary school and earning her West African Leaving Certificate.

She later attended Lagos State University in Ojo, Lagos, where she earned a Bachelor's Degree in Economics.

== Career ==
Ireti Osayemi entered the Nigerian film business in 1999 and began appearing in Nollywood films. She primarily appeared in Yoruba films alongside Funke Akindele, Eniola Badmus, and Odunlade Adekola.

== Filmography ==
- Omo Ghetto (2010) as Skoda
- The Return of Jenifa (2011)
- The Vendor (2018)

== Personal life ==
Ireti Osayemi married Nollywood movie producer Bakky Adeoye in 2008, and their marriage has two children.

She had their first child in 2007 before they got married, and their second child in 2009, after they got married.

== Awards and nominations ==
Year	Award ceremony	Category	Film	Result	Ref
2017	Best of Nollywood Awards	Best Supporting Actress –Yoruba	Ojo Meta	Won	
2020	Best of Nollywood Awards	Best Supporting Actress –Yoruba	Never Too Late	Nominated	
