= Aderounmu Adejumoke =

Nigerian actress (1984–2024)

Adejumoke Aderounmu
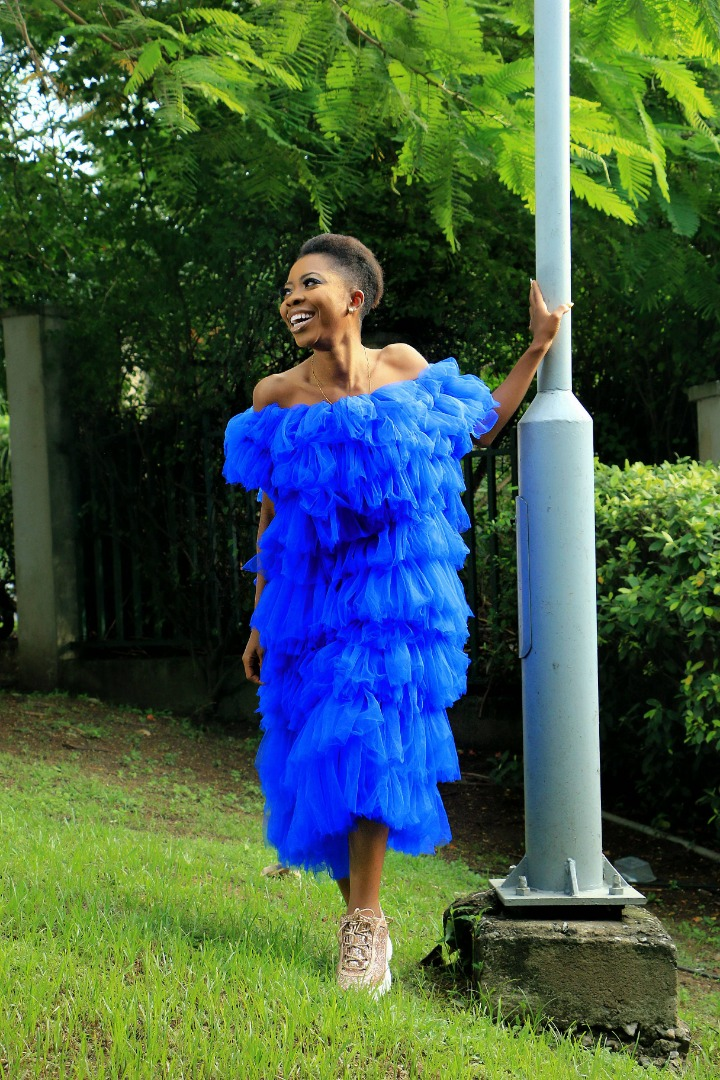
- Aderounmu in 2019
- Born: 26 March 1984; Abeokuta, Ogun State, Nigeria
- Died: April 2024 (aged 40)
- Education: Abeokuta Girls' Grammar School Onikolobo Abeokuta, Obafemi Awolowo University, La CinéFabrique Lyon France
- Occupations: Actress; television producer
- Years active: 2008–2024
- Known for: Jenifa's Diary, Industreet
- Awards: Maya Africa Awards 4.0 Face of Nollywood

Adejumoke Aderounmu ( 26 March 1984 – 6 or 7 April 2024) was a Nigerian actress. She is best known for playing roles like Esther in the popular Nollywood TV series Jenifa's Diary, Kelechi in the series Industreet, and Jummy Adams in the Nollywood film Alakada 2 (2013).

== Early life and education ==
Adejumoke was born into a family of five on 26 March 1984, at the Sacred Heart Hospital in Abeokuta, Ogun State, southwest Nigeria.

Aderounmu attended St Banerdettes private schools Ibara Abeokuta, Abeokuta Girls' Grammar School Onikolobo Abeokuta before proceeding to obtain a Bachelor of Arts Degree in international relations from Obafemi Awolowo University, Ile Ife, Osun State in the southwestern region of Nigeria. She served one year of national service at Gombe State. She was also certified in film making and acting from the La CinéFabrique multimédia in Lyon, France, in 2017 after she won a Ford Foundation scholarship at the Africa International Film Festival on her completion of a DSLR Film Making Training For Young Nigerian Film Makers in 2016.

She began acting professionally after auditioning for Tunde Kelani's movie Arugba in 2008, in which she played the role of Princess Mobandele alongside Bukky Wright, Bukola Awoyemi, and Segun Adefila.

== Career ==
Adejumoke gained recognition in 2016 for her leading role as Esther in the comedy TV series Jenifa's Diary. She has over 10 movies (English/Yoruba) to her credit as an actress.

She worked as an on-air personality at Goldmyne Entertainment Presenter for Box Office TV show under Daniel Ademinokan in 2010/2011. She worked at Concert Radio (an online radio station in Nigeria) from 2012 until 2015.

She produced the first season of her TV show The Lounge with Jumoke, an entertainment show featuring celebrity interviews and fashion opinions, in 2012.

== Personal life and death ==
Aderounmu was never married.

She died on 6 April 2024 at the age of 40.

== Brands and endorsements ==
- Hadassah Bridals (2018)

== Selected filmography ==
S/N	Year	Film	Role
1	2021	La Femme Anjola	Adanna
2	2021	Gone	Clara
3	2020	When Love is not Enough	
4	2018	Kayamata	young lady
5	2017	Industreet	Kelechi
6	2017	Blogger's wife	blogger's wife friend
7	2016	Jenifa's Diary	Esther
8	2015	The Ex	Funmi
9	2014	Dazzling Mirage	Yejide
10	2013	Alakada	Jummy
12	2013	Wings of My Dreams	
13	2009	The Unwritten 1&2	
14	2008	Patriots TV series	
15	2008	Arugba	Mobandele

== Awards and nominations ==
- Nominated for Best Actress at the African International Film Festival, Dallas, Texas (2016)
- Nominated as Revelation of the Year, BON awards, Nigeria (2015)
- Winner MayaAfrica Awards 4.0 Face Of Nollywood (2016)
- Winner Scream Awards New Face of Nollywood (2017)

== See also ==
- List of Yoruba people
