= Wazobia FM =

Radio station with branches across Nigeria

- Nigeria
- Frequencies: 99.9 MHz Abuja; 95.1 MHz Kano; 95.1 MHz Lagos; 94.1 MHz Port Harcourt; 93.7 MHz Onitsha

Ownership
- Owner: Aim Group
- Sister stations: Arewa radio Cool FM; Kidz FM; Nigeria Info

History
- Founded: November 2007
- First air date: 2007

Links
- Website: www.wazobiafm.com

Wazobia FM is a Nigerian pidgin radio station that broadcasts their programs in pidgin and other indigenous languages which includes Igbo, Yoruba, and Hausa. It has stations in Lagos, Kano, Abuja, Port Harcourt and Onitsha.

The radio station is owned by Aim Group, who are also the owners of Cool FM, Nigeria Info, Arewa radio and Kidz FM.

== History ==
Wazobia FM 95. 1 was founded in November 2007, in Lagos State by Aim Group and it was the first pidgin radio station in Nigeria. One year later, another branch was opened in Port Harcourt with 94.1 frequency, followed by a branch in Abuja in January 2011 with the frequency 99.5, and then another in Kano State with the frequency 95.1 in October 2011. In July 2018, another branch was opened in Onitsha, Anambra State.

== Stations ==
Wazobia stations
Frequency	City
99.5 MHz	Abuja
95.1 MHz	Kano
95.1 MHz	Lagos
93.7 MHz	Onitsha
94.1 MHz	Port Harcourt
