= Lolo1 =

Nigerian radio presenter, comedienne, compere and actoress

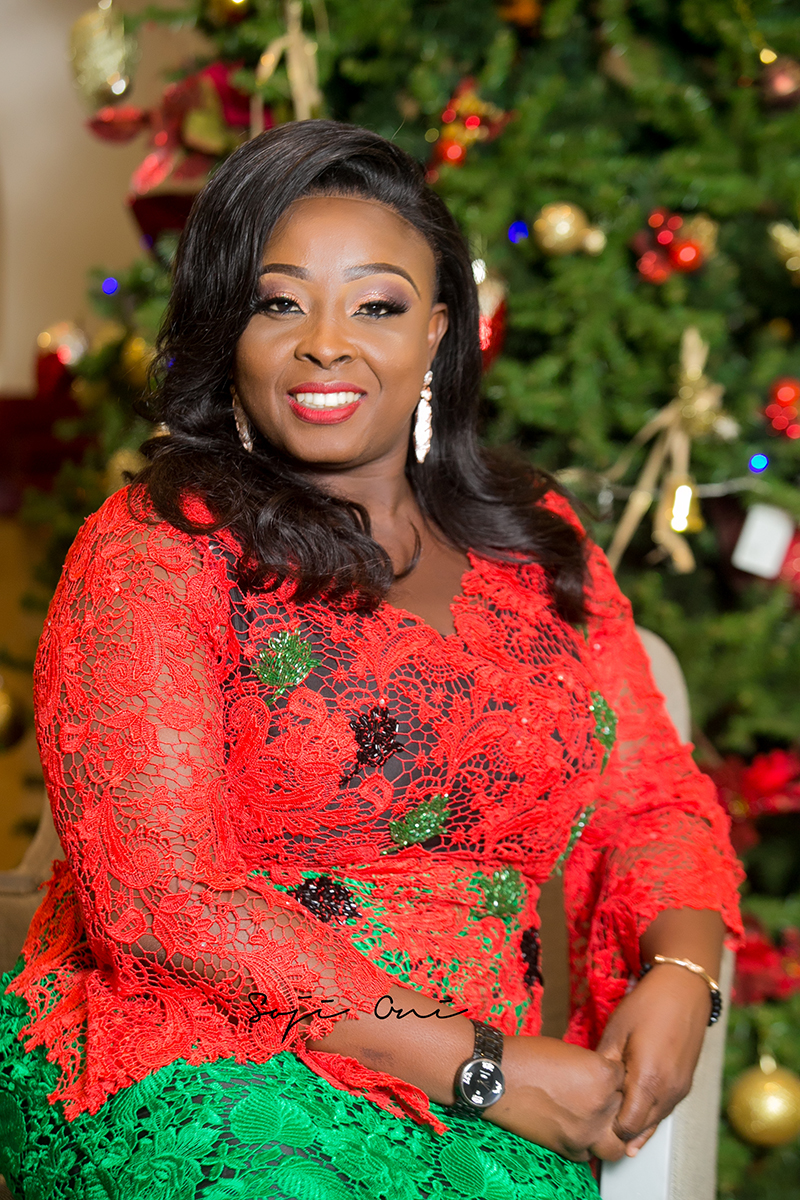
- Born: Omotunde Adebowale David; 27 April 1977 (age 49); Ogun, Nigeria
- Education: Lagos State University
- Occupations: Actress, Radio presenter, Comedienne
- Years active: 2000 – present
- Children: 4

Omotunde Adebowale David, popularly known as Lolo1, is a Nollywood actress, and a Nigerian radio presenter. She hosted the radio programme, 'Oga Madam' on Wazobia FM 95.1, till 2019 when she left and joined Lasgidi FM as the general manager and an on-air personality.

== Early life and education ==
She attended Ijebu-Ode Anglican Girls secondary school where she also spent part of her school days in a hostel. She is a graduate of Law from Lagos State University and she later went to law school.

== Career ==
She started her career as a legal practitioner after being called to the bar in 2000. She worked in the law department before dropping it for media broadcasting in 2004. She is also known for acting, in Yoruba and English movies. She featured in the TV series Jenifa's Diary where she acted as Adaku. She became an On Air Personality for the first time when she joined Metro FM. She later joined Wazobia FM, then she left in 2019 after over 11 years with them.

She got the nickname Lolo1 during a radio live show when she requested a nickname from people, and she eventually picked lolo.

She was featured in the cover page for La Mode Magazine for the July 2017 edition.

She played the role of Ms. Wilson in the 2018 film We Don't Live Here Anymore by Tope Oshin.

In 2020, she produced her first movie titled When Love is not Enough. The movie was directed by Okiki Afolayan, starring Funso Adeolu, Adejumoke Aderounmu, Odunola Agoro, Ladi Folarin, and Deyemi Okanlawon.

She was announced as the first ambassador of Awabah, Micro Pensions company.

== Awards and nominations ==
- Nigerian Broadcasters Merit Award for Outstanding Radio Program Presenter- Lagos

== Personal life ==
She is a single mother of three sons and a daughter.
