= Juliana Olayode =

Nigerian actress and sexual purity activist (born 1995)

- Born: Juliana Oluwatobiloba Olayode; 7 June 1995 (age 31); Lagos, Nigeria
- Other name: Toyo Baby
- Occupations: Actress, author
- Years active: 2015–present

Juliana Oluwatobiloba Olayode, also known as Toyo Baby, is a Nigerian actress and sexual purity activist.

== Early life ==
Olayode was born into a Yoruba a family of eight, in Lagos, Nigeria.

== Career ==
Before she came to the limelight, she had featured in about four movies including Couple of Days where she featured as "Judith". She clinched the role of Toyo Baby in Jenifa's Diary, which gave her sobriquet she is known under.

== Autobiography ==
In the second half of 2017, Olayode published her autobiography, Rebirth: From Grass to Grace. In the book, she talks about her personal life, sexual abuse, and career struggles.

== Selected filmography ==
- Jenifa's Diary (2015) as Toyosi/Toyo Baby
- Where Does Beauty Go
- Rivers Between
- Couple of Days (2016) as Judith
- Life of Disaster
- The Cokers (2019) as Funke
- Stepping Into Maggie's Shoes (2020)
- Becoming Abi (2021) as Joyce
- The Wait (2021) as Funbi
- The Bride Price (2023) as Tracy
- A Tribe Called Judah (2023) as Hilda
- The Beads (2024) as Sade
- Beast of Two Worlds (2024) as Iyawo Alani
- House of Ga'a (2024) as Bibanke
- Everybody Loves Jenifa (2024)

== See also ==
- List of Nigerian film producers
