= Eniola Badmus =

Nigerian actress

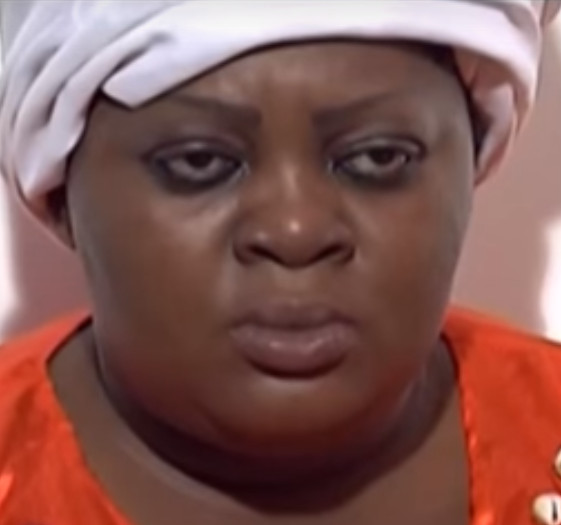
- Badmus in 2025
- Born: Ijebu Ode, Ogun State, Nigeria
- Education: University of Ibadan; Lagos State University
- Occupations: film actress; radio personality; Politician Film producer Content creator
- Years active: 2000–present
- Known for: Jenifa, Omo Ghetto, Love and New Notes

Eniola Badmus is a Nigerian professional film actress, script writer, entertainer and a social media influencer. She is presently the Special Assistant to the Speaker of the Nigerian House of Representatives on Social Events and Public Hearings.

She came into the limelight in 2008 after she was featured in the movie Jenifa.

== Early life and education ==
Badmus was born in Ijebu Ode, Nigeria and she had her basic and secondary school education in Ijebu Ode. She proceeded to the University of Ibadan where she studied Theatre Arts and then Lagos State University where she graduated with an M.Sc degree in economics.

== Career ==
Badmus' career in acting professions started in the year 2000 but came into limelight in 2008 when she shot to recognition starring in two Yoruba films titled Jenifa and Omo Ghetto. Both movies were instrumental to her rise in Nigeria entertainment industry which has since seen her star as both lead and supporting actress in several Yoruba and English films.

== Filmography ==
=== Selected filmography ===
- Jenifa (2008) as Gbogbo Big Girl
- Angelina (2013) as Ogadinma
- Village Babes
- Oreke Temi (2009) as Madam Cash
- Blackberry Babes (2011) as Apolonia
- Mr. & Mrs Ibu
- Wicked Step-mother
- Child Seller
- Adun Ewuro
- Visa Lottery (2015)
- Ojukwu the War Lord
- Police Academy
- Not My Queen
- Battle for Justice
- Miss Fashion
- Eefa
- Omo Esu
- Black Val (2016)
- GhettoBred (2018) as Efe
- Househelp
- Karma
- Big Offer
- Omo-Ghetto (2010) as Busty
- Ijewuru (2012)
- Daluchi
- Funke (2018) as Mrs. Wale
- Miracle (2019)
- The-Spell (2018)
- Oshaprapra
- Omo ghetto the saga (2020) as Busty
- Akpe: Return of the Beast (2020)
- One Lagos Night (2021) as Uloma
- Swallow (2021) as Mrs. Durojaiye
- Tiger's Tail (2022) as Kike
- Dawn at Midnight (2022) as Bisi
- Palava! (2022) as Iya Oloja
- Gangs of Lagos (2023) as Isale Eko Woman

== Endorsement deal ==
In March 2016, Eniola was unveiled as a brand ambassador for telecommunication company 9mobile. She has also served as a brand ambassador for Western Lotto, Indomie and Peak milk.

== Awards and nominations ==
Year	Award ceremony	Prize	Result	Ref	Note
2010	2010 Best of Nollywood Awards	Best Actress in a Supporting Role	Nominated		—
2011	2011 Best of Nollywood Awards	Best Actress in a Leading Role (Yoruba)	Nominated		—
2011	2011 Best of Nollywood Awards	Best Crossover in a Film	Won		—
2012	2012 Best of Nollywood Awards	Best Supporting Actress in a Yoruba film	Nominated		—
2014	City People Entertainment Awards 2014	Best Actress of the Year (Yoruba)	Won		—
2014	2014 Golden Icons Academy Movie Awards	Best Comedic Act	Nominated		—
2015	2015 Golden Icons Academy Movie Awards	Best Comedic Act	Won		with Akpororo
2015	2015 Black Entertainment Film Fashion Television and Arts	Best Actress in Africa	Won		—

Best movie Actress City People 2017 Best actress 2018 (Plus size African fashion week)

== See also ==
- List of Yoruba people
