= JJC Skillz =

Nigerian songwriter, rapper, record and television producer

Abdulrasheed Bello
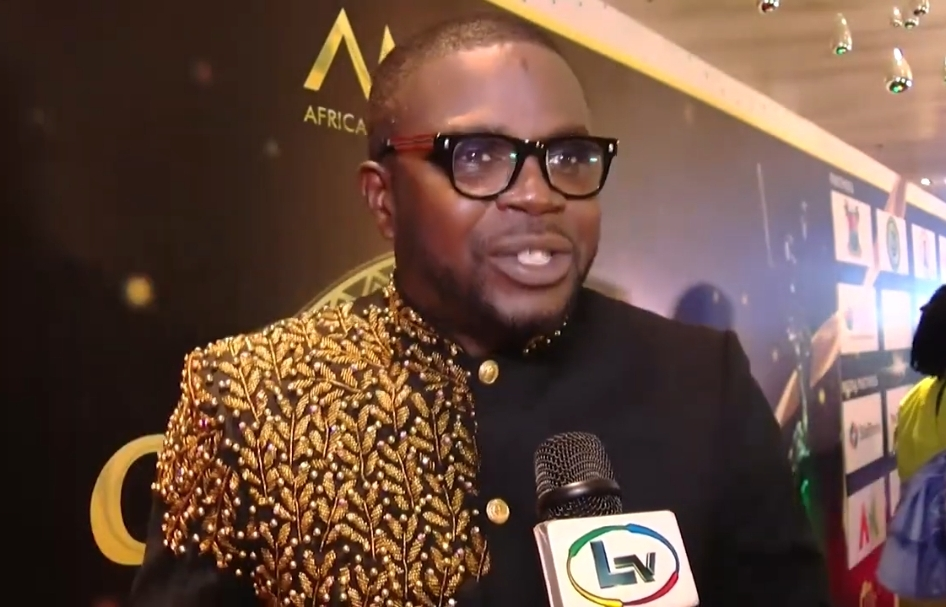
- JJC Skillz in 2021

Background information
- Born: Abdulrasheed Bello; 4 April 1977 (age 49); Kano State, Nigeria
- Genres: Hip hop; Afrobeats; Nigerian hip hop
- Occupations: Rapper; singer; songwriter; record producer; television producer; director
- Instrument: Vocals
- Years active: 2002–present

Abdulrasheed Bello (born 4 April 1977, Kano) known professionally as Skillz or JJC Skillz is a Nigerian rapper, singer, songwriter, record producer, and television producer.

JJC Skillz earned recognition in Nigeria after the release of one of his singles, "We Are Africans," an afrobeats anthem. Prior to the success of "We are Africans," Skillz was producer for the British hip-hop record company and musical group Big Brovaz. In December 2002, he released his debut album, Atide, an experimental album with lyrics in English and Nigerian languages and influenced by hip hop, African, and salsa musical styles.

He co-produced with his ex-wife, Funke Akindele Industreet, a television show about the Nigerian music industry.

== Career ==
Bello was born in Kano and left Nigeria for U.K. when he was fourteen years old. He developed an intense respect and appreciation of music, little by little, from his father's country music records and juju music. In the U.K., he was drawn to hip-hop music and soon formed a musical group with a friend; thereafter, they began performing at talent shows. His stage name, JJC, means Johnny Just Come, a term used by Nigerians to describe naive new arrivals to a city. Bello's first major producing project was co-founding Big Brovas Records and Big Brovas Collective. In 2004, he released Atide, his debut album with 419 squad. His producing credits include Weird MC's Ijoya, Pu Yanga by Tillaman, and Morile by Buoqui.

He also came to the African music scene, creating projects like Afropean (Afro-European fusion) and Afrobeats.

In 2013, he won the best international artist at the Nigerian entertainment award. He created an African super group called the JJC and the 419 squad. This group won the Kora All African music award in 2014.

== Personal life ==
Before his marriage to Akindele, Bello fathered three children from three different mothers. He married Funke Akindele in 2016. In 2018, the couple gave birth to a set of twins.

In June 2022, Bello announced on his Instagram that the couple had decided to pursue their lives separately.

The music producer secretly married an Ebira bride in Kano state in March 2023.
