= Lebanese Nigerians =

Nigerians of Lebanese origin

Lebanese people in Nigeria نيجيريون لبنانيون
Total population
- 30,000 – 100,000

Regions with significant populations
- Throughout urban Nigeria; In particular Abuja, Ibadan, Jos, Kano, Kaduna, Lagos, Sokoto, and Port Harcourt

Languages
- Predominantly; Arabic (Lebanese) · English (Nigerian, Pidgin); Others; French · Hausa · Yoruba in addition to other Nigerian languages

Religion
- Christianity (Maronite, Greek Orthodox, Melkite, and Protestant) · Islam (Shia and Sunni) · Druze

Related ethnic groups
- Lebanese diaspora (Lebanese Ghanaians, Lebanese Ivorians, Lebanese Senegalese, Lebanese Sierra Leoneans)

Lebanese Nigerians (Arabic: نيجيريون لبنانيون) are Nigerians with Lebanese ancestry, including Lebanon-born immigrants to Nigeria. Also known as Levantine Nigerians, some of the community have ancestry originating from other areas of the Levant and the broader Arab world. With a population approximated between 30,000 and 100,000, the group form one of the largest communities originally from outside Nigeria.

Lebanese immigration to Nigeria started in the late nineteenth century, with migration from Ottoman Syria to the protectorates that later formed British Nigeria. The immigration — mainly from Lebanon but also from other parts of the Lebanese diaspora in West Africa — increased in the early twentieth century after the end of the first World War, being concentrated first in Lagos then in other urban areas throughout colonial Nigeria. While some Lebanese Nigerians have left Nigeria — either permanently or temporarily for education or work — and reduced the original community's size, the further waves of immigration to Nigeria occurring amid the Lebanese Civil War and ongoing Lebanese liquidity crisis have added to the community since the late twentieth century.

== Identity ==
During the first waves of Lebanese immigration to Nigeria (and West Africa more generally), modern-day Lebanon comprised part of Ottoman Syria and later the French mandate; due to this political situation, early Lebanese immigrants were grouped together with immigrants from Syria and denoted as "Syrians" in colonial reports and some pre-independence literature. In other sources, the community were known under different terms — Arabs, Lebanese, Syrians from Mount Lebanon, and Turks.

By the mid-twentieth century, "Lebanese" replaced "Syrian" as the predominant identification term for the community. Alternatively, some communities (especially in French West Africa) used variants of "Libano-Syrian" as to include the Syrian community while other sources used and continue to use "Levantine" or "Syro-Lebanese" as umbrella terms.

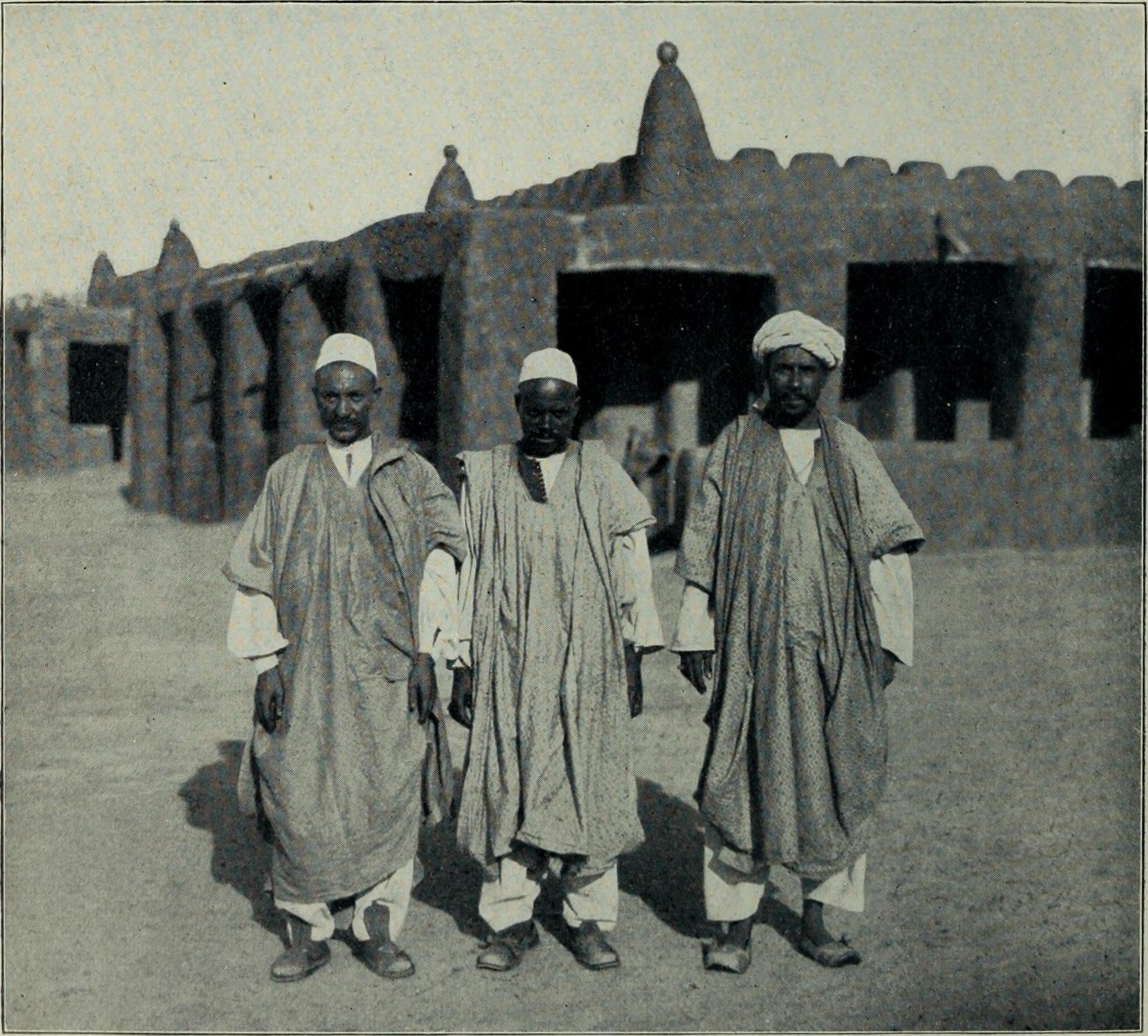
Tripolitans — who often entered the Lebanese community — in Dikwa, now-Borno State in 1913

Additionally, immigrants from other parts of the Arab world — including modern Libya, Morocco, and Yemen — often entered into the community, particularly traders from Tripolitania with longtime economic connections with northern Nigeria. A prominent example was Saul Raccah, a Tripolitanian Jewish businessman who immigrated to Kano in 1914, married into a Lebanese Kanoan family, and became a "pillar" of Kano's Levantine community. Estimates from the 1960s approximate that 3% of the community originate from modern Syria with the remainder coming from either Lebanon or other parts of the Arab world. Alternatively, some other early Arab immigrants from Egypt, Libya, Sudan, and Yemen assimilated into indigenous northern Nigerian identities, particularly in Kano. Abdalla Uba Adamu cites religion as a key differentiator as most migrants from North Africa and Yemen shared a common religious affiliation of Sunni Islam with the majority of indigenous northern Nigerians while Levantine migrants were overwhelmingly Christian or Shia Muslim. By the end of the twentieth century, newcomers entered the "Levantine" community from Kuwait and Iraq after the Gulf War — some of whom were relatives of earlier immigrants.

Research notes the relative lack of cohesion in the Lebanese community in the first half of the twentieth century, with internal divides based on ideological, religious, sectarian, and subethnic differences. However, there were some collective organisations — such as the Lebanese Union of Nigeria, largely formed to lobby colonial officials and indigenous chiefs on the community's behalf — which became the precursors to modern Lebanese Nigerian civil society and identity. Also, mid-twentieth century scholars noted that the Levantine community had greater social cohesion than the contemporary European population. In post-independence Nigeria, Lebanese identity formed amid racialization, communal tensions, and community-building.

A recurring feature of Lebanese Nigerian identity has been the community's ambiguous position in the Nigerian racial and social hierarchy. During the colonial period, the Lebanese were distinguished from both Europeans and Africans with the early Pidgin term for the community being "bush White men" — a label that reflected their perceived social inferiority to British colonists despite their light skin. As the Lebanese community grew in economic importance, prominent Lebanese figures were invited to official government receptions alongside prominent indigenous Africans, but neither group received fall social acceptance by the European establishment. Scholars described Lebanese West African identity as a "third force" between the indigenous African and the European colonial population, with community members characterizing their position as the "hyphen" between the Africans and the Europeans. This intermediary positioning had a direct economic dimension with the Lebanese traders often occupying a commercial position between the European and indigenous traders, at times competing with and working with either or both groups. This unique position remained after independence, with Lebanese Nigerian writer Nisreen Kaj noting that the community's role as a non-Black identity has been a source of tension within the focus of Nigerian society and governance on indigeneity and, implicitly, race. Kaj compared the situation to dynamics documented by Mahmood Mamdani and other scholars on race in post-colonial Africa.

== History ==
=== Colonial era ===
==== Initial migration ====
Their choice [to migrate to West Africa] was also affected by their financial position. Almost all these emigrants were members of large, poor families. Each in raising money for his voyage had exhausted all the family's savings, had sold personal belongings, or borrowed money. All the family sacrificed in the hope that the one member emigrating would be able to collect a fortune and send remittances to allow them an easier and better life. An emigrant contemplating return [to Lebanon] from Marseilles had to think of all these facts and the disillusionment and disappointment he would cause to all his family...they decided it was easier to face [West Africa] than their hungry families, and disgrace in their country.

— Lebanese West African writer Marwan Hanna, West Africa (26 April 1958)

People from Lebanon first migrated to West Africa in the nineteenth century amid a wave of emigration to flee oppression and economic crisis in the Ottoman Empire. Many of these early emigrants were members of impoverished families who often used family savings or borrowed money to fund the voyage in the hope that the emigrating family member would send back remittances. Lebanese migrants often originally intended to reach Brazil or the United States, but many ended up in West Africa due to several factors — trips to West Africa were significantly less expensive than transatlantic fares, immigration health requirements for West African ports were less strident than ports in the United States, and no travel documents were required upon arrival in West Africa. French shipping lines serving the region were also eager for business and presented West Africa favourably to prospective passengers in Marseille, which served as a transit point for most Lebanese emigrants. Some Lebanese migrants to West Africa mistakenly believed they had traveled to a vague geographic region called "Amerka" (misspelling of "America"), due to either misunderstanding or deception by ship captains. In particular, Nigeria received a significant amount of Lebanese settlers due to the coastal city of Lagos serving as a major point of transit between Lebanon and the Americas.

Reportedly, the first Lebanese immigrant to Nigeria was Elias Khoury (Ilyās al-Khūrī), a Maronite originally from the village of Miziara, who migrated to Lagos from Sierra Leone between 1886 and 1890. More Lebanese migrants moved to Lagos in the following years, with some soon moving on to new areas: two or three years after their initial landing in Lagos, Lebanese migrants arrived in Ibadan in the early 1890s. In 1898, one of the earliest Lebanese immigrants — Michael Elias (Mikhā'īl Ilyās) — took a caravan from Lagos through Kano and Bornu to settle near Lake Chad. Another Maronite from Miziara, Yūsuf Bishārah, settled in Kano in 1900 — three years before the British occupation.

==== Settlement patterns ====
Early immigration was organised mainly along family and local lines with new migrants joining their relatives and people from the same part of Lebanon, often congregating in the same areas in Nigeria. Many of these early Lebanese migrants to Nigeria came from the villages of Miziara and Jwaya. An estimate from the Lebanese consul in Lagos in the 1960s put the share of the Lebanese community coming from Miziara at approximately 25% and from Jwaya at approximately 33%. The two villages continue to rely on remittances from Lebanese Nigerians into the modern era.

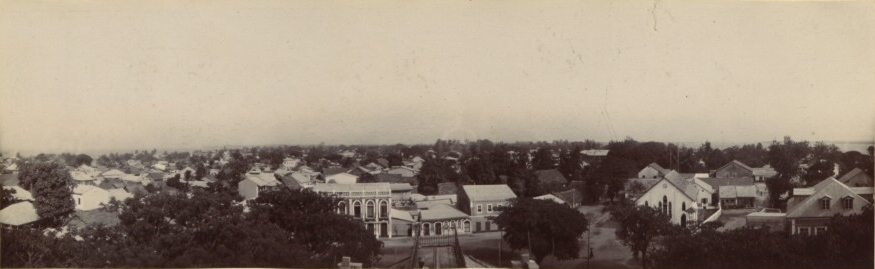
Lagos around 1910

In Nigeria, the first place of settlement was Lagos as it was the port of arrival for migrants and the seat of colonial administration. However, the consolidation of colonial rule and infrastructural improvements facilitated the expansion of the Lebanese community into the rest of modern Nigeria.

The Lebanese community were noted in Ibadan around 1910 while Lebanese traders entered Jebba, Lokoja, and Osogbo during the First World War, and Benin City and Sapele in 1919. As the first Lebanese migrants typically were traders, the community did not expand to small towns — which were viewed as areas with little opportunity for commerce — until around 1920. In the 1920s, southwestern Lebanese traders consolidated their activities in Benin City, Lagos, Ibadan, Osogbo, and Sapele. Historian Toyin Falola described the traders' tactic of settling a town viewed as a "metropole of trade" and then operating in the outlying areas by hawking with lorries or hiring indigenous agents.

Although they failed to settle in some places — often being blocked by competing merchants — such as Abeokuta, Ijebu Ode, and Ifẹ, small Lebanese communities were successfully established in Benin, Ilesa, and Ondo districts by the 1930s. Moreover, in cities established or greatly expanded during the colonization, the Levantine community was placed into commercial life and geography from the beginning. In the tin mining boomtown of Jos, Levantine migrants were put directly into the segregated urban structure with the creation of a Syrian area alongside neighborhoods populated by Europeans, southern non-indigenes, and Hausa non-indigenes. In places where traders were denied admission in the 1930s, the Lebanese continued to lobby chiefs and officials. Arguing that their goods provided a service to the general population, previous denials were sometimes overturned — most notably in Ijebu Ode in 1950.

Historians find it difficult to reconstruct population data on Lebanese Nigerians in this era as accurate enumeration was hampered by a lack of reliable national census data before 1931, the community's reported tendency to avoid disclosing the correct number of their wives and children, and the periodic inclusion of returnees in "new arrival" figures.

==== Competition and ethnic tensions ====
The expansion of Lebanese merchants in the 1920s and 1930s preceded both conflict and collaboration between the community and other traders — indigenous Nigerians and Europeans. In localities where the Lebanese businessmen were allowed to operate, they often became prominent retailers and semi-wholesalers. The indigenous traders operating in these communities either competed with the Lebanese traders, worked with the Lebanese traders, were hired as agents for the Lebanese traders, or moved their activities to the peripheries of the towns or neighbouring villages, sometimes having to rely on the European and Lebanese traders for their supplies. On the other hand, European firms avoided disputes with Lebanese traders until Lebanese businesses began to expand to European-dominated wholesaling in the 1930s. After the expansions, European traders competed with Lebanese migrants, with researchers questioning if Europeans attempted to instigate resentment between the Lebanese and indigenous populations. After "Syrian" traders — most prominently, businessman Saul Raccah (Note: Although Saul Raccah was a Tripolitanian Jewish immigrant, Raccah married into a Lebanese Kanoan family and was considered a "pillar" of Kano's Levantine community.) — began to compete with European traders in Kano's groundnut trade, European firms "tried to have the colonial state abolish the native produce market in which indigenous traders sold groundnuts to the Syrians" in an "attack of the more or less united European firms on the Syrian and African middlemen” during the interwar period. European firms also resorted to price fixing arrangements to block Levantine competitors and force indigenous producers to sell at lower prices, ultimately pushing the colonial administration to form the Nigerian marketing boards. Raccah, along with Levantine and indigenous partners, eventually broke the groundnut oligopsony of European firms in Kano.

However, press documented indigenous frustration with unequal commercial competition during this period at times when European and Lebanese businesses worked together. The African Messenger newspaper described the situation as indigenous traders squeezed by European and Lebanese businesses, which researchers noted received preferential access to credit from European banks that was often denied to African businesses.

Lobbying by non-Lebanese traders limited the expansion of the community, being the main cause of restrictions on Lebanese businesses. The denial of Lebanese trader admission into Ijebu Ode came after the Ijebu Traders Union protested to Awujale Daniel Adesanya Gbelegbuwa II in 1938, arguing that they did not oppose Lebanese settlement but the community's traders could form a monopoly through their connections with other Lebanese merchants in Lagos who already controlled the Lagos-Ijebu Ode wholesale market. The Ijebu Traders Union also argued that Lebanese businesses tended not to hire indigenous workers or purchase local products, winning the support of many chiefs and the Acting Resident to block Lebanese trade in the city. Similarly, women textile dealers petitioned the Olubadan-in-Council in 1938 to criticise their Lebanese competitors for predatory pricing amidst a "bitter trade rivalry" in villages around the Ibadan area. The chiefs ruled in the petition's favour by prohibiting the activities of the Lebanese dealers and their agents in the villages.

Aside from competing traders, elite West African resentment toward the Lebanese presence started as early as the 1920s, with a resolution at a meeting of the National Congress of British West Africa calling for Lebanese repatriation as "undesirables and a menace to the good government of the land."

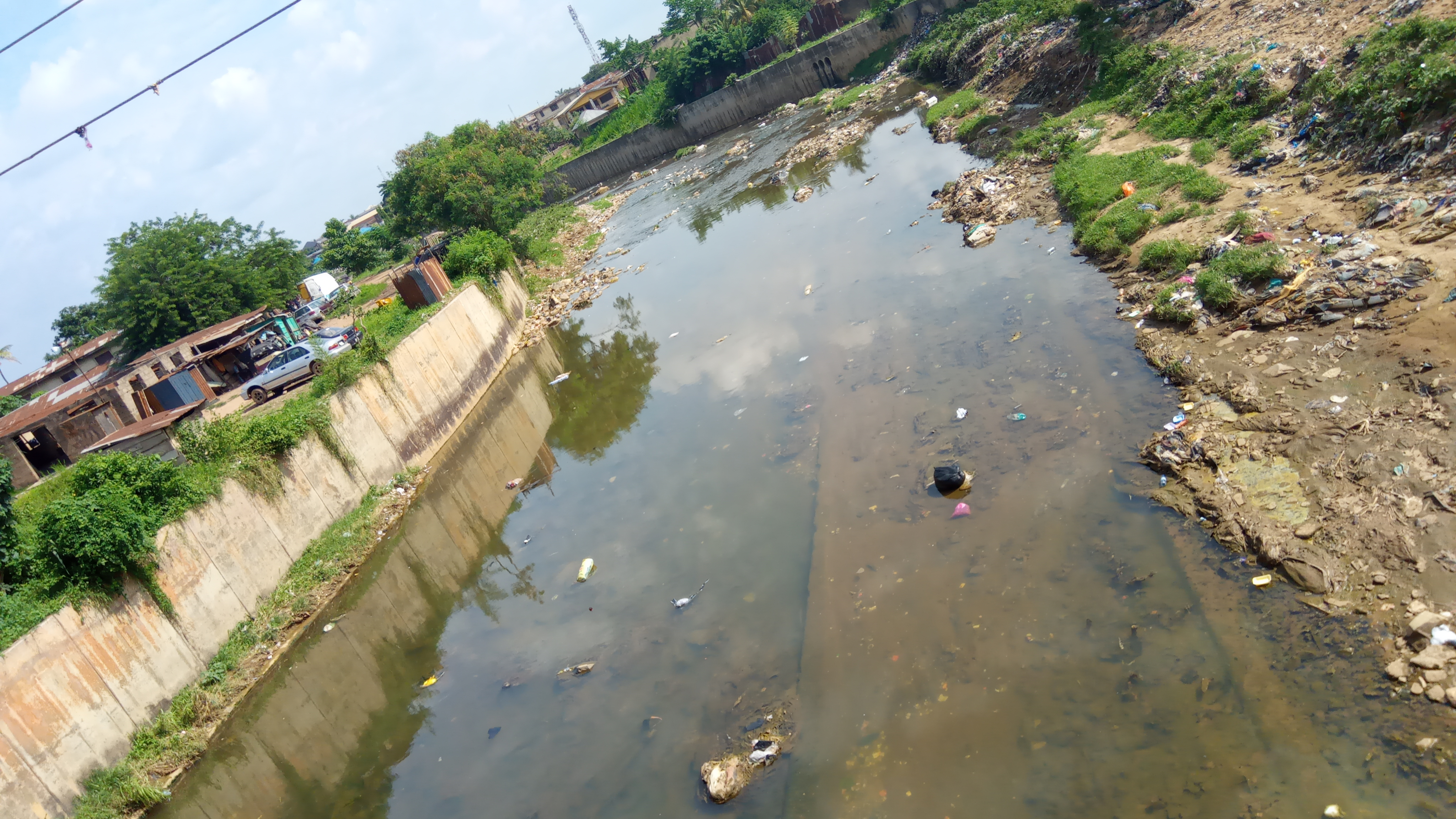
The Ogunpa River, the northernmost limit of Lebanese stores in mid-twentieth century Ibadan

The 1930s were not entirely a period of prevention of Lebanese expansion as there was an extensive debate in Abeokuta in 1938, which ultimately approved Lebanese businesses. The anti-Lebanese group — mostly traders — pushed an argument that Lebanese admission would be detrimental to the interest of the economy, cause unemployment, and solely benefit European firms. On the other hand, there was a pro-Lebanese group made up of chiefs, landlords, and professionals who anticipated potential benefits from the Lebanese presence and argued that the new businesses would reduce unemployment. The pro-Lebanese group eventually won before the Egba Council in June 1938, but with measures to limit Lebanese business activities to shops and stores. These compromises of allowing restricted business activity were also reached elsewhere, with the Native Authority in Ibadan barring Lebanese shops from north of the Ogunpa River.

==== Community organisation and restrictions ====
In the first half of the twentieth century, there were also disputes between the Lebanese community and the press along with nationalist politicians. Falola described a series of Daily Times and African Herald articles in mid-1928 accusing Lebanese migrants of "racism (because of their limited interactions with Nigerians), exploitation (because of their attitude to their workers and low pay), and fraud (because they sold 'rubbish of the lowest possible quality')." Pieces in the Nigerian Tribune — closely linked to the Action Group, a party with a base among indigenous traders — also targeted the Lebanese community, notably after a Lebanese trader violated Ibadan's restrictions by attempting to found a store north of the Ogunpa River in 1950.

These periods of tension prompted increased community cohesion and organisation. The articles in 1928 led to one of the first recorded instances of Lebanese Nigerian organising when the community put together a delegation to express their concerns to Governor Graeme Thomson, who assured their safety; the community also sponsored counter-articles. Formal organisations were formed in the that decade, with the catch-all Lebanese Union of Nigeria as the most prominent along with groups organised along religious lines (such as the Lebanese Christian Association) or trade lines (such as the Lebanese Transport Union). The Lebanese Union typically was the group to approach the government on behalf of the entire community. When anti-Lebanese sentiment was high in 1938, the union pushed chiefs to minimise tensions, warned Lebanese to be more careful, and appealed to colonial officials to help discipline Lebanese businessmen who used unethical trading methods in an attempt to ease tensions. The union also forged relationship with chiefs and sought out the colonial government on other matters: in 1939, the union petitioned Governor Bernard Henry Bourdillon for the release of a Lebanese Nigerian's German husband, who had been interned in Ibadan as an "enemy alien" after the start of World War II. Additionally, several Lebanese Nigerians attempted to undergo naturalisation for themselves and their children but it was a slow and difficult process. Even second-generation, Nigeria-born Lebanese lacked stable status as the legal definition of a national in British West Africa — a person who was a British subject and a member of a community settled in the territory that was not of "European or Asiatic origin" — excluded Lebanese regardless of birthplace or length of residence.

West African Pilot front page (10 June 1954) with Nigerian appointees from the 1954 Birthday Honours, including Levantine community member Saul Raccah

By the middle of the twentieth century, scholars documented that geographic pattern of Lebanese Nigerians broadly mirrored economic geography. The 1952 Census recorded significant "Syrian" populations in commercial centers, such as Kano Province, Lagos, and Plateau Province. In Kano Province and Bornu Division, the Levantine communities outnumbered the European population while in Jos township, the group was only slightly smaller in number than the European community. On the other hand, the Middle Belt (excluding Plateau Province) contained an "other non-native" total of only 25, which scholars regarded as a sign of the region's underdeveloped commercial sector.

In the 1940s and 1950s, questions about the Lebanese community and its members' businesses were the subject of political debates. In 1947, a boycott of European firms was organised in Ibadan in protest of the distribution of consumer goods, especially textiles, which was seen as favouring Lebanese traders; the Ibadan Lebanese traders' close operational ties with the European companies made them a secondary focus of anti-colonial economic grievances. In a 1950 speech to the Legislative Council, Adeola Odutola argued that Levantine transport firms failed to reinvest profits in Nigeria after displacing indigenous businesses from the sector through collusion with European companies. In 1953, Action Group MP Sule Oyeshola Gbadamosi used a parliamentary speech to attack the "disgraceful activities" of Lebanese merchants in land and business transactions, stating that "any foreigner who under the canopy of a foreign rule employs anti-social methods to deprive our people of their lands, may regret their conduct after [expected year of independence] 1958." Ladoke Akintola — another Action Group MP and future Premier of Western Nigeria — called for a commission to inquire into the business activities of "all aliens" in real estate, transport, and mining, and specifically labeling his targets as "sleek Syrians and the grabbing Lebanese." On the other side, some political figures defended the Lebanese community, including NCNC MP Kola Balogun. These parliamentary debates and supportive media coverage led to an increase in anti-Lebanese sentiment.

Amidst the commercial and ethnic divides, the colonial administration attempted to make policy that officials thought would not disrupt trade or create an environment for ethnic violence. Falola noted that "whenever [Lebanese] were attacked by Nigerians, the government always took the position that these [attacks] were 'uninformed and unjustifiable.'" In response to complaints by chiefs, the administration noted that authorities had no power to expel the Lebanese from their communities, although restrictions on their businesses were permitted. Colonial officials also had an "official belief in the loyalty" of Lebanese migrants to the authorities, with the Commissioner of the Colony in Lagos writing that the Lebanese community's "public spirit and expressions of loyalty to the Empire are well known" in October 1936. Government officials formally thanked Lebanese organisations for support and certain Lebanese community members were named to boards or consulted on trade policy. In Kano, Raccah became a member of the Kano Provincial Development Committee and was appointed Member of the Most Excellent Order of the British Empire in the 1954 Birthday Honours for "public services in Nigeria."

Nonetheless, colonial officials also lowered Lebanese immigration and limited naturalisation. Directives in the 1920s aimed to limit migration by blocking migrants "who are likely to become destitute and a consequent charge on public funds" or "who are likely to conduct themselves so as to endanger the peace and good order" from settling in colonial Nigeria. Further policy shifts in the 1940s and 1950s established restrictions on trade for non-indigenes — several regulations enacted "with the specific idea of excluding Lebanese" — and preferenced professionals over traders in immigration. Despite a large number of applicants, only sixteen Lebanese Nigerians had been granted Nigerian naturalisation by 1959. The constitution of independent Nigeria subsequently made provision for naturalisation, particularly for Nigeria-born residents who applied before 1962 but did not automatically grant citizenship to Nigeria-born residents.

Lebanese Nigerian population estimates (1950s and 1960s)
City	Total
Lagos	1,500
Kano	1,000
Ibadan	500
Jos	300
Zaria	200
Gusau	100
Maiduguri	100
Port Harcourt	100
Sokoto	100
Calabar	50 or 36
Enugu	50
Benin City	20
Kaduna	20

It remained difficult to get complete population data for Lebanese Nigerians in this era, but mid-twentieth century estimates indicate the community's concentration in major cities. The Lebanese government's count at the same period was about 6,150 while the Lebanese consul in Lagos estimated 5,000-6,000; the colonial Nigerian government's statistics department, counting only foreign-born individuals, produced much lower figures of approximately 1,250 Lebanese and 100 Syrians in 1959. These divergences reflect the persistent difficulties of enumeration: whether to count locally-born children of immigrants, the tendency of community members to avoid official disclosure, and different methodologies between government sources. This opacity continues into the modern era as Nigeria does not publish racial or ethnic census data.

=== Independence and indigenisation policies ===
Nigeria gained independence from Britain on 1 October 1960, and the formal diplomatic relationship between Lebanon and Nigeria was established in 1962. While independence brought opportunities, it also introduced new pressures on the Lebanese community as successive Nigerian governments sought to increase indigenous economic participation and renewed scrutiny of the Lebanese community's economic role. Nationalist discourse — drawing on Pan-Africanist ideology, particularly the "Africa for Africans" philosophies of Edward Wilmot Blyden and Marcus Garvey — framed the Lebanese as an auxiliary presence to colonialism. In addition, criticism of Levantine business practices continued from competitors, politicians, unions, and workers. Members of the Levantine community often responded to the criticisms in the press.

Immediately prior to and following independence, the Lebanese community remained in its societal position between the indigenous and European populations. Warren T. Morrill's 1962 anthropological study of the Lebanese community in Calabar showed one of the earliest detailed accounts of a single Lebanese community in Nigeria. At its peak, the Calabar community numbered over 100 individuals, almost all from three families originating from the same Lebanese village; by 1958, the community had shrunk due to the relative economic decline of Calabar and resulting emigration to other Nigerian cities. Morrill documented that the Lebanese in Calabar found themselves occupying the same ambiguous social position — notably, avoiding the overwhelmingly-European Old Calabar Club while helping fund and establish the competing African Club with indigenes and some Europeans — and were adapting their cultural practices (including cuisine, language, and religious observance) in response to both the indigenous and European social environments. Similar dynamics surrounding private members' clubs were observed elsewhere, with the Zaria Lebanese Club — which was predominantly Levantine but open to all residents — being founded in response to another club's Europeans-only policy.

The Nigerian Enterprises Promotion Decree in 1972 and its successor legislation in 1977 — collectively known as the indigenisation decrees — required foreign-owned businesses to transfer majority equity to Nigerian citizens across a range of sectors. The indigenisation decrees mandated Lebanese Nigerian business owners — along those in the Greek and Indian communities — without Nigerian citizenship to either transfer significant equity stakes to indigenous Nigerian partners or exit targeted sectors. Lebanese Nigerian businessman Anwar M. El-Khalil, who was serving as President of the World Lebanese Cultural Union in 1972, pushed for the community to be "realistic" in response to the decrees to ensure smooth transfers of ownership while Levantine groups sent delegations to meet with government officeholders. Although the proposed policy was adapted, scores of Lebanese residents without Nigerian citizenship left Nigeria in the months before indigenisation came into force in 1974; others communicated that they would comply with the decree or applied for naturalisation.

The policy's effectiveness was contested as some scholars argue that while indigenisation redirected foreign investment, it did not have a corresponding impact on the labour employed in industry nor remove most non-indigenous Nigerians from company ownership, noting that non-indigenous moguls continued to own many top companies by 1979. For Lebanese Nigerians, the post-indigenisation period also had mixed effects as some businesspeople adapted by taking on indigenous business partners or obtaining Nigerian citizenship, while others reduced their business operations.

The decrees had the largest impact on smaller Lebanese-dominated enterprises — cinemas, textiles, and transport — rather than medium or large industrial companies, where Lebanese traders generally remained through share dilution rather than outright sale. In Kano's textile market, the centre of the northern textile trade, over 100 buildings were sold by Lebanese owners to indigenous businessmen for more than ₦10 million in the early 1970s following the first decree, yet research from the end of the 1980s showed that the Lebanese Nigerian businessmen had retained an important share of wholesale and retail textile trading. A similar phenomenon was observed in Kano's manufacturing industry where the decrees nominally shifted control as indigenous investors held majority equity in most Kano manufacturing firms surveyed by researchers in April 1985; however, Levantine manufacturers often retained operational control and significant management alongside indigenous partners in these joint ventures. The Levantine-controlled firms also continued to dominate sub-sectors such as plastics, textiles, and soft drinks despite the de jure equity redistribution mandated by indigenisation. For these larger Lebanese firms with financial strength and strong ties to other companies, indigenisation was labeled as a "dead letter" by author Tom G. Forrest.

The Lebanese Civil War brought a fresh wave of immigrants to Nigeria due to internal displacement and economic disruption driving emigration to established diaspora communities around the world. Nigeria's oil boom and growing consumer economy made it an attractive destination. After the war, advances in telecommunications — and later the internet — in the 1990s enabled the maintenance of close ties with Lebanon and with other West African Lebanese communities that helped with business coordination, cultural continuity, and remittances.

=== Contemporary era ===
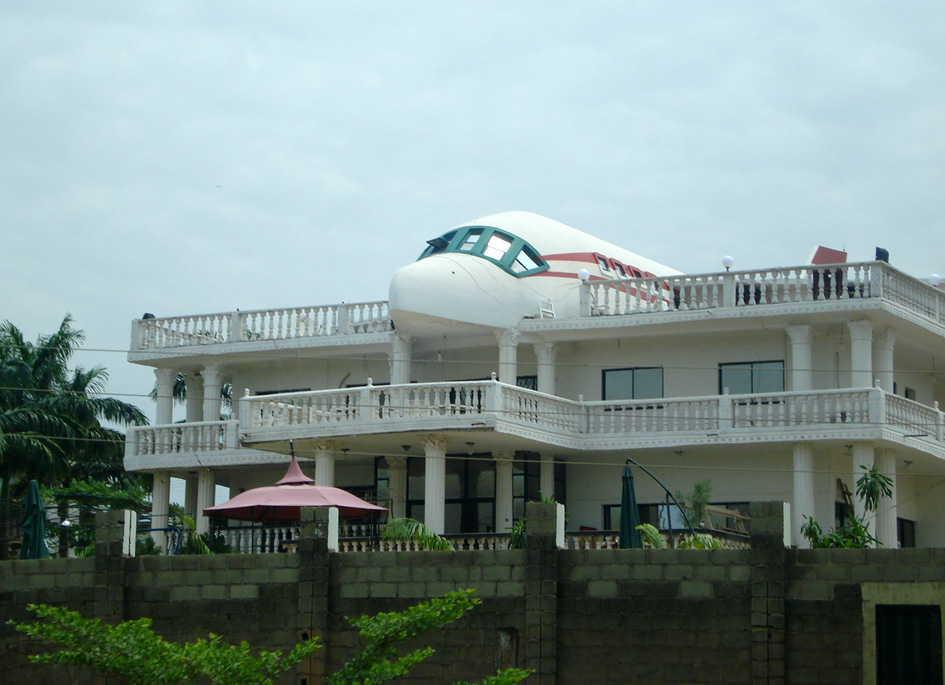
Abuja Airplane House, an Abuja landmark owned and constructed by a Lebanese Nigerian family

Nigeria continues to receive a significant influx of Lebanese immigrants seeking to escape political and economic turmoil in Lebanon. In 2008, records from the Nigeria Immigration Service put the Lebanese population of Nigeria at 30,000, many of whom were third-generation Lebanese-Nigerians with Nigerian citizenship. However, other estimates put the Lebanese-Nigerians population at over 100,000 at the end of 2003.

In 2012, a study of the Lebanese community in Ibadan found a similar socio-economic position as previous community studies. Rasheed Oyewole Olaniyi and Oluwasegun Michael Ajayi of the University of Ibadan found that Ibadan's Lebanese community was primarily engaged in business and had a complicated relationship with indigenous Nigerians.

The Lebanese migration to Nigeria shifted in the recent decades. While earlier waves consisted largely of poorer migrants, more recent immigrants are more likely to be people with already-established family, business, and political ties. The Lebanese financial crisis beginning in 2019 has driven additional emigration. There is also ongoing Lebanese naturalisation, with citizens of Lebanon comprising large shares of naturalised citizens through to the 2020s.

== Socioeconomics ==
The Lebanese Nigerian community has been economically significant since the early twentieth century, occupying a position as middlemen between European firms and indigenous consumers during the colonial era, and subsequently as business owners and investors in independent Nigeria. Currently Lebanese Nigerians are key figures in Nigeria's agriculture, construction, entertainment, manufacturing, and retail sectors.

Researchers note several social and structural factors as having facilitated Lebanese Nigerian economic prominence. Historians and contemporary accounts found Levantine firms had access to credit from European banks that was unavailable to indigenous businesses. The prevalence of family-based business model — termed "utilitarian familialism" — allowed for the collection of resources and minimisation of overhead costs. International ties with other Lebanese communities enabled Lebanese Nigerian businesses to obtain foreign exchange and knowledge of the international financial system more easily than their indigenous Nigerian counterparts.

=== Business ===
The earliest Lebanese commercial activities in Nigeria were small-scale. Many of the first immigrants sold trinkets and cheap textiles — often door to door or on a street corner. An eyewitness account from the early period described Lebanese merchandise as "a collection of odds and ends consisting of cheap beads and other junk which they peddled about." Lebanese West African writer Marwan Hanna noted how these traders received the nickname "coral men" due to their hawking of imitation coral beads. This trade was occasionally supplemented with street singing and musical performances. As businesses grew, the hawkers moved into fixed retail shops and later into semi-wholesale, eventually becoming significant actors in the cocoa and palm kernel trade in southwestern Nigeria.

Analysis of the colonial period's business environment found Lebanese Nigerian merchants tended to quickly respond to economic changes, becoming some of the first businesses to cater for the interests of the emerging Nigerian middle class. In addition, Lebanese traders had far more direct and sustained contact with customers than their European competitors, developing relationships that enabled them to better understand consumer preferences and credit — often in indigenous languages. However, Levantine traders also had a key structural advantage during the period through access to credit from European banks, which historians identify as a major source of their competitive edge over indigenous businessmen. The Bank of British West Africa and other European colonial banks preferred lending to Levantine and European trading firms while simultaneously denying credit to African borrowers — who protested, rejecting claims that they lacked adequate collateral and noting the banks lent money from deposits predominantly made by Africans. This unequal system allowed Lebanese traders in Nigeria to borrow capital comparable to their European counterparts in the trading sector and, through these connections with European banking institutions, gradually overtake African competitors in several areas of the economy during the 1920s and 1930s.

After independence, Lebanese Nigerians diversified into more industries. Since the 1980s, Lebanese community members moved their investments into industrial production across many sectors of the Nigerian economy, establishing what researchers describe as "remarkable business empires."

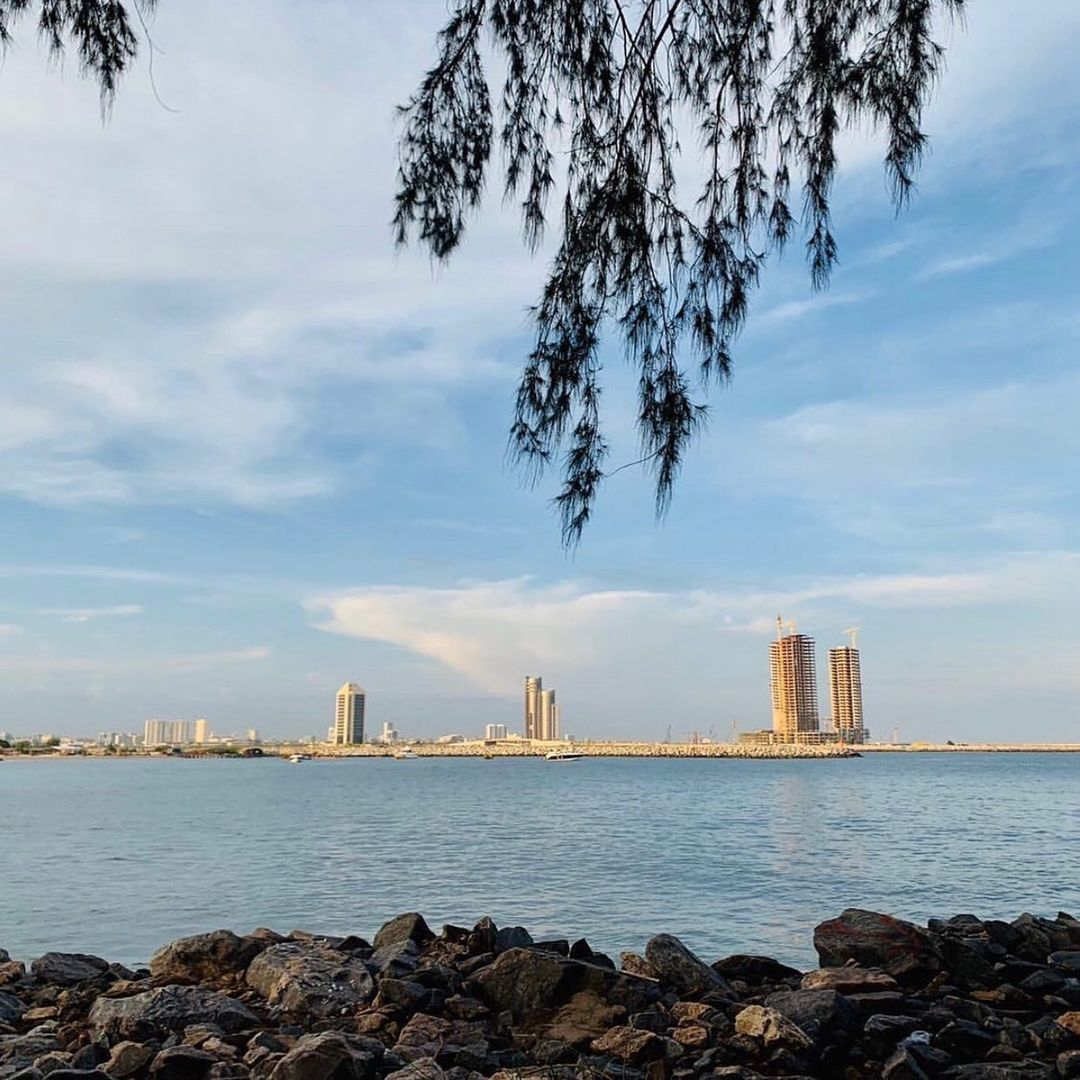
Eko Atlantic, the Lagosian planned community developed by the Lebanese Nigerian-owned Chagoury Group

The introduction of Nigeria's Structural Adjustment Programme in 1986 accelerated the shift as Lebanese Nigerian business owners — reportedly due to their understanding of both the international financial system and the political and economic landscape of Nigeria — were among the first group to take advantage of liberalisation. In the following decades, Lebanese Nigerian business executives entered into more sectors along with small and medium enterprises — such as grocery stores, supermarkets, and restaurants. In Kano, Levantine manufacturers supported and participated in the Manufacturers Association of Nigeria and the Kano Chamber of Commerce, Industry, Mines and Agriculture to lobby governments on policy. Lebanese Nigerians also began establishing educational institutions in the 2000s. By 2012, it was estimated that over 53,000 Nigerians worked in Lebanese-owned industries in Ibadan alone.

Criticism of the business practices of Lebanese Nigerian employers has continued into the twenty-first century. Lebanese industrialists have been accused of exploiting post-SAP structural imbalances, mistreatment of staff, denying indigenous Nigerian workers benefits such as gratuity or retirement packages, and paying indigenous Nigerian employees significantly less than Lebanese staff regardless of qualifications. A United Nations Research Institute for Social Development report reviewing the post-SAP manufacturing environment of Kano found that Levantine Nigerian-owned businesses used the same union-busting and exploitative practices as firms controlled by indigenous business owners or foreign conglomerates. Nonetheless, Scholars have argued that Lebanese businessmen in West Africa often exhibit a feeling of cultural arrogance and superiority over indigenous employees, with one paper categorizing many Lebanese West Africans as viewing themselves as "hard-working, innovative and natural businessmen" while characterising indigenous West Africans as "undependable, lazy and ignorant about business."

=== Transnational ties and remittances ===
Everything was built with money from Nigeria; our entire economy relies on emigration to Western Africa. Today, about 80 percent of the village works [in Nigeria] because they make much more money there than here.

— Pierre Daaboul, the deputy mayor of Miziara, interview by Middle East Eye

Lebanese Nigerians maintain strong ties to Lebanon with much of the community sending their children to Lebanon for marriage and schooling, and regularly monitoring events and news from Lebanon. Kaj argues that the Lebanese Nigerian disinclination to pursue deeper cultural assimilation may be partly a product of disenfranchisement as restrictive naturalisation policies and the racialisation of Nigerian citizenship discouraged integration, pushing the community toward strong ties with Lebanon rather than toward full participation in Nigerian public life.

Remittances from the Lebanese diaspora worldwide constitute a major component of Lebanon's economy with remittances from Africa accounting for 14.2% of total remittance inflows to Lebanon as of 2017. Remittances from Lebanese Nigerians specifically have been economically significant for the localities from which emigrants originated. The villages of Miziara and Jwaya continue to depend on remittances from relatives in Nigeria according to surveys. Miziara in particular was described as a "ghost town" for much of the year due to the amount of locals that live in Nigeria; the village's remittances also fund the construction of large villas, where over 300 houses were built between 2008 and 2017 alone.

Aside from individual remittances, Lebanese Nigerians have mobilised collectively during crises in Lebanon. During the 2006 Lebanon War, Lebanese Nigerians raised approximately $500,000 in emergency funds, channelled through the Lebanese Ambassador to Nigeria to conflict victims. Philanthropy has also been a feature of the community's ties to Lebanon, with diaspora organisations — including the Lebanese Ladies Society of Nigeria — funding development projects, churches, and social infrastructure in both Lebanon and Nigeria.

Anthropologist Fuad Khuri documented a mythology of prosperity that structured the relationship between emigrants in Africa and their villages of origin in Lebanon in the twentieth century. Emigrants that visited Lebanon had a "halo of success", since a community maxim — "never return to Lebanon with poverty; they have enough of it there" — meant that only the successful migrants returned at all. Prospective emigrants were told of wealth and communal harmony among the Lebanese community in Africa. On arrival, newcomers found a different reality with conflicts, factional loyalties, and calculated self-interest of their sponsors. Khuri viewed this gap between the mythology cultivated in Lebanon and the actual conditions of emigrant life as a defining experience of Lebanese West African identity — shaping both the community's internal tensions and the idealised image it projected back to Lebanon through remittances, conspicuous spending on home visits, and investment in large, visible houses in the home village.

== Culture and Society ==
=== Language ===
As typical with immigrant communities in Nigeria, Lebanese Nigerians often speak both English and the community's native language — Arabic (more specifically, the Lebanese variety). However, many Lebanese Nigerians also speak Nigerian Pidgin and indigenous Nigerian languages depending on the dominant language of their home regions. Additional research contends that this "linguistic adaptability" has been a key asset of the community for generations, with Levantine merchants often directly dealing with linguistically diverse customer bases. Winder observed that Lebanese West Africans are likely the largest non-indigenous community with working knowledge of West African languages in the world.

Language shift across generations was documented in the small Calabar Lebanese community in the twentieth century. The earliest Lebanese arrivals solely spoke Arabic before quickly learning Pidgin English for trade and one or more indigenous languages. All Calabar-born Lebanese were fluent speakers of Efik, with most having considerable command of Igbo. As English-medium schooling became standard, Calabar Lebanese born after 1925 were fluent English speakers. However, no Lebanese Nigerian born after 1930 spoke Arabic fluently, and children up to 15 years of age were described as "almost totally ignorant" of the language as English had become the language spoken at home.

On the other hand, Arabic fluency remained the norm in larger Lebanese communities. Arabic remains common in the thousands-strong Lebanese communities of Ibadan, Kano, and Lagos in the twenty-first century.

=== Religion ===
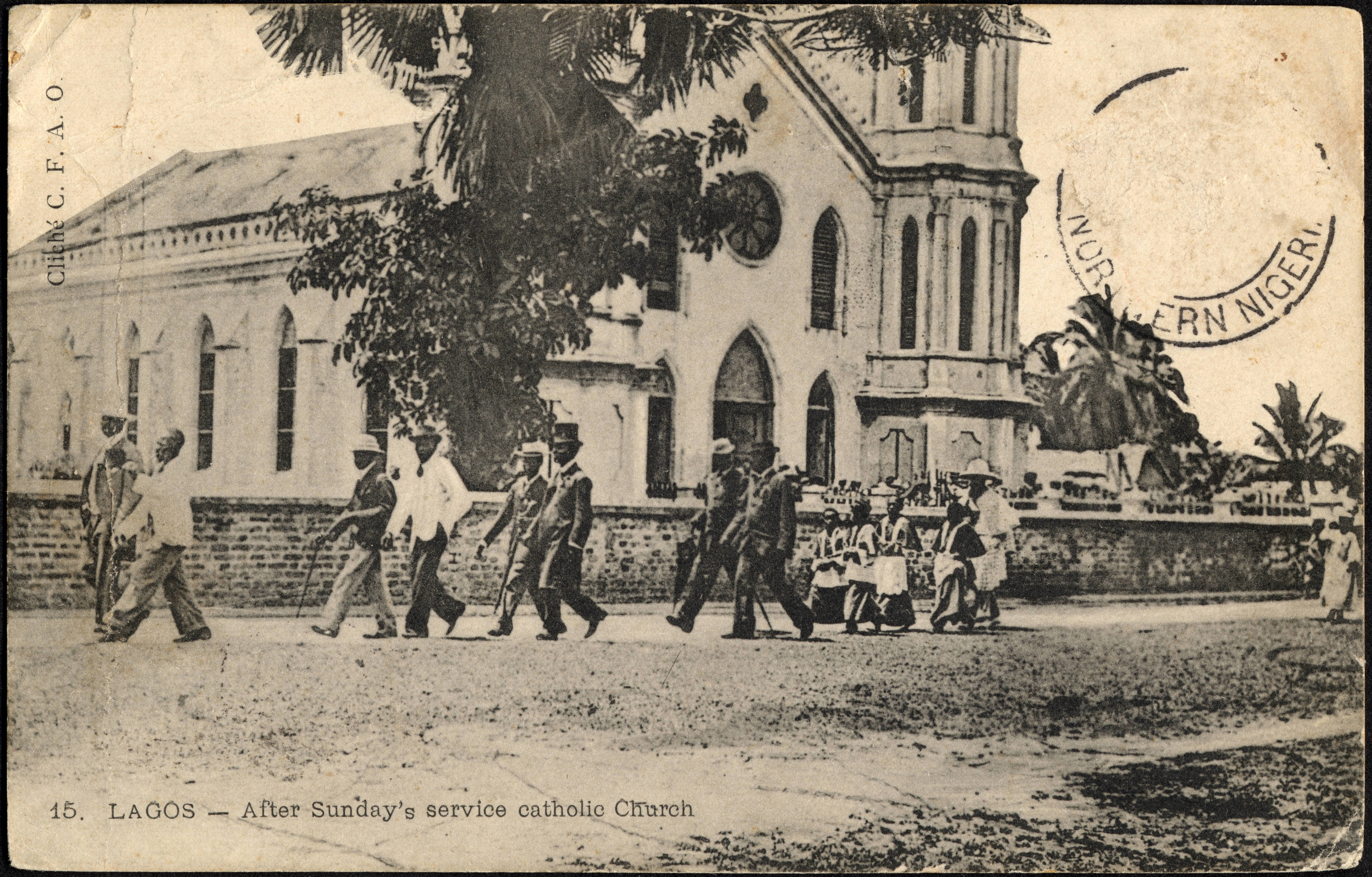
A Catholic church in Lagos in 1917

Reports show that the Lebanese Nigerian community contains adherents of all three of Lebanon's largest religious sects — Maronite Catholicism, Shia Islam, and Sunni Islam — in addition to much smaller communities of other Eastern Christians (including Greek Orthodox and Melkite Greek Catholics), Druze, and (historically) Lebanese Jews. The two largest religious groups have long been the Maronite and Shia communities, with research from the 1960s estimating that Lebanese Nigerians were 60% Christian (mainly Maronite) and 40% Muslim/Druze (mainly Shia).

Prior to the establishment of Greek Orthodox and Maronite churches in Nigeria, members of the sects would traditionally attend Anglican and Roman Catholic services, respectively. The Maronite Lebanese community of Calabar was described as major supporters of the Roman Catholic church in the city in the twentieth century. Before the completion of the Maronite cathedral in 2002, Ibadan's Maronite community attended the Roman Catholic Cathedral of St. Mary.

The Lebanese Maronite community has been crucial for the establishment of Eastern Christianity in Nigeria; notably, Ibadan hosts Our Lady of the Annunciation Cathedral, the eparchial seat of the Maronite Catholic Eparchy of the Annunciation — the Maronite eparchy that covers much of Sub-Saharan Africa. The eparchy has four parishes in Nigeria — in Abuja, Ibadan, Lagos, and Port Harcourt — with several thousand attendees including both Maronites and other Eastern Christians. Along with Greek Nigerians, the Lebanese Greek Orthodox community also supported churches that were eventually organised into the Orthodox Archdiocese of Nigeria in 1997.

Similarly, the Lebanese Shia community has played a major role in the history and development of Shia Islam in Nigeria, particularly in Kano. Scholars noted that the fact that some Lebanese immigrants were Muslim helped the wider community gain acceptance among predominantly-Muslim indigenous communities, who often assumed all Lebanese migrants would be Muslim because they spoke Arabic. Kano's Lebanese community hosted Musa al-Sadr on his West Africa tour in 1967. Initially, the Lebanese Shia community of Kano did not proselytize due to several factors: residential segregation of the colonial era, Lebanese traders' focus on their businesses, indigenous Kanoans' view of Lebanese as relatively secular and prone to gambling, and Lebanese community prejudice in viewing Shia Islam as exclusive to their own community. After the Iranian Revolution and the subsequent rise of indigenous Nigerian Shia movements, some Shia Lebanese Kanoans began actively proselytizing by distributing Shia literature and offering moral and financial support in operations independent of both the Islamic Movement and the Iranian-backed Dar al-Thaqalayn Organization.

Research from the 1960s noted a small Druze "scattering" in Nigeria with a community account decades later in 2010 placing the total Druze population at approximately 350 — living in Abuja, Ibadan, Kaduna, Kano, Lagos, and Maiduguri. Prominent Druze Nigerians include businessman and Syrian honorary consul Zaid Saimua, Anwar M. El-Khalil — a member of the El-Khalil family, the owners of the Seven-Up Bottling Company — and members of the Moukarim family, which founded the Mouka mattress company and donated a hospital building in Majiya, Jigawa State.

Scholars contend that community's attachment to separate religious institutions was consistent with other Lebanese diaspora groups, reflecting a communal tradition and broader aim to preserve a distinct identity. Researchers also noted mixed levels of religious observance.

=== Cuisine ===
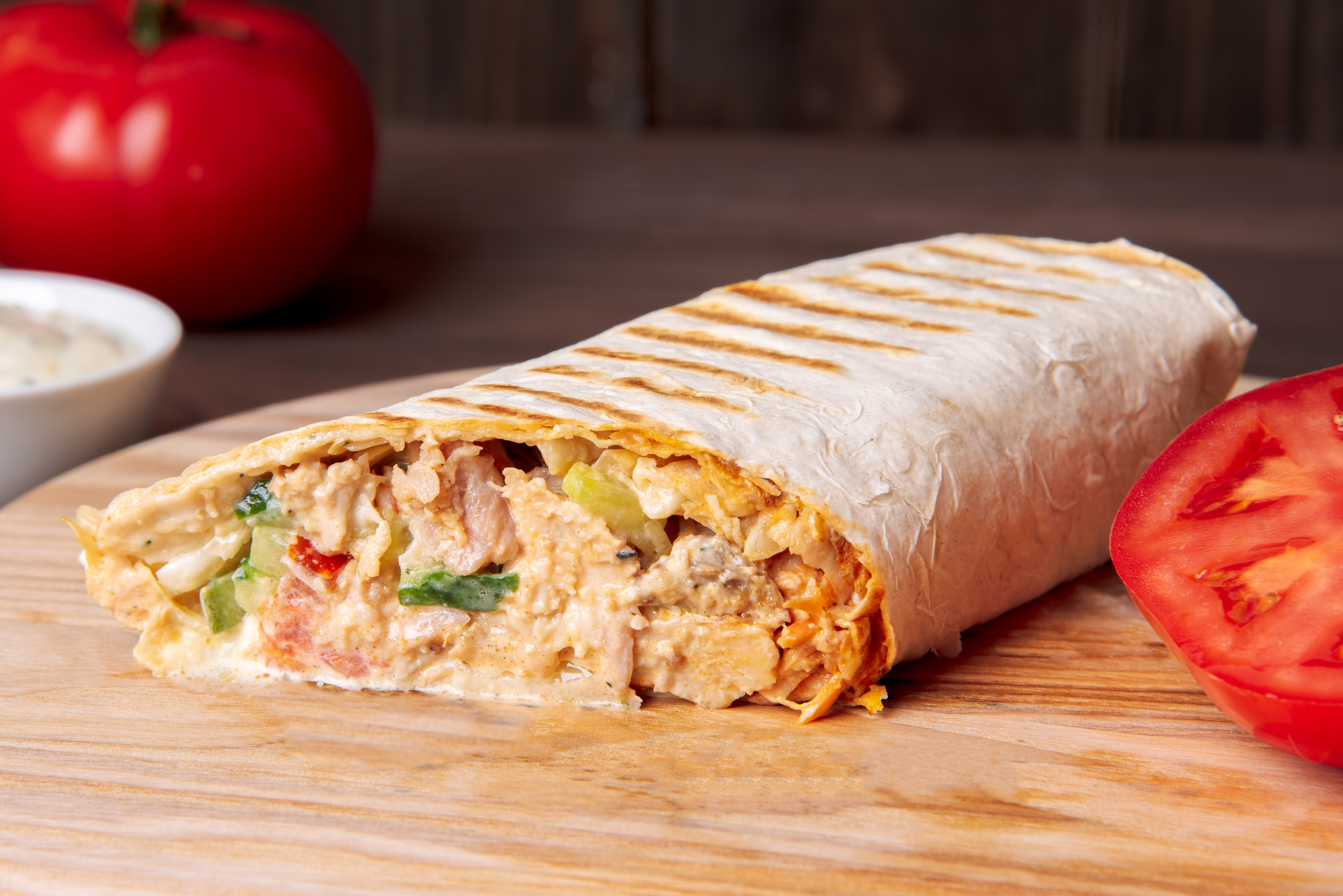
Shawarma — a Lebanese-introduced common dish in Nigerian cuisine

While the Lebanese Nigerian community itself often eats traditional Lebanese food, it has also adopted Nigerian cuisine and introduced Lebanese cuisine to Nigeria. Various Lebanese dishes — most prominently shawarma — have become common in Nigerian cuisine among both Lebanese and non-Lebanese communities. By the mid-twentieth century, Lebanese-owned eateries had begun offering shawarma, making it increasingly available to non-Lebanese Nigerians. Over subsequent decades, indigenous Nigerians adapted the dish substantially — replacing traditional garnishes such as tahini and garlic sauce with ketchup and mayonnaise along with additions of ingredients such as boiled eggs, coleslaw, chili peppers, and sausages — creating a distinct street food version.

One of the main features of the [Zaria Lebanon Club fundraiser] was the magnificent food provided by the Lebanese ladies. Mouth-watering, and most of it not too fattening, thank goodness.

— Theresa Ogunbiyi-Bowyer, New Nigerian (11 March 1967)

There are numerous Lebanese restaurants and food shops in Lagos, primarily in Victoria Island. Additionally, there are also Lebanese stores and restaurants in other cities with sizable Lebanese populations like Kano, Kaduna, Jos, Ibadan, Lagos, and Sokoto.

Lebanese food practices shifted based on broader patterns of trade and cultural adaptation. In the early and mid-twentieth century, researchers documented that the first Lebanese settlers had to substitute local ingredients for staples in Lebanese cooking — such as chickpeas, sesame seeds, and wheat flour — that were often unavailable in parts of Nigeria. As the community became larger and more prosperous, it was able to import increasing quantities of Lebanese food products. With the shipping constraints of World War II, the community shifted largely toward European and Nigerian cuisine, a shift that persisted after the war with many younger Nigeria-born Lebanese preferring Nigerian cuisine. However, there was a divide between larger Lebanese populations able to maintain Lebanese cuisine like in Kano and smaller Lebanese communities like in Calabar which switched to indigenous cuisine. In addition, retired returnees to Lebanon are reported to import Nigerian staples, such as cassava, garri, kola nuts, and okra. In the modern era, large Lebanese communities have been able to support supermarkets with imported Lebanese goods.

=== Politics ===
During the first half of the twentieth century, the main interactions between the Lebanese community and governments were various attempts by groups to lobby colonial administrators and indigenous chiefs. After independence, Lebanese Nigerians have continued to generally maintain a low political profile, preferring to exert influence through business relationships rather than through elected office or political participation. Scholars and journalists have attributed this approach in part to the historical experience of being targeted by nationalist politicians, which led members of the community to remain outside formal political contestation as a self-preservation strategy.

The few instances of direct political involvement include reports of the heavily disputed 1959 establishment of an "Oriental Branch" of the Northern People's Congress by Lebanese, Syrian, and Yemeni community leaders in Kano. After independence, some individual Lebanese Nigerians took prominent roles in politics including Abbas Hajaig — an engineer who unsuccessfully ran for Senate in Jigawa State in 2007 — and Gilbert Chagoury, a businessman known for his close connections to military Head of State Sani Abacha and President Bola Tinubu.

There is also involvement in Lebanese politics from the community with Nasserism being a major ideology among Lebanese Nigerian youth in the mid-twentieth century. During the 2006 Lebanon War, Lebanese Nigerians raised about $500,000 in funds for relief efforts. In October 2019, there were demonstrations in Lagos in solidarity with the 17 October Revolution. Several thousands in the community are registered to vote in Lebanon and on an individual level, there are various Lebanese Nigerians who later became politicians in Lebanon, including former Member of Parliament Anwar M. El-Khalil.

=== Social networks and marriage ===
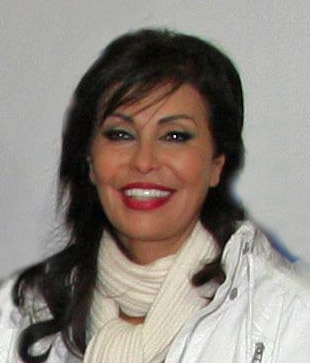
May El-Khalil, a philanthropist who immigrated to Nigeria upon marriage with a Lebanese Nigerian

Lebanese Nigerians have historically maintained tight social networks along family and communal boundaries along with living in ethnic concentrations. Although significant Lebanese Nigerian communities initially formed ethnic enclaves due to racialized colonial planning (such as early twentieth century Kano's Syrian or Lebanese Quarter), the end of de jure segregation led to the decline of communities based entirely on racial lines. After independence, Lebanese Nigerians often became concentrated in non-indigene neighbourhoods (often northern Sabon Garuruwa) along with middle and high-income areas of cities like Lagos' Victoria Island and Ibadan's Oluyole.

On marriage, Lebanese Nigerians generally practise endogamy, avoiding marriage with indigenous Nigerians and instead arranging marriages for their children with other Lebanese families, often in Lebanon. In Jos, two Lebanese men who married indigenous women in the 1960s were ostracised by the local Lebanese community and children from mixed marriages were often not accepted by Nigerian Lebanese communities.

Although there are some reports of early Lebanese-indigenous relationships, Khuri's comparative fieldwork across West Africa found that Nigeria was distinctive in having no significant mixed-descent Lebanese-African population, in contrast to Guinea, Senegal, and Sierra Leone, where the mixed-descent communities numbered in the thousands. Khuri attributed this the absence to the fact that Nigerian Lebanese communities had been relatively large since their earliest establishment, meaning that prospective Lebanese matches and internal social pressure had been present from an early stage before mixed unions could become entrenched. Additionally, there were very few Lebanese Nigerians historically living in rural areas with few other Lebanese residents; in Senegal and Sierra Leone, these isolated Lebanese residents were common and often entered into inter-ethnic marriages.

== Impact on Nigerian society ==
Lebanese Nigerian communities and individuals have organized donations for various causes, including Tinubu Square — an open space landmark in Lagos — which was donated by Lagos' Lebanese community for Nigerian independence in 1960. Lebanese groups have funded religious institutions along with schools — both government schools and private Lebanese community schools in Lagos and Kano — and hospitals, including the Nigerian Lebanese Hospital in Kano. Specific incidents — including the unrest preceding the Civil War, droughts, 2002 Lagos armoury explosion, and the COVID-19 outbreak — have also prompted Levantine Nigerian fundraising for impacted victims.

The Lebanese Nigerian-owned businesses have contributed to broader economic development. The continued domestic production and use of local agricultural raw materials by Lebanese Nigerian firms during unfavourable business climates helped stabilise markets and contribute to Nigerian economic growth. Additionally, tens of thousands are directly employed by Lebanese Nigerian businesses.

Lebanese traders also played a documented role in disrupting colonial-era European monopolies. By the 1930s, Lebanese retailers had forced European firms to exit the textile trade in Ibadan, and their practice of selling at lower prices than European competitors was credited with preventing price gouging. Colonial officials noted that the Lebanese role in trade was "one of the factors that had kept down the cost of living." Additionally, Levantine merchants impacted Nigerian nationalist economic thought by providing examples of successfully navigation of the British colonial system by non-Europeans ahead of the establishment of African-owned banks during the colonial period.

Lebanese Nigerians have made notable contributions to Nigerian sport through club ownership and competition sponsorship, particularly in football, horse racing, and polo. The Raccah family of Kano have historically funded and competed in horse racing and polo in addition to owning Raccah Rovers F.C., a defunct Nigerian Premier League-winning team. Additionally, businessman "Tahir Oil" owned the Kano-based Tahir United football club while footballer and administrator Najim Moukarim was labeled as "the brain behind Zaria soccer" in 1968. Lebanese Nigerian sporting patronage also extended to competition sponsorship with the Zard Cup, a junior football competition sponsored by a member of the Ibadan-based Zard family.

== Notable people ==
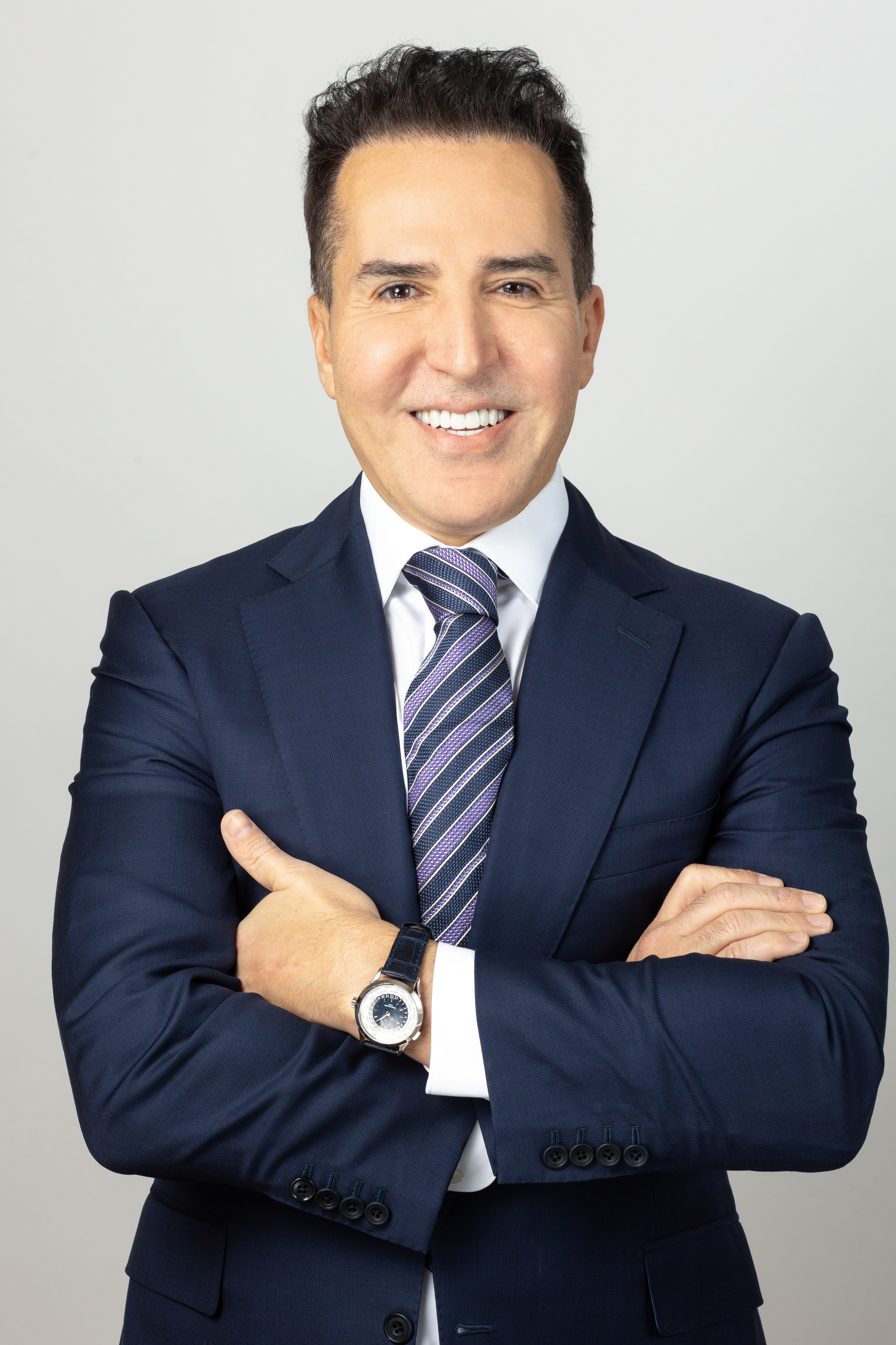
Sam Darwish

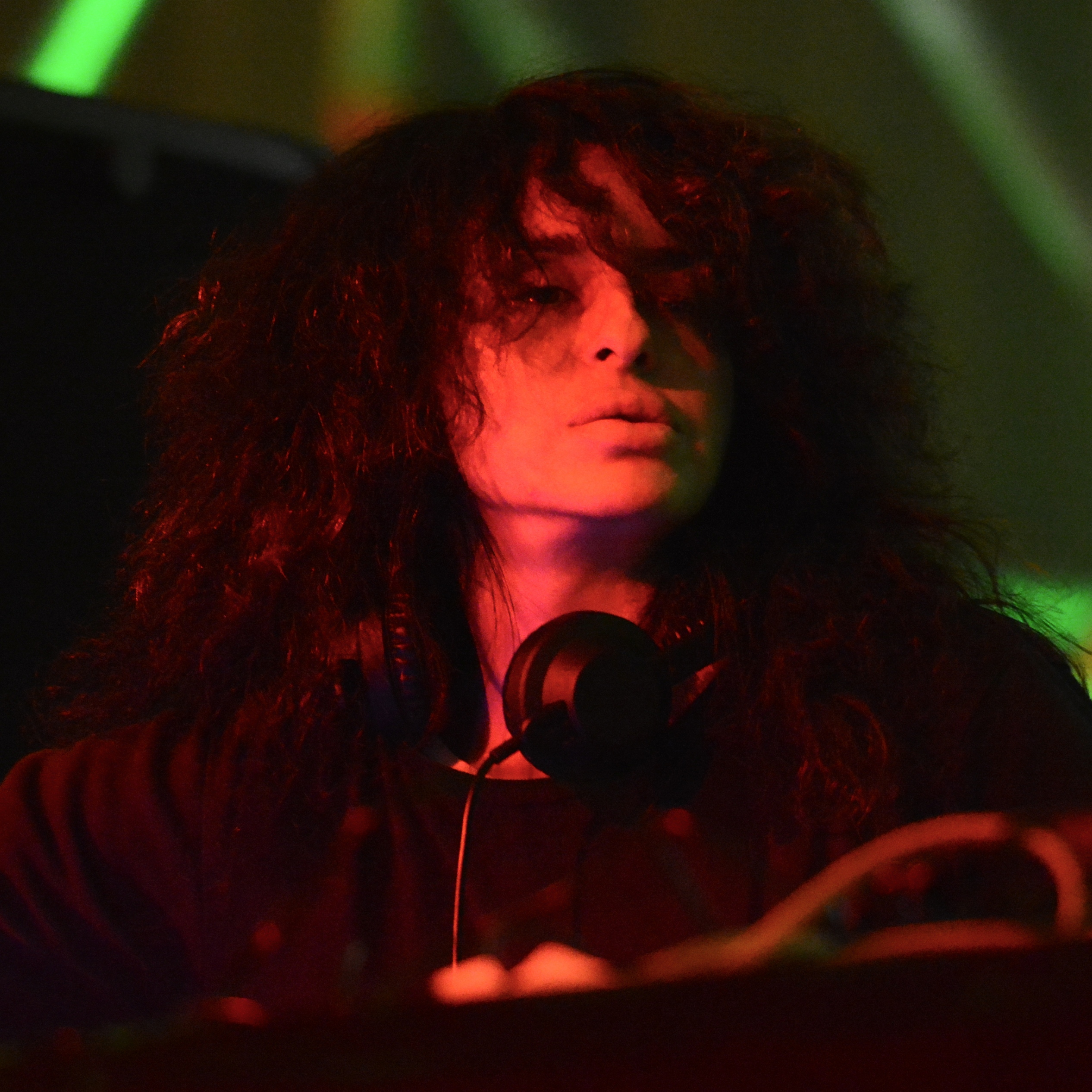
Nicole Moudaber

- Massad Boulos — businessman and diplomat
- Michael Boulos — businessman and son-in-law of United States President Donald Trump
- Ely Calil — businessman and property developer
- Gilbert Chagoury — businessman and co-founder of the Chagoury Group
- Ronald Chagoury — businessman and co-founder of the Chagoury Group
- Sam Darwish — businessman and founder of IHS Towers
- Simon Faddoul — Maronite Catholic bishop
- Bilal Fawaz — boxer
- Mimi Fawaz — sports journalist and presenter
- Anwar M. El-Khalil — businessman and politician
- May El-Khalil — philanthropist and founder of the Beirut Marathon
- Hassan El Mohamad — footballer
- Mona Khalil — conservationist
- Lola Maja — makeup artist
- Nicole Moudaber — DJ, event promoter, radio personality, and producer
- Jad Moukarim — musician and member of A.A.A
- Oyibo Rebel — musician and actor
- Laila St. Matthew-Daniel — anti-domestic violence and women's rights campaigner
- Salwa Toko — activist
- Margaret Vogt — diplomat
- Samir Zard — chemist and president of the department of chemistry at École polytechnique, Paris

== See also ==
- Lebanese diaspora
- List of Lebanese people in Africa
