= May El-Khalil =

Lebanese sports official

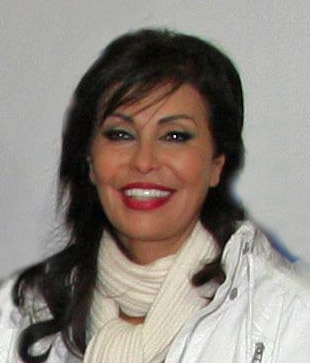
El-Khalil in December 2010

May El Khalil is the Founder and President of the Beirut Marathon Association, which oversees the annual Beirut Marathon and has been held every autumn since 2003. It was accredited by the International Association of Athletic Federations (IAAF) in 2009. In 2014, the race attracted over 38,000 runners from 104 countries.

== Biography ==
Born in Aley, Lebanon, May El Khalil spent much of her adult life in Nigeria following her marriage to business man Faysal El Khalil. In Nigeria, she established the Lebanese Ladies in Nigeria, a non-governmental organization dedicated to promoting educational development by way of grants and scholarships.

In 2001, after El Khalil had returned to Lebanon, she suffered a near-fatal accident that placed her in a coma. She spent two years undergoing dozens of surgeries that enabled her to walk again and inspired her to found the Beirut marathon.

In the aftermath of Lebanese Prime Minister Rafic Hariri's assassination in February 2005, the Beirut Marathon Association organized the “United We Run” race that attracted 60,000 runners.

El Khalil has been recognized for her work nationally and internationally; she has received the AIPS Power of Sport Award in Lausanne, and the Laureus World Sports Academy Lifetime achievement award in Abu Dhabi. She has been decorated by Lebanese President Michel Suleiman with the National Order of the Cedar, and has been granted appreciation awards from the Lebanese Ministry of Tourism, The Brazil-Lebanon Chamber of Commerce, and the Lebanese Ministry of Youth and Sport. El Khalil was also a Paul Harris Fellow of the Rotary Foundation of Rotary International for 2010 and 2011. In 2013 she was presented with an honorary Ph.D. from LAU (the Lebanese American University). In 2014 she was honoring by YWCA Lebanon on March 8 ( international Women's day ),

El Khalil spoke at the TED global conference in Edinburgh Scotland in 2013. In 2014, she was invited as a speaker at the European Innovation Convention on March 10. She was also invited by SEAL foundation as guest of Honor for their annual gala Dinner in New York. The Lebanese Franchise Association has chosen El Khalil to be one of the four recipients of the “ Appreciation Award”. On July 22, 2014, she received the Fair Play and peace award by the Premio Fair Play Mecenate committee in Arezzo, Italy.

El Khalil has four children and four grandchildren. Faysal M. El-Khalil is presently the Chairman of the Seven-Up Bottling Company based in Nigeria, Tanzania, Ghana and Kenya. Her brother in law is H.E. Anwar M. El-Khalil, a member of the Lebanese Parliament since 1992.
