= Abuja Airplane House =

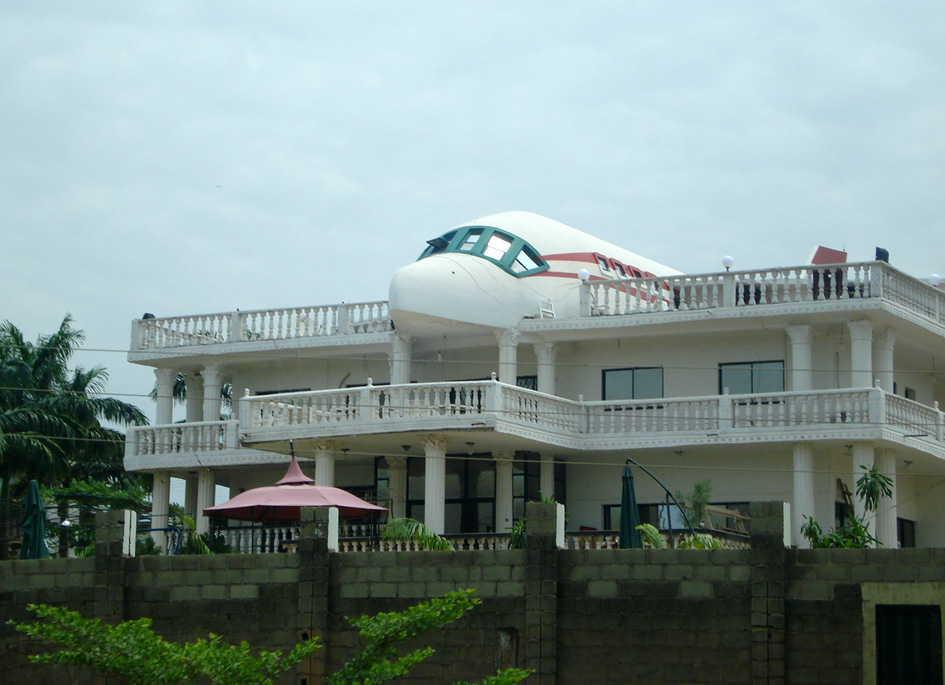
- Interactive map of the Abuja Airplane House area

General information
- Status: Under construction
- Architectural style: Airplane house
- Location: Jerome Udoji Close; Asokoro, Abuja
- Coordinates: 9°02′58.7″N 7°30′59.3″E
- Construction started: 2002
- Owner: Jammal Said: Liza Said

The Abuja Airplane House is located in the Asokoro district of Abuja in Nigeria. The house can be seen from the nearby Murtala Muhammad Expressway. Spanning the roof of the main villa is a 100-foot-long model of an airplane with a 50-foot wingspan. Beyond the main structure, the property features aircraft-themed buildings, including a two-story guard post designed as a control tower. The building is painted in the colors of the Nigerian flag—green and white—with the flag painted on one side of the 'plane' tail and the Lebanese cedar on the other.

My story is not just a love story, I built everything for my legacy in Nigeria, for my country, my children, my wife and everybody.

— Jammal Said

The house is owned by Jammal Said, a Lebanese-Nigerian working as a civil engineer who runs a construction company in Abuja. Born in Jos, he was inspired by his wife Laiz Said's passion for travel when envisioning the house. He promised to build a plane-shaped home for her as "a symbol of their love". He spent years searching for the ideal location after their 1980s marriage, finally finding it in 1999. Their son, Mohammed Jammal, known as 'White Nigerian' on social media, recalls being about 12 years old when construction began. Every day after school, he and his five siblings helped build the house. The house is still under construction decades after its commencement as Jammal insists on overseeing each phase without external professional aid.

== See also ==
- Lebanese Nigerians
