= Asokoro =

District in Abuja, Nigeria

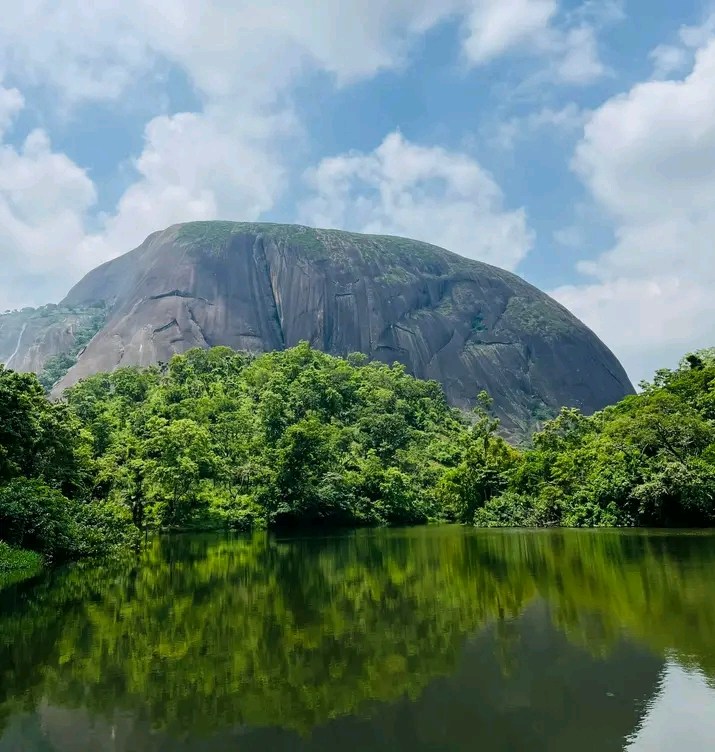
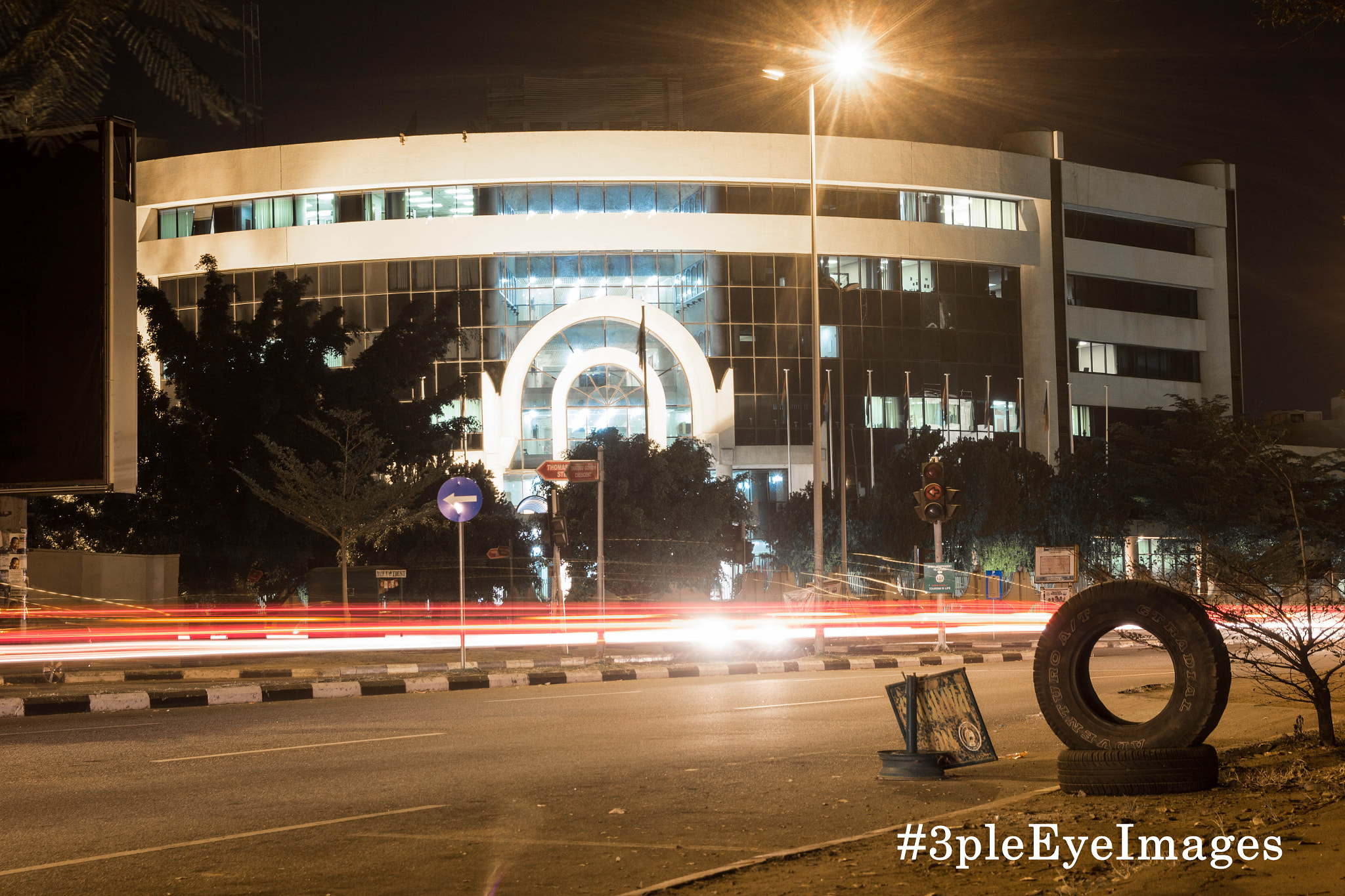
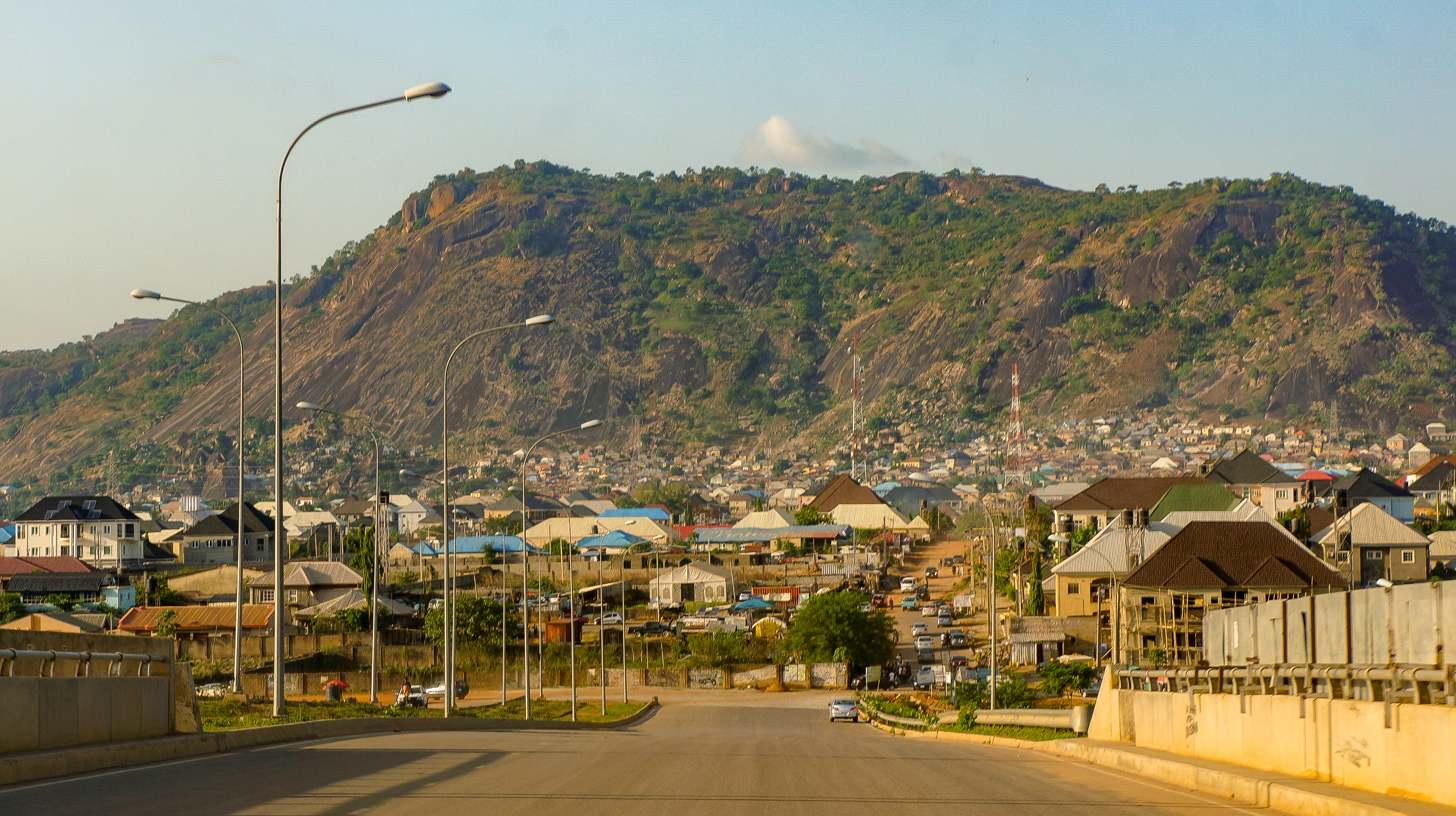
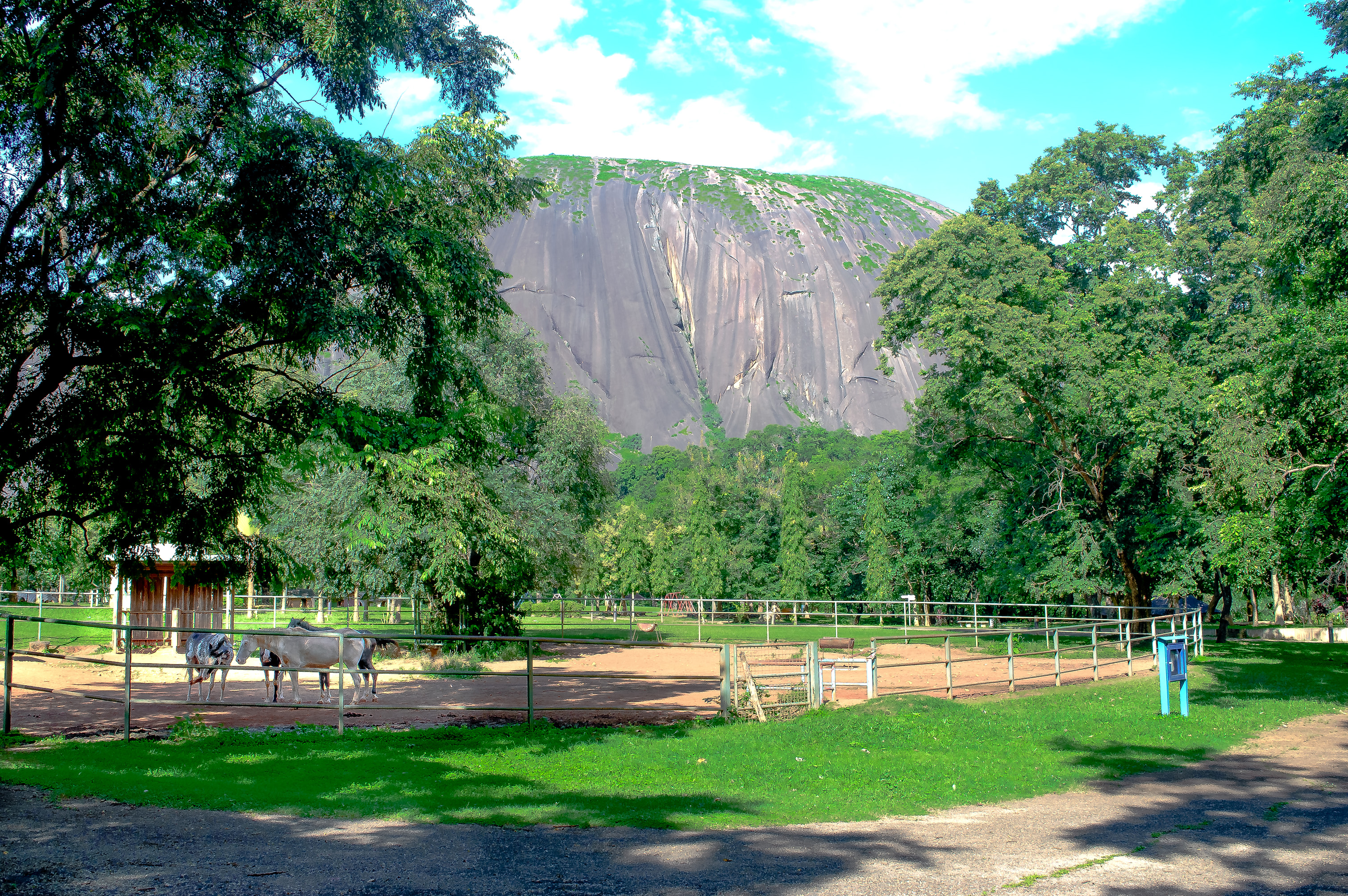
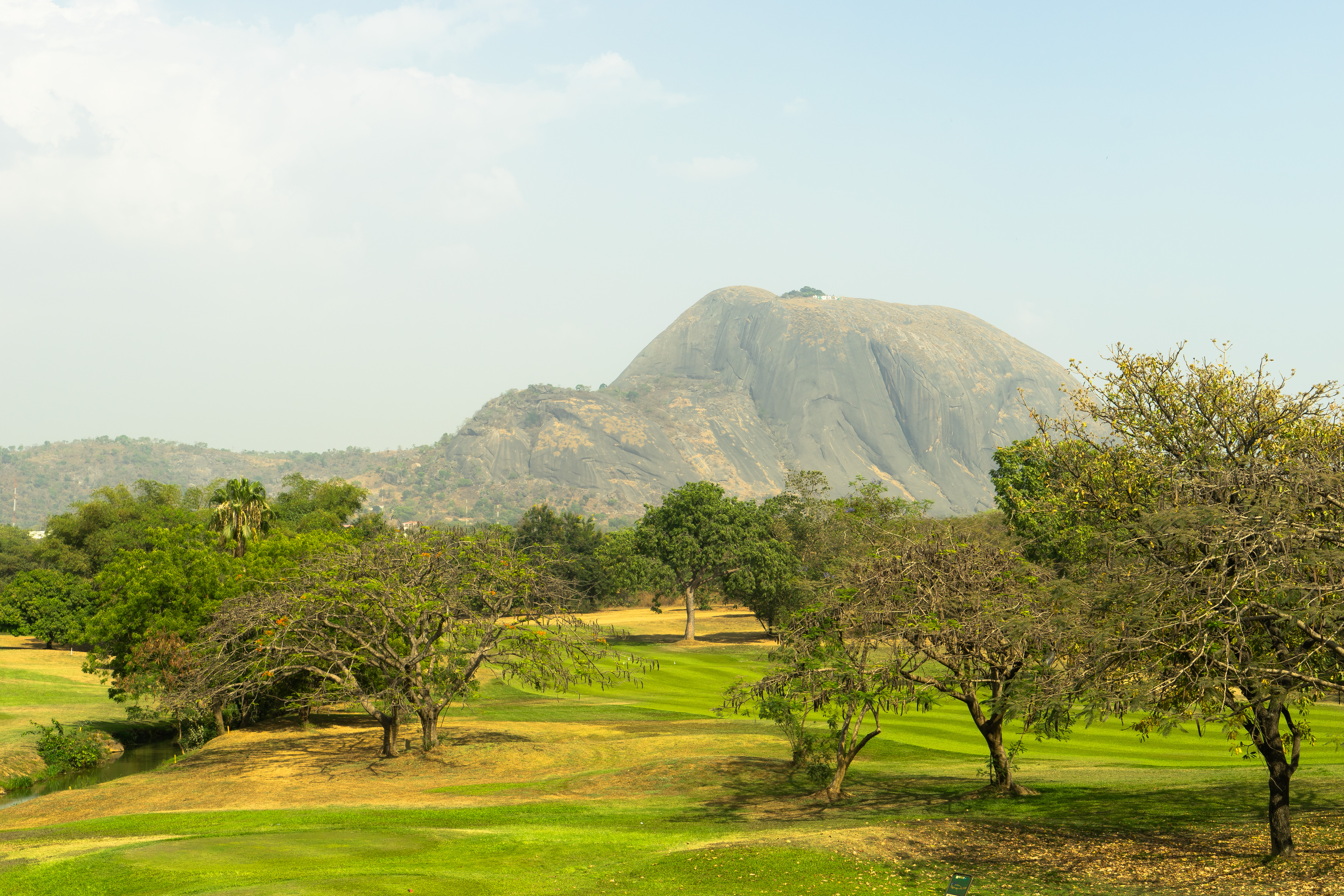
- From the top left; Top: The Aso Rock viewed from the National children’s Park and Zoo and the ECOWAS Secretariat; Middle: Kurunduma in Asokoro, and the National children’s Park and Zoo; Bottom: the Aso Rock viewed from the IBB golf course
- Interactive map of Asokoro
- Coordinates: 9°3′8.2″N 7°31′34.2″E
- Country: Nigeria
- Federal territory: Federal Capital Territory
- Federal capital: Abuja
- First settled: before 19th-century
- Incorporated: 1 October 1984

Government
  - Body: Federal Capital Territory Administration

Area
  - Total: 1,864.35 km^{2} (719.83 sq mi)
  - Water: 12.93 km^{2} (4.99 sq mi)

Asokoro is a upmarket district in Abuja, the capital city of Nigeria. The district hosts about 18 foreign embassies and consulates, the Economic Community of West Africa States (ECOWAS) secretariat, the headquarters of the National Intelligence Agency (NIA), the World Health Organization (WHO) office, the Aso Villa and all the state lodges of Nigeria's 36 states.

== History ==
Asokoro has its origins in the migration of the Koro people, led by Dodonniya, around 1798. They originally came from Likoro near Zaria and travelled through Kwaya to Abuja and settled near a hill they named Shishimpe, later moving to Galadimawa as their population grew. As the village became too small to accommodate their increasing numbers, they relocated to Zumbo (meaning 'gorgeous place'). Another wave of settlers, the Gbagyi people, arrived from Bauchi and established themselves in Kurunduma. Some Ebira immigrants also arrived around the same time and named the area Aso, meaning 'it will be liked'. Hence, the name Asokoro meaning 'the Koro of Aso'.

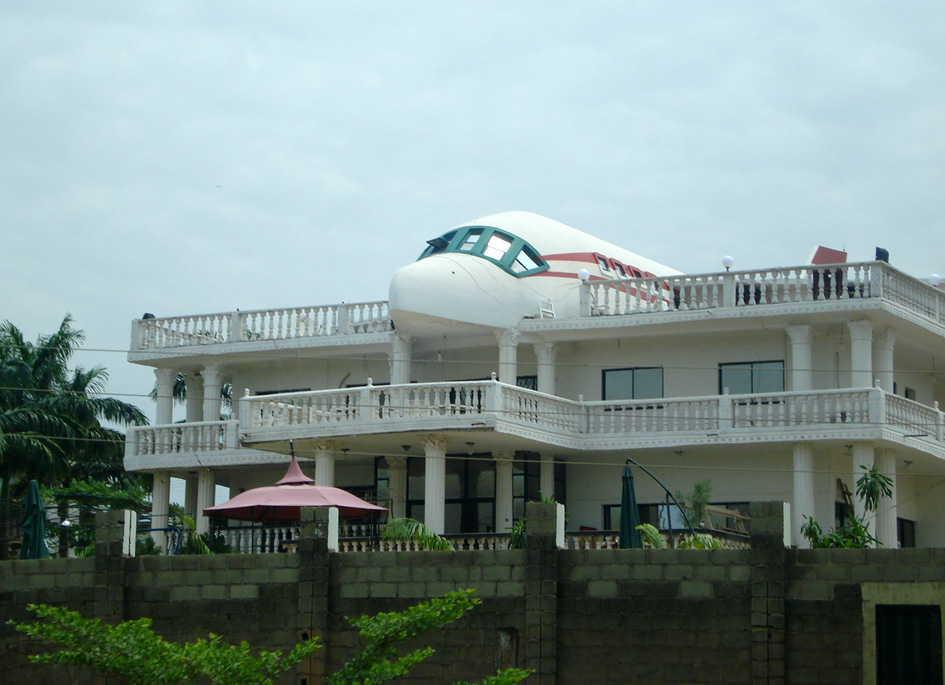
The Abuja Airplane House in Asokoro overlooking the Murtala Muhammad Expressway.

An alternative etymology for the name Asokoro could be associated with the Aso Rock, located in the area. The large igneous rock served as a natural fortress for the Gbagyi people residing in the vicinity. According to this interpretation, the rock was named Aso, signifying 'victory' in Gbagyi. Consequently, the term Asokoro could be derived from the collective identity of the inhabitants as the 'people of victory'.

During the 1970s and 1980s, Abuja underwent significant construction and development in anticipation of becoming the capital of Nigeria, succeeding Lagos. This transformation involved the government displacing many of the existing inhabitants of the region. On 12 December 1991, Abuja was officially declared the Federal Capital City, with Asokoro being one of its six districts. The other districts included Maitama, Wuse, Garki, the central business district, and the Three Arms Zone.
