= Seven-Up Bottling Company =

Nigerian soft drinks company

Seven-Up Bottling Company Ltd is a soft drinks manufacturer headquartered in Lagos, Nigeria. Its shares were previously quoted on the Nigerian Stock Exchange but after a buyout of outstanding public shares by the investment arm of the founder's family, it became privately owned. Seven-Up Bottling Company Ltd is one of the largest manufacturing companies in Nigeria, producing and distributing some of the nation's most-loved beverages in the country like; Pepsi, 7Up, Mirinda, Teem, Mountain Dew, H2oH!, Lipton Ice Tea, Supa Komando Energy Drink and Aquafina premium drinking water.

SBC has nine bottling plants with state-of-the-art manufacturing facilities strategically located across various regions in the country.

== History ==
Production of its first product, 7 Up started on October 1, 1960. The venture was a brainchild of the El-Khalil family from Lebanon. The family patriarch had founded a transport firm in Nigeria and then decided to divest into the soft drink market to compete with Leventis led Nigerian Bottling Company (NBC). In the 1960s, the firm introduced a brand of howdy products including Howdy, Crush, Howdy Tonic Water, and Howdy Ginger Ale. The firm's initial market was within Mid-West and Western Nigeria due to the location of its factory at Ijora, Lagos. To raise awareness and compete with NBC, they distributed outdoor branded kiosks to retailers.

In the 1970s, after the government promulgated an indigenisation decree, El-Khalil family sold their transport business and concentrated on the bottling business. Faysal El-Khalil, who managed the transport firm, joined Seven-Up and later became its managing director. As the purchasing power of consumers increased, the firm embarked on an expansion programme at the beginning of Nigeria's oil boom during the 1970s. A new factory was built in Oregun and followed by one at Ibadan and then at Aba. The company's push for nationwide coverage has led to factories being built in Kano, Kaduna, Enugu, Benin and Ilorin. Many of its expansion programs were financed with debt.

Currently, the firm markets 7-Up, Pepsi, Mirinda, Teem, Supa Komando and Mountain Dew.

== Marketing ==
Seven-Up developed promotions in the late 1980s has a structural adjustment program adopted by the government led to price increases. The promos involved limited prizes drawn under the crown cork of bottles. Consumers could win money, cars or other gift items during the promos. However, the odds of winning were not favorable and this sometimes led to backlash from segments of the community.

Seven-Up has a history of sports sponsorship in Nigeria. The firm sponsors a youth football academy.

The firm also introduced 35cl and 50cl bottles of Pepsi.

== See also ==
- Nigerian Bottling Company
