= Nigerian Bottling Company =

- Headquarters: Lagos, Nigeria
- Products: Coca Cola, Sprite, Eva Water, Schweppes, Fanta
- Website: https://ng.coca-colahellenic.com/

Nigerian Bottling Company is a beverage firm that is the franchise bottler of Coca-Cola in Nigeria. The firm has also owned the Nigerian franchise to market Fanta, Sprite, Schweppes, Ginger Ale, Limca, Krest, Parle Soda and Five Alive.

Nigerian Bottling Company also known as NBC, started production in 1953 at the basement facilities of the mainland Hotel, owned by Leventis Group producing Coke licensed from Coca Cola Company. In 1960, NBC introduced Fanta orange drink into the market and later Sprite lemon drink.

== Marketing and distribution ==
NBC has eight bottling facilities in Nigeria which provide supplies to various depots for onward distribution to wholesalers or dealers. Over the years, NBC has established or acquired factories producing raw materials in its supply chain. It established a maize farm at Agenebode, Edo State to produce fructose syrup, acquired interest in Crown cork facilities in Ijebu Ode and a glass making factory in Delta State. In 1996, it acquired Sapanda industries limited for N1.7B in an M&A deal.

Nigeria Bottling Company serves over 600 million consumers across abroad with a geographical footprint of 28 countries on 3 continents.

NBC produces more SKU's than its primary competitor, Seven-Up, it markets Coke, Coke zero, Fanta orange, Fanta apple, Schweppes, Pulpy Orange, Eva water etc.
