= Greece–Nigeria relations =

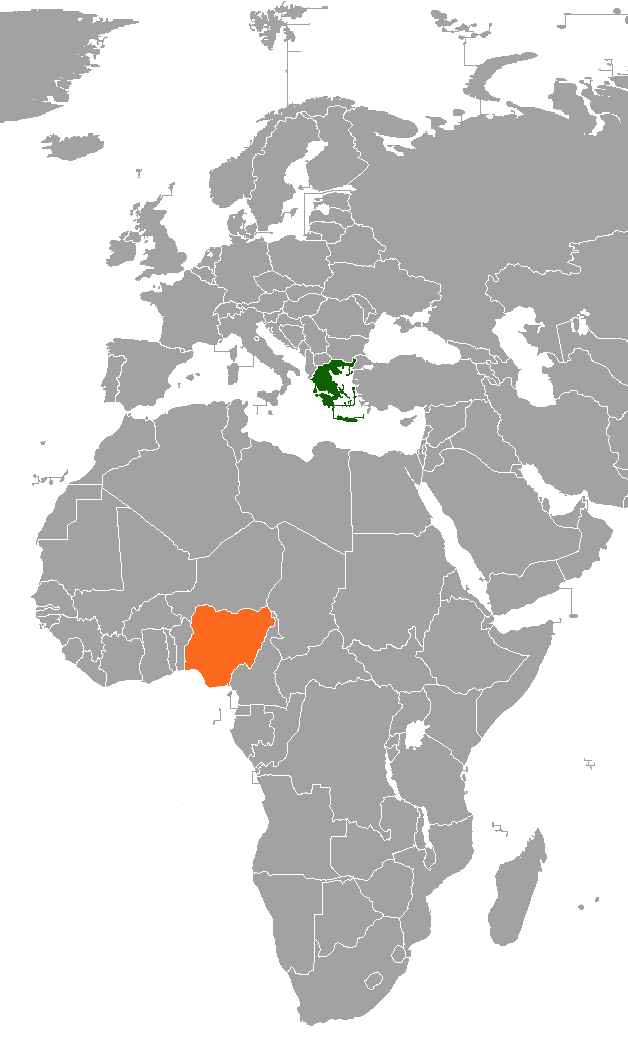

- Greece: Nigeria

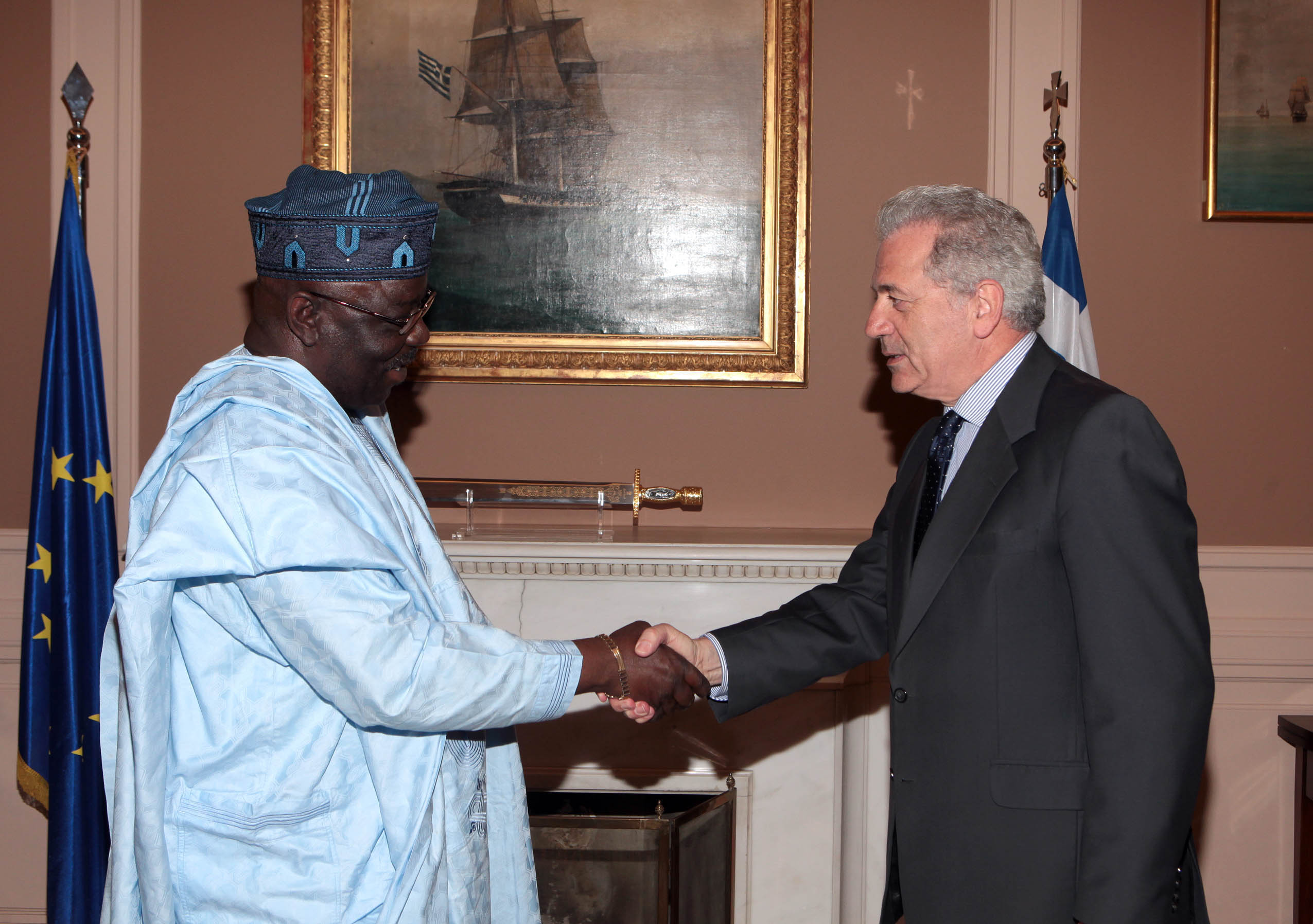
Foreign Minister Dimitris Avramopoulos met at the Foreign Ministry with the Ambassador of the Federal Republic of Nigeria Mr. Ayodeji Lawrence Ayodele. March 26, 2013

Greece–Nigeria relations are the bilateral relations between Greece and Nigeria. Nigeria has an embassy in Athens. Greece established a diplomatic mission in Nigeria in 1970, and today has an embassy in Abuja and a consulate in Lagos. Trade between the two countries is imbalanced, with imports from Greece to Nigeria exceeding exports. Greek-owned tankers have an important role in shipping Nigerian oil and natural gas, its main exports. In 2008, a Greek tanker was involved a dispute over crude oil smuggling. Greek-controlled companies have invested US$5 billion in the Nigerian economy. There is a small Greek business community in Lagos.

During the COVID-19 pandemic, Greece donated more than 1 million vaccines to Nigeria.

== Official relations ==
Greece and Nigeria enjoyed close ties before the Nigerian military regime took power in December 1983. In February 2000, the Nigerian embassy in Greece was re-established after a 16-year absence. Relationships between the countries are now generally good. On March 25, 2009, the outgoing Greek Ambassador to Nigeria, Haris Dafaranos, stated that Greece would continue to explore new areas of cooperation and boost cultural, economic, scientific and technological ties with Nigeria. This was confirmed when, on 22 April 2009, Greek Deputy FM Petros Doukas and visiting Nigerian Commerce and Industry Minister Charles Ugwuh signed a bilateral agreement in the economic, scientific and technology sectors. Ugwuh said "it is important, following a century of transactions between Greece and Nigeria, that an official agreement (on cooperation) was signed today". The two countries are discussing partnership in the development of the Free Trade Zones in Nigeria.

== Trade and investment ==
With the return to democracy in 2000, trade between the two countries is growing fast. The Hellenic African Chamber of Commerce and Development holds annual conferences where Greek businesses involved in African trade discuss opportunities with ministers and delegations from Nigeria and other countries. By 2003 Greek exports to Nigeria totalled US$46.5 million, with imports totaling US$5.4 million. By 2005, Greece exports had risen to €65.7 million, with imports of €20.2 million. Greek investments in Nigeria today exceed US$5 billion, and are growing. For example, in 2005 the Greek owned Flour Mills of Nigeria announced an investment of US$350 million to create a cement factory in Calabar. Estimated project costs have risen and are now in excess of US$500 million

According to a report on "Trafficking in Persons" issued by the United States Department of State in 2008, Nigerian women and girls are trafficked to Europe for the purposes of forced labor and commercial sexual exploitation, most notably to Italy, Spain, the Netherlands, Belgium, Austria, Norway, and Greece. Approximately 10% of prostitutes in Greece are estimated to be from Nigeria, most of whom are victims of the slave trade.

== Shipping ==
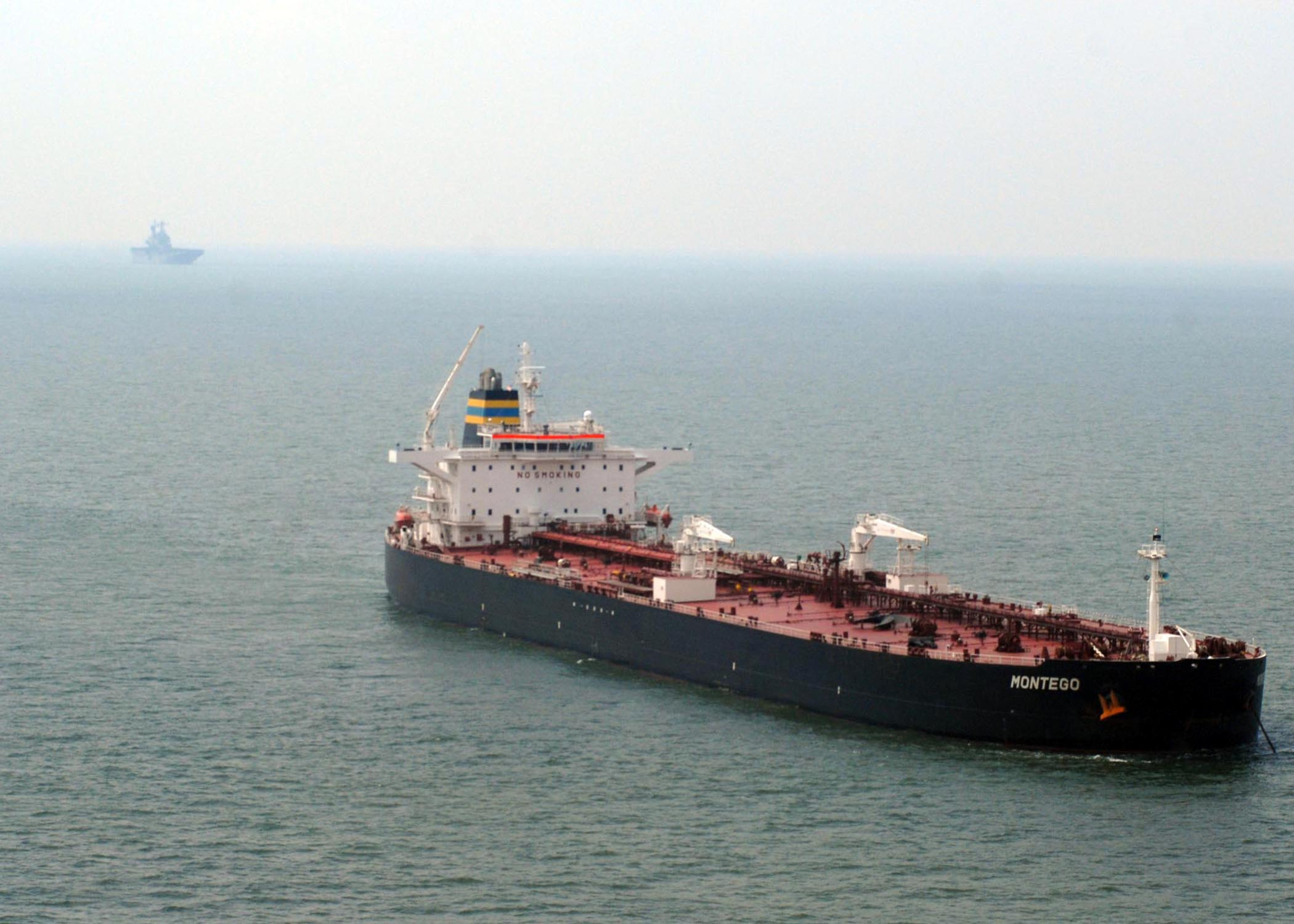
Greek tanker Montego

In 2007, Nigeria had about 8.3% of the world market in natural gas exports, and was exporting about 2,400,000 bbl/d (380,000 m^{3}/d) of oil using tankers, although volumes have been declining due to civic unrest and reduced demand. As of 2007, Greek-owned companies owned about 18% of the world fleet. The ships are registered under a variety of flags, including "flags of convenience", but with changing regulations an increasing number of Greek-owned tankers are registered under the Greek flag.

There are issues concerning the safety of Greek / Nigeria shipping. In November, 2008 the captain of an impounded Greek oil tanker accused Nigeria's armed forces of co-operating with militants in the Niger Delta to hijack his ship. The captain claimed that the militants had forced his crew at gun-point to load smuggled oil while three Nigerian naval gunboats looked on. Nigeria denied the allegation. Thirteen Filipino crew members of the oil tanker were arrested by the Nigerian government on suspicion of stealing thousands of tons of crude oil. Following kidnappings and other problems with workers on Greek vessels in the Nigerian coastal trade, the Philippine Overseas Employment Administration has issued warnings to Filipino seafarers working on such vessels.

== Movement of people ==
=== Greeks in Nigeria ===
Large Greek-owned companies have been operating in Nigeria for decades, such as the Mandilas Group, Nigeria Flour Mills and the Anglo-Hellenic multinational Patterson-Zochonis. The Leventis Group of Companies, trading in merchandise in West Africa, was founded in the 1930s by the Cypriot Anastasios George Leventis. By the time of his death in October 1978 it was one of the largest enterprises and one of the two largest employers in Nigeria. The Leventis Foundation, established by A.G. Leventis, has been active since 1979 with its main goal the training of young farmers in modern agricultural methods.

There were more than 10,000 Greeks living and working in Nigeria before the Nigerian military regime took power in December 1983, many of whom left the country. Today the Greek Diaspora in Nigeria numbers about 300 mostly residing in Lagos and working as company executives in large Greek-Nigerian companies. A Greek Orthodox holy bishopric operates in Nigeria, based in Lagos.

=== Nigerians in Greece ===
In 2001, there were about 3,000 Nigerians in Greece, about half of whom live in Athens. Some came to Greece as university students, while others are economic migrants. The Nigerian Community of Greece (NCG) organization was created in 1990 to help new Nigerian immigrants gain legal status, and to provide a social network for Nigerian residents. Famous Hellenized-Nigerians include NBA basketball player Giannis Antetokounmpo, along with his brothers Thanasis and Kostas, who are currently playing in the United States.

== See also ==
- Foreign relations of Greece
- Foreign relations of Nigeria
- Greek shipping
