= Beirut Marathon =

Annual event that takes place in Beirut, Lebanon

Coordinates: 33°54′08″N 35°30′12″E

- Date: November
- Location: Beirut, Lebanon
- Event type: Road
- Distance: Marathon
- Primary sponsor: Aquafina
- Established: 2003 (23 years ago)
- Course records: Men: 2:10:34 (2023) (Ethiopia) Gaddisa Dekeba; Women: 2:27:48 (2023) (Ethiopia) Mulugojam Ambi
- Website: Beirut Marathon
- Participants: 48,605 (all races) (2018); 565 finishers (marathon) (2015)

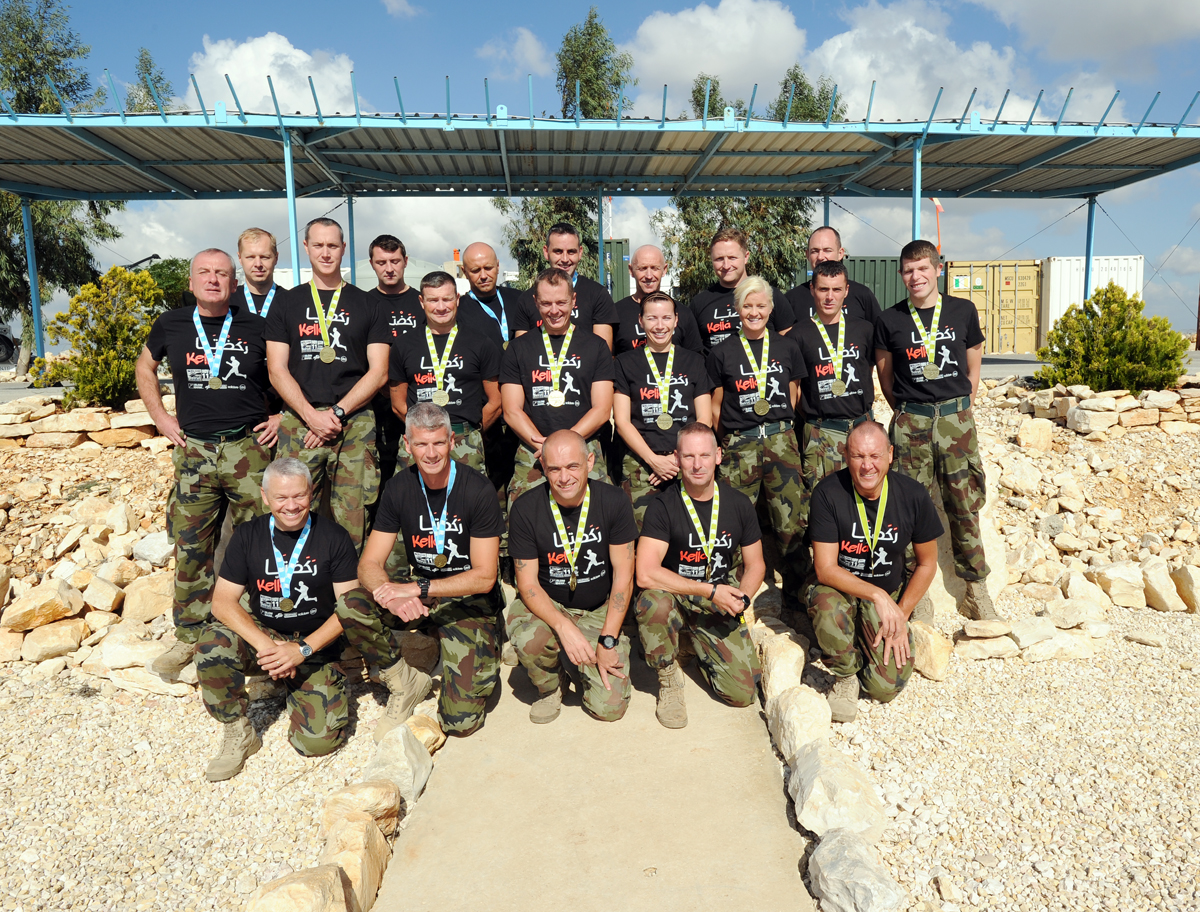
A group of runners in 2012

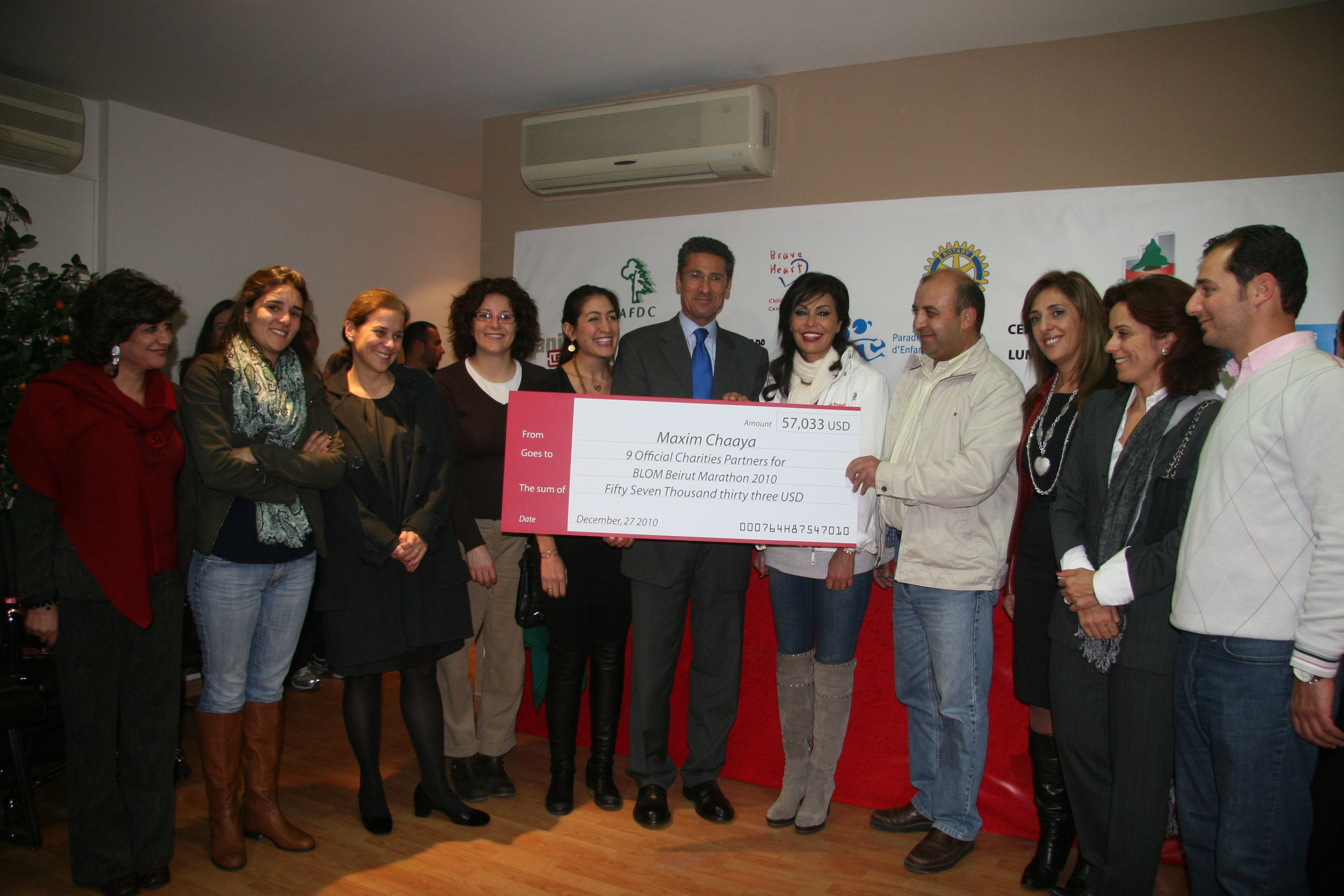
The organizer of the Beirut Marathon, May El-Khalil (5.f.r.), receives a charity cheque (2010)

The Beirut Marathon, is an annual event that takes place in Beirut, Lebanon, first held in 2003. It is a founding member of Asian Premier Marathons, and was accredited as a Silver Label Road Race by the IAAF.

The marathons are managed by the Beirut Marathon Association, a non-profit non-governmental organization registered under the Ministry of Youth and Sports in Lebanon. It is sponsored by the BLOM Bank.

== History ==
The race, created by businesswoman May El-Khalil, has the theme of unity at its core.

The first marathon was held on October 19, 2003 and attracted over 6,000 runners from 49 countries, and tens of thousands of Lebanese and international spectators.

The 2010 edition of the men's race was won by the pacemaker Mohamed Temam. Hussein Awadah broke the Lebanese record at the race that year, completing the distance in at a time of 2:20:31.

In 2011, the course was altered to make it faster and easier to organise and the men's and women's record were both improved that year; Seada Kedir knocked over five minutes off the women's best time.

The 2019 edition of the race was cancelled due to anti-government protests, with all registrants given the option of transferring their entry to 2020 or obtaining a refund.

The 2020 edition of the race was cancelled due to the coronavirus pandemic, with all who had transferred their entry from 2019 given the option of obtaining a refund.

== Other activities ==
Beirut Marathon Association also organizes their annual marathon village which was sponsored by Transmed in 2017.

== Community impact ==
The race reaches out to all sides of the political spectrum in Lebanon. The day's events also include a 3 km race for MPs of any political allegiance, as well as members of the United Nations Interim Force in Lebanon stationed in the country.

== Winners ==
Key: Course record (in bold)

Ed.	Date	Male Winner	Time	Female Winner	Time	Rf.
1	19 October 2003	Paul Rugut (KEN)	2:17:04	Jackline Torori (KEN)	2:42:29	
2	10 October 2004	Eshetu Bekele (ETH)	2:17:31	Anastasia Ndereba (KEN)	2:36:46	
3	13 November 2005	Francis Kamau (KEN)	2:19:20	Jane Omoro (KEN)	2:42:19	
4	3 December 2006	Moses Kemboi (KEN)	2:17:28	Eunice Korir (KEN)	2:49:25	
5	18 November 2007	Tamrat Elanso (ETH)	2:19:46	Beyene Adenech (ETH)	2:41:24	
6	30 November 2008	Alemayehu Shumye (ETH)	2:12:47	Alemtsehay Hailu (ETH)	2:37:20	
7	6 December 2009	Mohammed Temam (ETH)	2:16:12	Mihret Tadesse (ETH)	2:42:41	
8	7 November 2010	Mohammed Temam (ETH)	2:16:43	Etaferahu Tarekegne (ETH)	2:41:15	
9	27 November 2011	Tariku Jufar (ETH)	2:11:14	Seada Kedir (ETH)	2:31:38	
10	11 November 2012	Kedir Fekadu (ETH)	2:12:57	Seada Kedir (ETH)	2:35:08	
11	10 November 2013	William Kipsang (KEN)	2:13:34	Rehima Kedir (ETH)	2:36:47	
12	9 November 2014	Fikadu Girma (ETH)	2:12:26	Mulahabt Tsega (ETH)	2:29:15	
13	8 November 2015	Jackson Limo (KEN)	2:11:04	Kaltoum Bouaasayriya (MAR)	2:36:05	
14	13 November 2016	Edwin Kiptoo (KEN)	2:13:19	Tigist Girma (ETH)	2:32:48	
15	12 November 2017	Dominic Ruto (KEN)	2:10:42	Eunice Chumba (BHR)	2:28:38	
16	11 November 2018	Mohamed El Aaraby (MAR)	2:10:41	Medina Armino (ETH)	2:29:31	
—	10 November 2019	cancelled due to anti-government protests				
—	8 November 2020	cancelled due to coronavirus pandemic				
17	14 November 2021	Toni Hanna (LBN)	2:33:03	Chirine Njeim (LBN)	3:00:18	
18	13 November 2022	Mitku Dekeba (ETH)	2:14:21	Mulugojam Ambi (ETH)	2:28:57	
19	12 November 2023	Gaddisa Dekeba (ETH)	**2:10:34**	Mulugojam Ambi (ETH)	**2:27:48**	
