= Simon Faddoul =

Bishop of the Maronite Catholic Eparchy of the Annunciation

- Eparch of Our Lady of the Annunciation at Ibadan
- Native name: سيمون فضول
- Church: Maronite Church
- Diocese: Maronite Catholic Eparchy of the Annunciation
- Appointed: 28 February 2018
- Predecessor: himself, as Apostolic Exarch
- Previous posts: Apostolic Exarch of Western and Central Africa (2014-2018)

Orders
- Ordination: 9 August 1987
- Consecration: 7 April 2018 by Bechara Boutros al-Raï

Personal details
- Born: 7 January 1958 (age 68) Dik El Mehdi, Mount Lebanon Governorate, Lebanon

Simon Faddoul (in Arabic: سيمون فضول; born 7 January 1958 in Dik El Mehdi, Lebanon) is the current Bishop of the Maronite Catholic Eparchy of the Annunciation since 2018.

Simon Faddoul was ordained to the priesthood on 9 August 1987 in the Maronite Catholic Archeparchy of Antelias.

On 13 January 2014 he was appointed by Pope Francis Apostolic Exarch to Western and Central Africa (without conferring upon him the episcopal dignity) and Apostolic Visitor for Southern Africa. In 2018, the exarchy was elevated to an eparchy and Faddoul was ordained a bishop.
