= Laila St. Matthew-Daniel =

Nigerian-born Lebanese women's rights activist and writer

- Born: 1953 (age 72–73); Lagos state
- Citizenship: Nigerian
- Occupations: Executive coach, leadership trainer, speaker, author, Writer, Human Right activists

Laila St. Matthew-Daniel (born February 14, 1953, in Lagos, Nigeria) is an executive coach, leadership trainer, speaker, author, women's rights activist and writer. She is the founder and President of ACTS Generation GBV, a non-governmental organization which combats domestic violence and child abuse in Nigeria. She has organized various protests for the rights of women and the girl-child, some of which are the Buni Yadi Massacre of February 2014 and part of initiating group who organized first protest against the Chibok schoolgirls kidnapping by the Boko Haram sect. She has organized various sensitization seminars and workshops empower women on the issues of self mastery, self awareness, and self actualization.
