= Our Lady of the Annunciation Cathedral, Ibadan =

Our Lady of the Annunciation Cathedral
- Our Lady of the Annunciation Cathedral
- Location: Ibadan
- Country: Nigeria
- Denomination: Catholic Church (Maronite or Antiochian rite)

Administration
- Diocese: Eparchy of the Annunciation

The Our Lady of the Annunciation Cathedral also called Catholic Maronite Cathedral of Ibadan Is the name given to a religious building affiliated with the Catholic Church which is located in the city of Ibadan capital of the state of Oyo in the southwest of the African country of Nigeria. It should not be confused with the Cathedral of St. Mary in the same city but that follows the Latin or Roman rite and is home of the metropolitan Archdiocese of Ibadan.

It is a temple whose first stone was laid in the year 2000 and was consecrated two years later. It follows the Maronite or Antiochene rite and is the main church of the Maronite Apostolic Exarchate of West and Central Africa (Exarchatus Apostolicus Africae Centralis et Occidentalis) That was created by decision of the Pope Francis through the bull "Patrimonium ecclesiarum" on January 13, 2014.

It is dedicated to the Virgin Mary specifically to the biblical event of the Annunciation and is under the responsibility of Father Simon Faddoul.

== See also ==
- Catholicism in Nigeria
- Our Lady of the Annunciation Cathedral, Boston USA
