= Maronite Catholic Eparchy of the Annunciation =

Eastern Catholic eparchy in west & central Africa

Eparchy of the Annunciation

Location
- Country: Nigeria, Cameroon, Ivory Coast, Senegal
- Metropolitan: Immediately subject to the Holy See

Statistics
- Parishes: 12

Information
- Denomination: Catholic Church
- Sui iuris church: Maronite Church
- Rite: West Syriac Rite
- Established: 28 February 2018
- Cathedral: Our Lady of the Annunciation Cathedral, Ibadan

Current leadership
- Pope: Leo XIV
- Patriarch: Bechara Boutros al-Rahi
- Eparch: Simon Faddoul

The Eparchy of the Annunciation is an Eparchy of the Maronite Church immediately subject to the Holy See located in Nigeria, Benin, Togo, Cameroon, Ivory Coast, Ghana, Senegal and Angola. Its current ordinary is Eparch Simon Faddoul.

== Territory and statistics ==
The eparchy encompasses the Maronite faithful living in West and Central Africa. Its eparchial seat is at the Our Lady of the Annunciation Cathedral in the city of Ibadan in Nigeria.

== History ==
The eparchy was erected as the Maronite Apostolic Exarchate of Western and Central Africa by Pope Francis on 13 January 2014 with the papal bull Patrimonium ecclesiarum. Excepting eparchies of the Ethiopian Catholic Church and Eritrean Catholic Church, this was the first ecclesiastical circumscription of an Eastern Catholic Church established in Sub-Saharan Africa. The apostolic exarchate was promoted to the status of an eparchy on 28 February 2018.

Simon Faddoul, former president of Caritas Lebanon, served as apostolic exarch without episcopal character and was chosen to become the first bishop of the eparchy when the apostolic exarchate was promoted. He has also served as apostolic visitor to the Maronite faithful in Southern Africa since his initial appointment as apostolic exarch.

== Ordinaries ==
- Simon Faddoul (as apostolic exarch from 13 January 2014, as eparch-elect since 28 February 2018, as eparch since 7 April 2018)
