= World Lebanese Cultural Union =

International non-profit for Lebanese immigrants

- Abbreviation: WLCU
- Predecessor: World Lebanese Union
- Formation: 1959
- Purpose: Representative of the Lebanese diaspora in the world
- Headquarters: New York
- Location: International
- President: Nabih Chartouni

World Lebanese Cultural Union (WLCU) is an international, secular, non-denominational, non-profit organization, working independently in cooperation with Lebanese emigrants abroad, representing the Lebanese Diaspora in the world. WLCU has offices in many major centers of Lebanese presence worldwide.

== 1960 - mid-1990s ==
The organization, founded in Beirut, Lebanon in 1960 by expats from Mexico led by Jorge Trabulse Hindi, under the name World Lebanese Union and later in 1973 on the name was changed to World Lebanese Cultural Union to promote the cultural aspects of the Lebanese people throughout the world. It strives to unite descendants of Lebanese origin and friends of Lebanon into one worldwide organization or union with the aim to promote and preserve Lebanese culture and heritage and to ensure its spirit for generations to come.

The Lebanese Civil War, deep political and at times confessional differences and Lebanese official government interventions have resulted in resentment and formation of rival groups, although the official historical organization claims it is the only one abiding by WLCU bylaws as amended in 1985 and duly recorded at the Interior Ministry in Beirut.

== Late 1990s - fragmentation ==
Persistent opposition to the legal status of the officially sponsored WLCU body resulted in late 1990s in a clear rift between some world bodies and the traditional leadership of the WLCU. The splinter groups protested the hegemony of official Lebanese government bodies on the process of decision-making, in clear contravention of the original charter of the organization as a non-political and non-governmental world body representing the Lebanese emigrants independently of the ruling government of the time. The rift expanded further with political affiliations of the official body (during the presidency of Ahmad Nasser, later replaced by Massaad Hajal) with the sponsorship of the Lebanese Foreign Ministry and Interior Ministry permits, and the opposition WLCU movement run by splinter group Presidents Bechara Bechara, Joe Beayni, Anise Garabet, Elie Hakmeh, Eid Chedrawi (2009) and Michel Doueihi (2012). This latter group is also an INGO associated with the DPI and accredited with the ECOSOC of the United Nations.

== 2010 - further divisions ==
2010 general congress of the official WLCU organization resulted in further split from Ahmad Nasser organization with a new splinter group previously running under Nasser to hold its independent congress and election of Albert Matta as President of a third WLCU grouping worldwide.

In November 2012, there was a joint meeting on occasion of Lebanese Independence to unify the faction led by Albert Matta with the historical jurisdiction under Massad Hajal, but no tangible result for unification could be achieved.

On 25 October 2013, the historical jurisdiction held its general assembly in Beirut re-electing its previous president Ahmad Nasser to a new term after the end of the presidency of Massad Hajal. This was done despite the legal injunction from the faction presided by Albert Matta to postpone the general assembly.

== Present position ==
WLCU is divided between three conflicting jurisdictions each claiming authority:

- Historical jurisdiction under the presidency of Ahmad Nasser was re-elected on 25 October 2013 for a new two-year term, as the two-year term by incumbent president Massaad Hajal expired. Following that, Peter Achkar was elected president in 2015 and in October 2017, Consul Ramzi Haidar.
- Historical opposition jurisdiction since the 1990s presently under the presidency of Elias Kassab. The presidents in this faction have been Bechara Bechara, Joe Beayni, Anis Karabet, Elie Hakmeh, Eid Chedrawi (elected Oct 26, 2009 in Mexico City), Michel Doueihi (elected March 27, 2012 in Mexico City), Alejandro Kuri Pheres (elected March 2014, in Buenos Aires) and incumbent Elias Kassab (elected April 4, 2016 in Toronto).
- Newly established opposition jurisdiction since the congress of 2010. This is under the presidency of Albert Matta after a splinter congress held on September 18, 2010, by some of the dissenting membership of traditional WLCU/Ahmad Nasser organization.
