= Anwar M. El-Khalil =

Member of the Parliament of Lebanon

Anwar El-Khalil
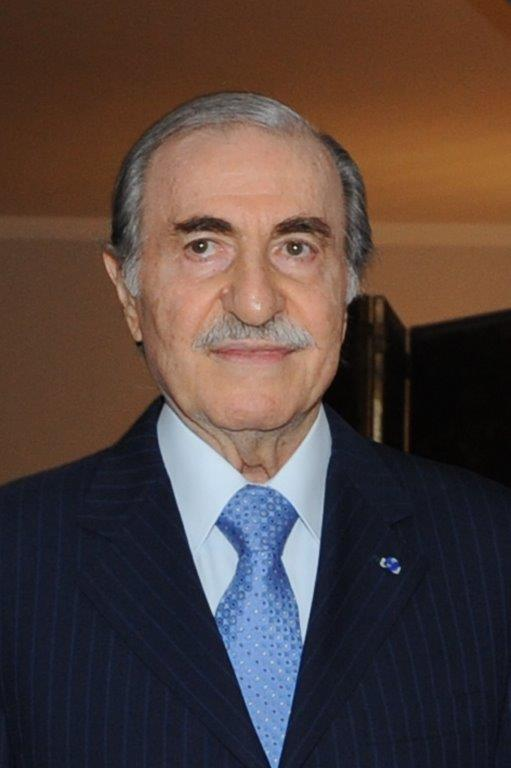
- Born: March 8, 1938 (age 88); Lagos, Nigeria
- Occupations: Politician and Businessman
- Political party: Amal Movement
- Spouse: Layla Zayd Al-Atrash
- Children: 4

Anwar M. El-Khalil (born 9 March 1938) is a Lebanese politician and former member of the Lebanese Parliament representing the Marjeyoun-Hasbaya district.

== Early life and education ==
Anwar M. El-Khalil was born on 9 March 1938 in Lagos, Nigeria to a Druze family. He graduated from the International College-IC (Secondary School-1953) and from the American University of Beirut (1956). He got post graduate studies in London, UCL (1959) and a Barrister-at-Law – Member of the Honorable Society of the Middle Temple – London.

== Career ==
Anwar M. El-Khalil owns and Chairs a number of companies in Lebanon and abroad

- Chairman of M. El-Khalil Transport Ltd., Nigeria
- Chairman of M. El-Khalil & Sons (Properties) Ltd., Nigeria
- Chairman of Seven-Up Bottling Co., Nigeria 1960 to 1990
- Managing Director of Beirut Riyadh Bank s.a.l. 1972 to 1995
- Chairman – General Manager of Beirut Riyadh Bank s.a.l. 1995 to 2002
- Chairman – General Manager of Arabian Touristic and Real Estate Co Ltd. (ATRICO) Beirut, Lebanon
- Member of the Board of Directors of Bank of Beirut s.a.l from 2003 to 2022
- Chairman of MAK Holdings (Lebanon) s.a.l since 2004 to present
- Chairman of Continental Beverages s.a.l (Holding) since 2006 to present
- Chairman of Continental Beverages s.a.l (Offshore) since 2007 to present
- Chairman of MAK Holdings Ltd. Since 2008 to present

== Political life ==
- Member of Lebanese Parliament from 1991 to present
- Minister of State for Parliamentary Affairs 1992 to 1995
- Minister of State for Administrative Reform 1995 to 1996
- Minister of Information 1998 to 2000
- Minister of the Displaced 1998 to 2000

=== Member ===
- Parliamentary Committee of Defense, Internal Affairs and Municipalities
- Parliamentary Committee of Budget and Finance Committee.
- Parliamentary Committee of Women and Children
- Parliamentary Committee of Administration and Justice

=== Lebanese Parliamentary Committees ===
==== Chairman ====
- Lebanese-Swiss Friendship Parliamentary Committee
- Lebanese-Argentinian Friendship Parliamentary Committee
- Lebanese-Nigerian Friendship Parliamentary Committee

==== Member ====
- Lebanese-Spanish Friendship Parliamentary Committee
- Lebanese-Swedish Friendship Parliamentary Committee
- Lebanese-European Friendship Parliamentary Committee

== Other activities ==
- Founder of the Lebanese Community School Nigeria and president of its board of trustees
- President of "World Lebanese Cultural Union" 1971 to 1973
- Member of the Board of Directors of Chamber of Commerce & Industry, Beirut 1973 to 1979
- Deputy Chairman of the Board of Trustees of the Druze Community Health Foundation
- President of Union of Arab Banks 1983 to 1989 (an association of all banks in the Arab World)
- President of the Union of Arab Banks 1983 to 1989
- Honorary President for life of El-Khalil Foundation since 2003
- Founder and Chairman of the Arab Institute for Banking studies (Amman)

== Honours ==
- Holder of the Lebanese Government National Cedar Medal – Commander Rank – 1974
- Holder of the Kingdom of Spain Royal decoration – 2011

== Personal life ==
El-Khalil married to Layla Zayd Al-Atrash in 1961. The couple had four sons: Imad (born 1963), Ziad (born 1964), Fadi (born 1969) and Naji (born 1972).

== See also ==
- Lebanese Parliament
- Members of the 2009-2013 Lebanese Parliament
