= Chagoury =

Chagoury is a surname. Notable people with the surname include:

- Gilbert Chagoury (born 1946), Lebanese-Nigerian businessman, diplomat, and philanthropist
- Ronald Chagoury (born 1949), Nigerian businessman

== See also ==
- Chagoury Group, a Nigerian multinational business conglomerate
