= Abatiade =

Nigerian dancer and actor (born 1998)

- Born: Abati Adeotan Abidemi; February 8, 1998 (age 28)
- Education: Barachel Model College; Kwara State University
- Occupations: Dancer, choreographer, actor, producer
- Years active: 2015–present
- Known for: Abati OldTaker; Aiyetoro Town

Abati Adeotan Abidemi (born February 8, 1998) better known as Abatiade is a Nigerian dancer, actor, social media personality and choreographer. He is best known for his television role as Akéwì in the FAAN series Aiyetoro Town (2019 to 2025).

== Early life ==
Abati Adeotan Abidemi was born on 8 February 1998. He is from Abeokuta, Ogun State, Nigeria. Abidemi attended Hubert Ogunde Memorial School for his early education. where he was first introduced to ballet dance through a school program. He later moved on to Barachel Model College for his secondary education, and around this same time he trained at the Foot Print of David Art Academy in Bariga. He graduated from Kwara State University (KWASU) in 2020.

== Career ==
Abatiade was discovered at school when he was 17 by Seun Awobajo, as a ballet dancer. He performed at the Wole Soyinka Vision Of The Child Art Exhibition, Lagos Civic Centre. He also performed at the inauguration party of Governor Akinwunmi Ambode the same year. Abatiade made his on-screen debut portraying Carnival dancer in the 2020 Nigerian gangster comedy film Omo Ghetto: The Saga.

In 2021, he co-created the Focus Dance, which went viral on Social media. It was later performed by musicians including Davido and footballers Paul Pogba and Jesse Lingard. On September 8, 2025, he became the first African TikTok Live creator to earn more than 700,000 diamonds through livestream. He was cast as Abati in the Yoruba Drama film TikTok Live and played the role of the King Hype Man (Akéwi) in comedy drama series Aiyetoro Town. In 2025 he played the lead role of Abati in the comedy Web series Abati OldTaker. In March 2026, he announced his first media and club tour in Ghana.

== Filmography ==
=== Film ===
Year	Title	Role	Notes
2020	Omo Ghetto: The Saga	Dancer	
2025	TikTok Live	Abati	Yoruba Movie Drama

=== Television ===
Year	Title	Role	Notes
2021	Jenifa on lockdown		
2025	Abati OldTaker	Abati	Main role
2019–2026	Aiyetoro Town	Akéwi	5 episodes

=== Film score ===
- Abati OldTaker (2025)

== Theatre credits ==
Year	Title	Role	Venue
2015	Wole Soyinka Vision Of The Child Art Exhibition	Ballet dancer	Lagos Civic Centre
