= Banana Island, Lagos =

Banana Island
- City
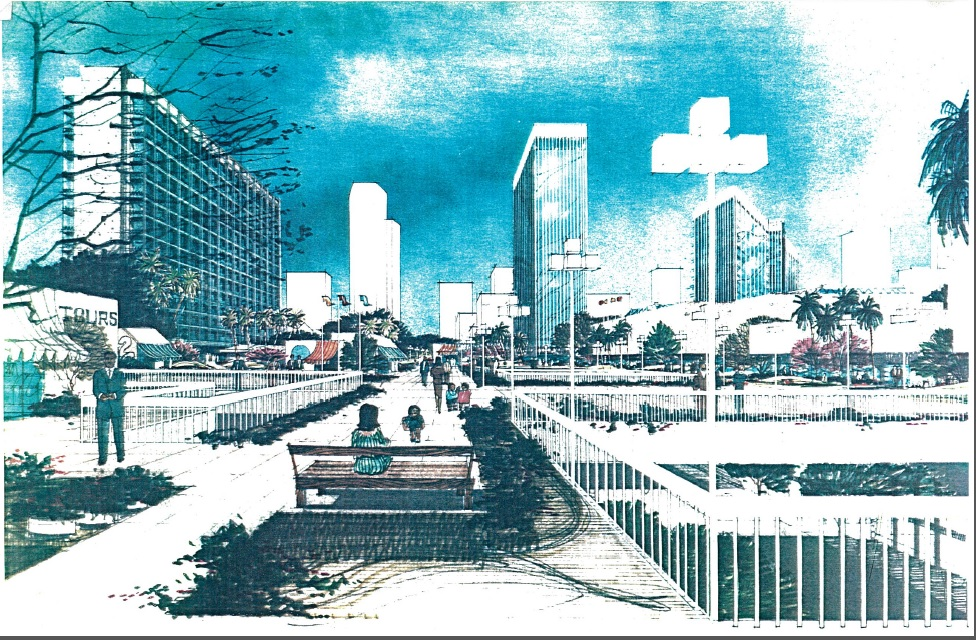
- Architectural drawing of Lagoon City

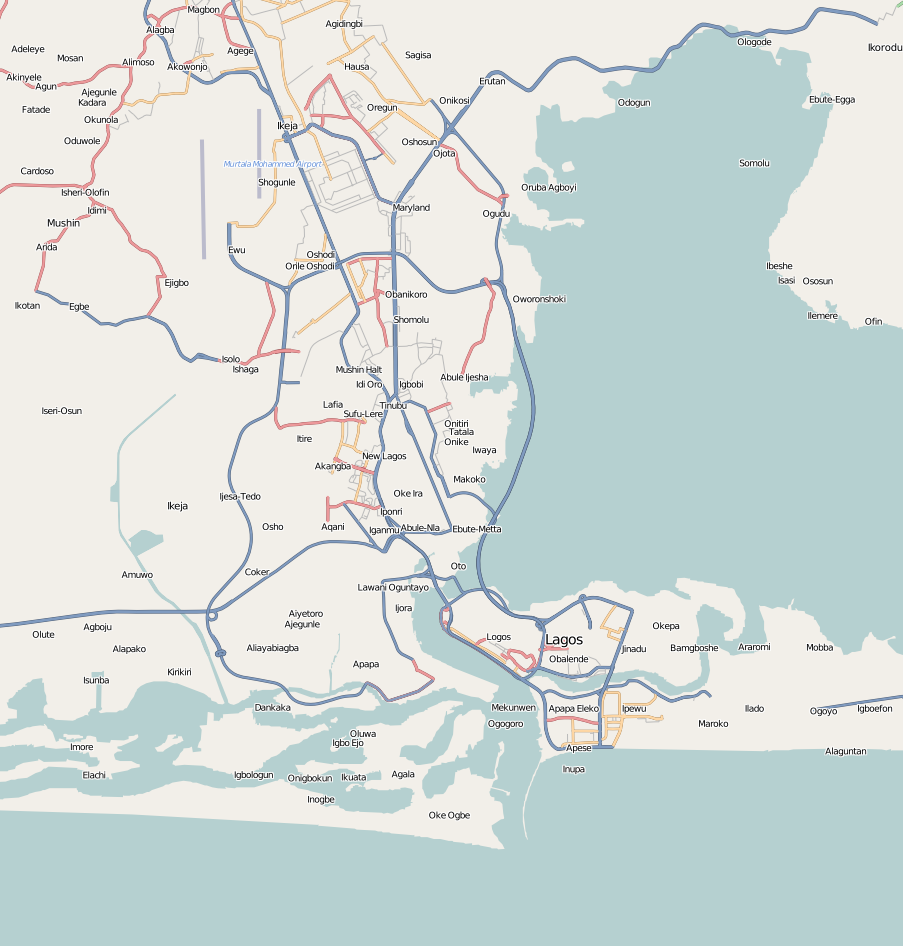
- Location in Lagos
- Coordinates: 6°28′N 3°27′E
- Country: Nigeria
- State: Lagos State
- City: Lagos
- LGA: Eti-Osa
- Neighbourhood: Ikoyi
- Time zone: UTC+1 (WAT)

Banana Island is an artificial island off the foreshore of Ikoyi, Lagos, Nigeria. Its name is derived from the curvature of its shape. The island is a planned, mixed development with residential, commercial and recreational buildings.

== History ==
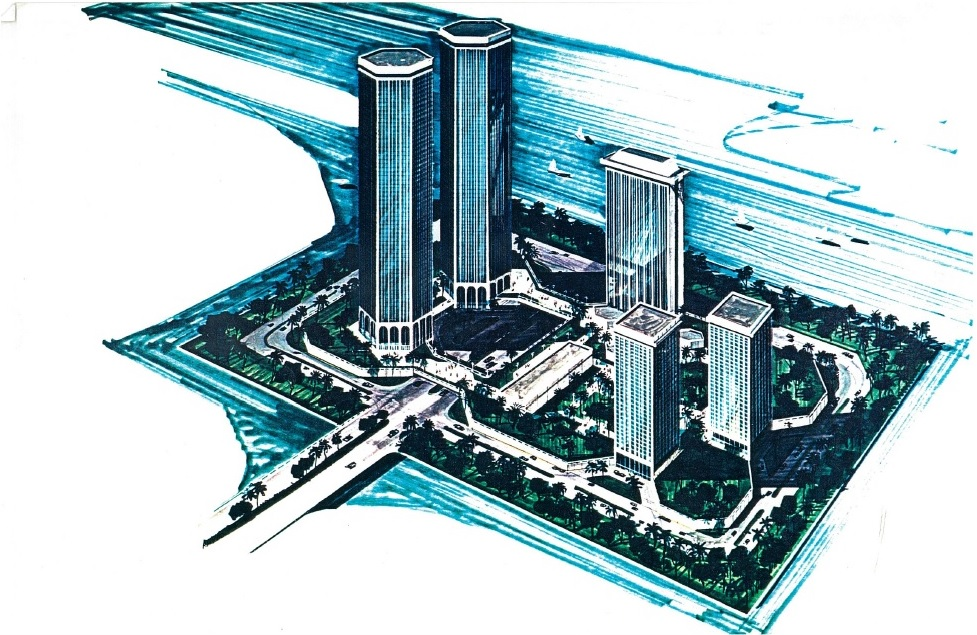
Lagoon City-Twin Towers - Adeleke/Yamasaki

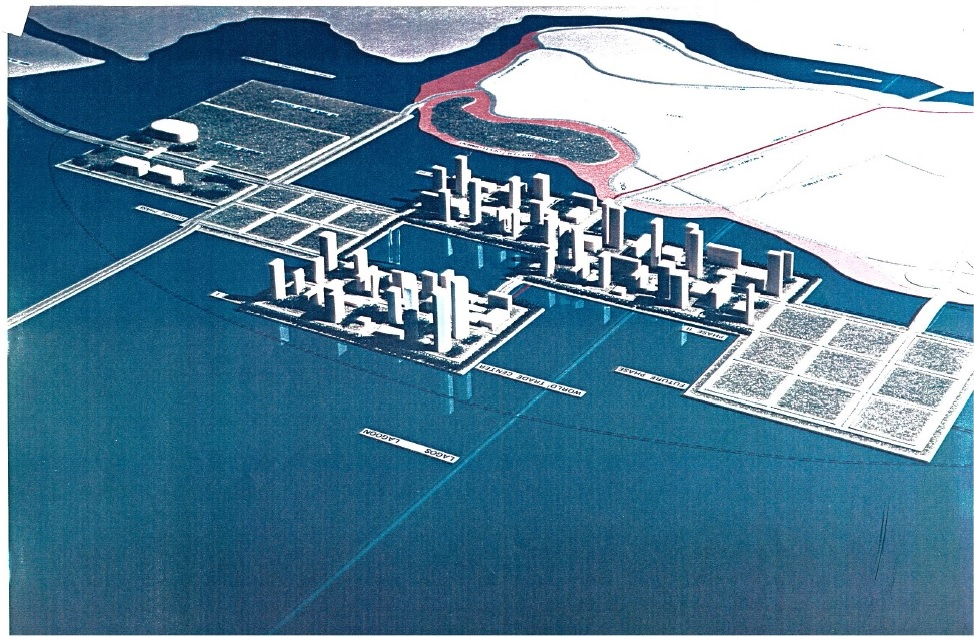
Lagoon City - Aerial Shots

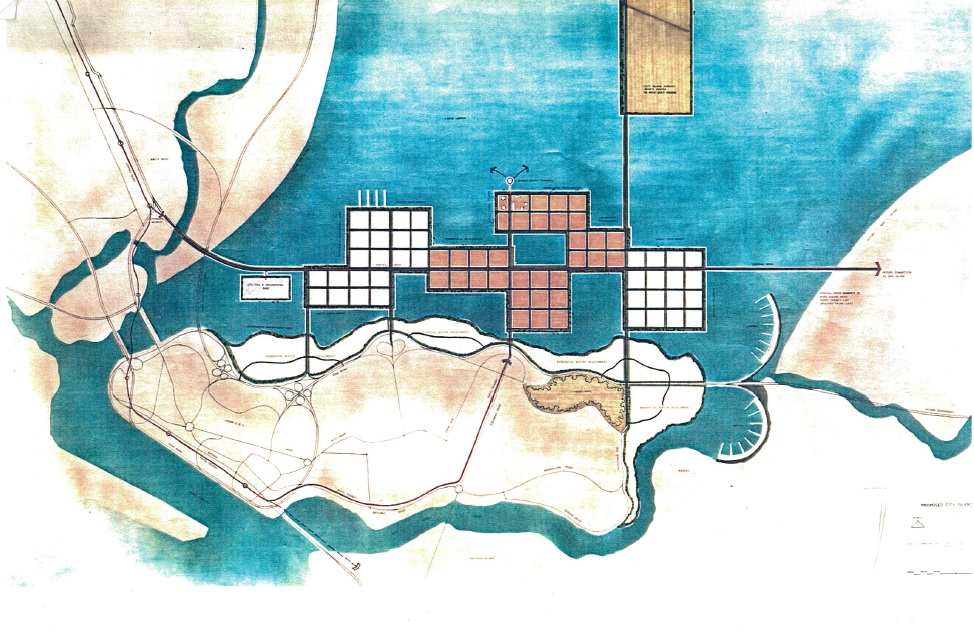
Lagoon City - Architectural Plans

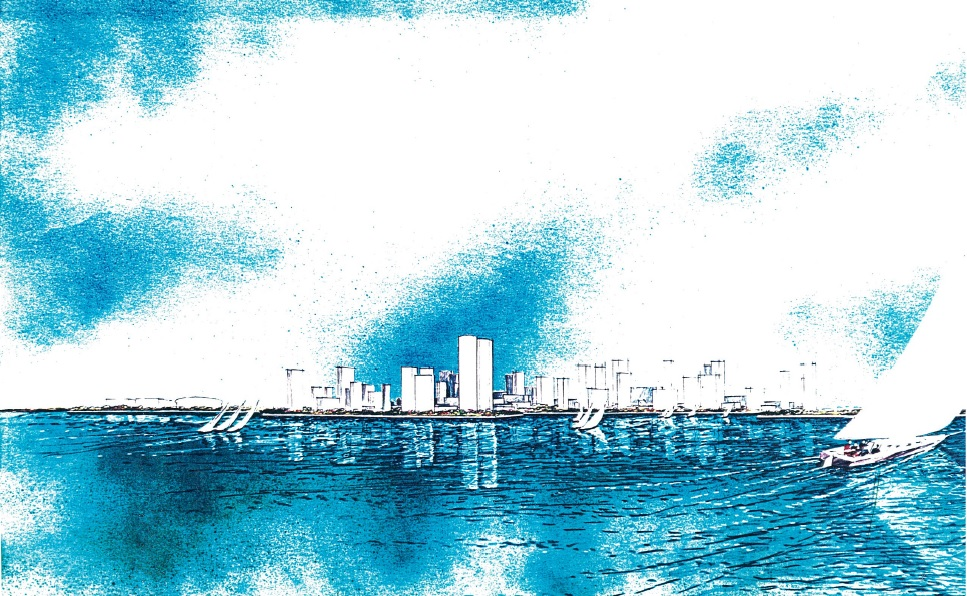
Lagoon City - Lagoon Side View

The original Banana Island construction project entitled Lagoon City was the brainchild of the late Chief Adebayo Adeleke, a University of London trained Civil Engineer (MICE), and CEO of City Property Development Ltd.

Adeleke had originally commissioned a new urban development in Maroko, Victoria Island, but that project had been acquired by the Lagos State government. Following a lengthy 10 year court case, Lagos State government offered other parcels of land as consideration for the Maroko development.

== Design ==
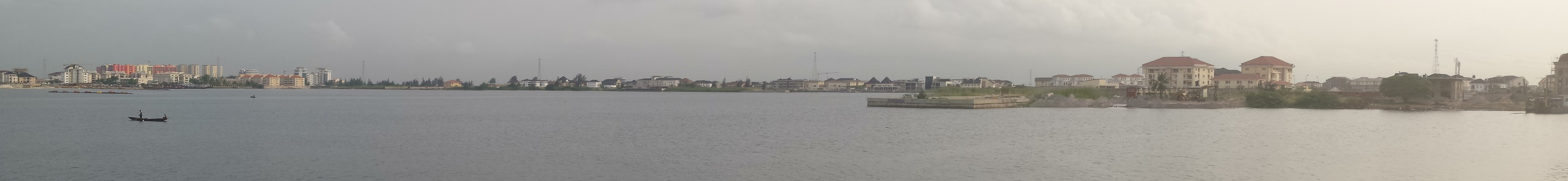
Panoramic view of Banana Island taken from the Lekki-Ikoyi Link Bridge.

Banana Island is a man-made island in Lagos State, Nigeria that is slightly curved in shape – like a banana. It is located in the Lagos Lagoon and is connected to Ikoyi Island by a dedicated road which is linked to the existing road network near Parkview Estate. The island was constructed by the Lebanese-Nigerian Chagoury Group in partnership with the Federal Ministry of Power, Works and Housing, and is considered to be on-par with the 7th arrondissement of Paris, La Jolla, California (in San Diego), and Tokyo's Shibuya and Roppongi neighbourhoods.

It occupies a sand-filled area of approximately 1,630,000 square metres and is divided into 536 plots (of between 1000 and 4000 square metres in size), mainly arranged along cul-de-sacs, designed as to enhance the historically residential nature of Ikoyi. Residents are provided with utilities, including underground electrical systems (versus the overhead cabling common throughout Lagos), an underground water supply network, a central sewage system/treatment plant, street lighting and satellite telecommunications networks.

The Island is a planned, mixed development, with dedicated areas for residential, commercial and recreational activities. On the residential side of the Island, planning permission is not granted for dwellings over 3 storeys high. The developers also intend to develop a main piazza, a club-house, a primary and secondary school, a fire and police station and a medical clinic. They are also negotiating to build a 5-star hotel on the island, along with an array of smaller Guest Houses.

== Composition ==
Banana Island hosts several high end residential developments such as Ocean Parade Towers - a series of 14 luxury tower blocks strategically situated at one end of the island to take advantage of 180 degree panoramic views overlooking the lagoon. Similar to many of the developments on the island, it has dedicated leisure facilities such as a private health club - with tennis courts, squash courts and a swimming pool surrounded by extensive gardens. At launch flats in Ocean Parade sold for over US$400,000.

Several leading Nigerian and International corporates such as - Etisalat Nigeria, Airtel Nigeria, Ford Foundation Nigeria and Olaniwun Ajayi & Co - are also based on Banana Island.

== Notable residents ==
- Mike Adenuga - billionaire businessman
- Aliko Dangote - billionaire businessman
- Davido - Afrobeats artist
- Linda Ikeji - model and blogger
- Iyabo Obasanjo - former Nigerian senator
