= Omo Ghetto: The Saga =

2020 Nigerian comedy film

- Promotional poster
- Directed by: JJC Skillz; Funke Akindele
- Screenplay by: Funke Akindele; Yinka Adebayo; Collins Okoh
- Story by: Funke Akindele
- Produced by: Funke Akindele; Wendy Uwadiae Imasuen
- Starring: Funke Akindele; Chioma Akpotha; Nancy Isime; Eniola Badmus; Bimbo Thomas; Mercy Aigbe; Deyemi Okanlawon; Timini Egbuson; Alex Ekubo
- Cinematography: John Dems
- Edited by: JJC Skillz; Valentine Chukwuma; Adeyemi Adeshomade
- Production company: Scene One Productions
- Distributed by: FilmOne Distribution
- Release date: 25 December 2020
- Running time: 110 minutes
- Country: Nigeria
- Languages: English, Yoruba, Igbo, Hausa, Nigerian Pidgin
- Box office: ₦636.1 million

Omo Ghetto: The Saga also known as Omo Ghetto 2 is a 2020 Nigerian gangster comedy film co-directed by Funke Akindele and JJC Skillz. The film stars Funke Akindele, Chioma Akpota, Nancy Isime, Eniola Badmus, Bimbo Thomas, Deyemi Okanlawon and Mercy Aigbe in the lead roles. This was the second film in the Omo Ghetto franchise and it was also the sequel to the 2010 trilogy film Omo Ghetto. The film had its theatrical release coinciding with Christmas on 25 December 2020 and was opened to extremely positive reviews from critics. The film became a box office success and surpassed Fate of Alakada as the highest-grossing Nigerian film for the year 2020.

As of 26 January 2021, when the film grossed ₦468 million at the box office, it surpassed the record of the 2016 film The Wedding Party to become the highest ever grossing film in the Nigerian film industry.

== Plot ==
Lefty (also known as Shalewa) is one of the twin sisters together with Ayomide, separated during their childhood. While Ayomide is adopted by Mrs. Benson and brought up comfortably in Lagos Island, Lefty grew up in the Askamaya ghetto. As an adult, Lefty is introduced to her sister and taken in by Mrs. Benson, yet she struggles to fit in upper class society and continues going back to Askamaya, where she is still connected with her friends Busty, Nikky, and Chummy Choko, referred to as the Askamaya Bees.

Lefty, when living in the ghetto, is romantically involved with Femi Stone who is the leader of a cybercrime syndicate which includes his associates: Obi Wire, Mario, and Aza Man. Femi was previously helping Lefty in escaping from a difficult situation by clearing her debt and thus made her more loyal to him. Femi and his associates defraud their victims, including their foreign customers, online.

Femi drugs their rival and robs a laptop from him; this event leads to his death. After that Femi tries to frame Lefty for another murder planting the victim's phone in her car; therefore, Lefty is arrested.

Even being arrested, Lefty decides not to blame Femi and protect him despite the situation. Ayomide tries to help her sister to clear her name. It becomes clear later that Femi was taking advantage of Lefty financially while being in a romantic relation with a foreign client whom he plans to escape with.

Both sisters manage to defeat Femi and his associates.

== Cast ==
- Funke Akindele as Lefty (Shalewa) & Ayomide
- Bimbo Thomas as Nikky
- Eniola Badmus as Busty
- Chioma Akpotha as Chummy Choko
- Deyemi Okanlawon as Femi Stone
- Nancy Isime as Kate
- Alex Ekubo as Obi Wire
- Zubby Michael as Azaman
- Akah Nnani as Mario
- Tina Mba as Mrs Benson
- Blossom Chukwujekwu as Officer Dede
- Chigurl as Amaka
- Yemi Alade as Mogambe
- Mercy Aigbe as Prisca
- Ayo Makun as Dafe
- Timini Egbuson as Don Cash
- Tobi Makinde as Ay Pomping
- Paschaline Alex Okoli
- Ronya Man as Rose
- Esther Kalejaiye as Omo Joyoibo
- Slimcase as Jago
- Ibrahim Yekini as Jericho
- Femi Jacobs as Fred
- Adebayo Salami as Baba Onibaba
- Shina Peters as Shina Peters (self)
- David Jones David as Oscar
- Martinsfeelz as Ojuna Boy
- Toke Makinwa as Tina
- Broda Shaggi as Dele
- Collins Talker as Eruku
- Abati Adeotan Abidemi as Carnival Dancer
- Tega Akpobome (og.tega)
- Naira Marley (cameo appearance)

== Production ==
Akindele confirmed the production of the sequel in February 2020 with a throwback photo of herself along with Eniola Badmus in an Instagram post. The principal photography of the film also commenced in February 2020. The film project also marked the maiden collaboration between Funke Akindele and her then husband JJC Skillz as co-directors of the film. Some of the portions of the film were shot in Dubai, United Arab Emirates and the film production was also affected by the COVID-19 pandemic.

Popular singer Naira Marley was roped into playing a cameo appearance in the film and made his film acting debut through this film. Yemi Alade, the singer, also made her acting debut through this film as she landed a pivotal role.

== Reception ==
=== Box office ===
The film grossed over ₦189 million in the opening week of its release and historically became the first Nollywood film ever to gross over ₦99 million in its opening weekend, surpassing the previous record set by The Wedding Party 2. In its second week, the movie continued breaking box office records by grossing over ₦132.4 million and firmly staying at the top of the Nigerian box office and bringing its 2-week gross to a record breaking ₦322 million and placing it as the fourth highest grossing Nigerian movie of all time.

In its third week, despite seeing a drop of 43% from the previous week, Omo Ghetto still topped the box office and grossed ₦75.4 million bringing its total cumulative to ₦398.5 million just after three weeks. Omo Ghetto was so popular that it accounted for about 65% of the box office in Nigeria. Omo Ghetto kept dominating the Nigerian box office, raking up ₦45.9 million to top the box office. It brought the cumulative box office figure to ₦444.5 million, placing it as the second highest grossing Nollywood film of all time after just four weeks. Omo Ghetto the saga is currently the highest grossing Nigerian movie of all time with ₦468,036,300 in just over a month

Omo Ghetto continued dominating the box office in its fifth week grossing ₦35.7 million thus bringing its cumulative to ₦480.5 million and becoming the highest grossing Nollywod movie of all time despite the COVID-19 pandemic. The film continued to extend its record by becoming the first Nollywood movie to stay six consecutive weeks at the top of the box office, grossing an additional ₦31.5 million. It also historically became the first ever Nigerian film to gross ₦500 million in the Nollywood box office.

The film remained top at the box office in its seventh week, grossing an additional ₦27.3 million. bringing its cumulative to ₦539.6. Omo Ghetto topped the box office in its eighth, ninth and tenth week respectively becoming only the second movie in English-speaking West Africa to cross the ₦600 million mark after Black Panther.

=== Critical response ===
Yousuph Grey of Premium Times gave the film a score of 8.5/10 praising Funke Akindele's Dual role as Lefty and Ayomide and also for its positive and warm depiction of ghetto life, which is different from movies that tend to condemn ghetto lifestyle. Grey also stated that despite the toughness of Lefty, She is a person of strong moral values. Also highlighting the chemistry among the actors, especially Lefty's and Askamaya Bees' group of people and his rivals – Femi Stone's group of frauds. According to the Grey, the first act of the movie was slow compared to other acts of the movie. In a similar review by Fridous Adetutu of What Kept Me Up also praised Funke Akindele's dual performance as Lefty and Ayomide and the film's mix of Yoruba, Igbo, Hausa, Edo, Pidgin, and English for its naturalistic feel. The review noted a subplot on police harassment of suspected internet fraudsters as echoing wider debate around the End SARS protests, while criticising the final fight scene's choreography and calling a rival-gang brawl subplot unnecessary.

== Awards and nominations ==
Year	Award	Category	Recipient	Result	Ref
2021	Africa Movie Academy Awards	Best Actress in a Leading Role	Funke Akindele	Nominated	
2021	Africa Movie Academy Awards	Achievement in Editing	Omo Ghetto	Nominated	
2021	Africa Movie Academy Awards	Best Nigerian Film	Omo Ghetto	Nominated	
2022	Africa Magic Viewers' Choice Awards	Best Actress in A Comedy	Funke Akindele	Won	
2022	Africa Magic Viewers' Choice Awards	Best Costume Designer	Funke Akindele	Nominated	
2022	Africa Magic Viewers' Choice Awards	Best Actor in A Comedy	Deyemi Okanlawon	Nominated	
2022	Africa Magic Viewers' Choice Awards	Best Supporting Actress in Movie/ Television Series	Chioma Akpotha	Nominated	
2022	Africa Magic Viewers' Choice Awards	Best Make-Up	Abiodun Balogun	Won	
2022	Africa Magic Viewers' Choice Awards	Best Picture Editor	JJC Skillz, Valentine Chkukwuma, Adeyemi Shomade	Nominated	
2022	Africa Magic Viewers' Choice Awards	Best Sound Editor	Puffy Tee	Nominated	
2022	Africa Magic Viewers' Choice Awards	Best Movie West Africa	Funke Akindele & JJC Skillz	Nominated	
2022	Africa Magic Viewers' Choice Awards	Best Overall Movie	Funke Akindele & JJC Skillz	Nominated	
