= Eko Pearl Towers =

Residential complex in Lagos State, Nigeria

- Interactive map of the Eko Pearl Towers area

General information
- Status: Topped-out; Topped-out; Proposed (Note: Black and Champagne Pearl Towers have been topped out. White Pearl Tower is under construction. The other two towers are still under development)
- Type: residential
- Architectural style: Postmodern
- Location: Downtown, Eko Atlantic, Lagos State, Nigeria
- Coordinates: 6.4098°N 3.4120°E
- Construction started: Eko Black Pearl : 2013; Eko Champagne Pearl: 2013; Eko White Pearl: TBD; Eko Indigo Pearl: TBD; Eko Aqua Pearl: TBD
- Completed: Eko Black Pearl: 2016; Eko Champagne Pearl:2017; Eko White Pearl: TBA; Eko Indigo Pearl: TBA; Eko Aqua Pearl: TBA
- Opened: 2016

Height
- Roof: Eko Black Pearl: 112 m (367 ft); Eko Champagne Pearl: 134 m (440 ft); Eko White Pearl: TBD; Eko Indigo Pearl: TBD; Eko Aqua Pearl: TBD

Technical details
- Material: glass, steel, aluminum, concrete reinforced
- Floor count: Eko Black Pearl: 24; Eko Champagne Pearl: 30; Eko White Pearl: 31; Eko Indigo Pearl: 33; Eko Aqua Pearl: 24

Design and construction
- Architect: Tabet Atelier d'Architecture
- Developer: ESLA (Elias Saad Leading Association) International
- Main contractor: South Energyx Nigeria Ltd, Eko Pearl Construction Company

Website
- Eko Pearl

Eko Pearl Towers is a complex which consists of five residential towers in Eko Atlantic, Lagos State.

== Design and development ==
The Eko Pearl Towers comprises five residential skyscrapers, all ranging from 24 to 33 floors. The towers are Eko Black Pearl, Eko White Pearl, Champagne Pearl, Indigo Pearl and Aqua Pearl. The residential tower project was designed by the Architecture firm TAA (Tabet Atelier d Architecture), the Electrical/Mechanical consultants are DHD-MEP Design and Supervision and the structural engineering was conducted by several Lebanese people. Construction Management was tasked to TAA construction and the Site Engineering consultants are APAVE Nigeria. The residential towers are being developed by ESLA International Limited, a subsidiary of Chagoury Group, while the contractors are Eko Pearl Construction Company and South Energyx Nigeria Ltd. Each of the five towers comprises four flats per floor, two flats on the penthouse floors, a technical floor, terrace floor, a ground floor and a basement floor. The penthouse types, two and three bedroom flats provide viewing access to the Lagos coastline. The five towers cover a total plot area of 22,738m^{2}. Altogether, the towers will provide approximately over 560 flat units with views of the Atlantic Ocean, Victoria Island and Lagos Island. The project commenced after the land reclamation for the first phase of Eko Atlantic in 2013. As of 2016, the Black pearl has been topped out, the Champagne Pearl was scheduled to be completed in 2017 and has been topped out, whilst the other two towers are still under development. The project was initiated in 2013, with an estimated completion and opening date initially scheduled for 2016. However, the 2016 date could not be attained for all the towers during construction process of the project. The towers are accessed by Eko Boulevard, Nigeria’s first eight-lane city road.

=== Eko Black Pearl ===
The Black Pearl residential tower is a 24-floor flat building. The tower contains 84 flats, which range in size from 1 to 3 bedrooms, with Duplex options, combined flats and Terrace Penthouses. The Eko Black Pearl Tower which was topped out in 2016 and is close to the much taller Champagne Pearl which is a 33 floors residential tower with similar attributes to the Black Pearl. Both towers are situated behind two tennis courts, a swimming pool and other communal facilities. There are also parking available in all the towers at the ground and basement levels.

=== Eko White Pearl ===
The White Pearl tower consists of 31 residential floors and benefits from the common garden terrace at the top of the podium and has a private health club, a meeting room and lounge at the garden floor level. The White Pearl Tower has a two level podium which has a lobby and garden terrace above. The ground floor level incorporates a private health club, meeting room and a luxurious lounge. 24 levels will be accessible by 6 Mitsubishi elevators.

=== Eko Champagne Pearl ===
The Champagne Pearl tower consists of 30 residential floors; there are 4 flats per floor, a technical floor, a ground floor and a basement floor. The Eko Champagne Pearl Tower which was topped out in 2017 is currently the tallest residential building in Nigeria. As of January 2021, it is the second tallest building in Nigeria.

=== Eko Indigo Pearl ===
The Indigo Pearl tower will consist of 33 residential floors.

=== Eko Aqua Pearl ===
The Aqua Pearl tower will consist of 24 residential floors. (Note: All towers access a common garden terrace at the top of the podium, have private health cubs, leisure facilities, meeting rooms and lounge.)

== See also ==
- List of tallest buildings in Nigeria
