= List of tallest buildings in Nigeria =

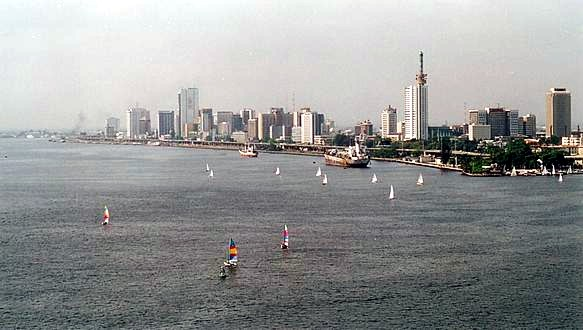
Skyline of Lagos, Nigeria’s largest financial center and entertainment hub.

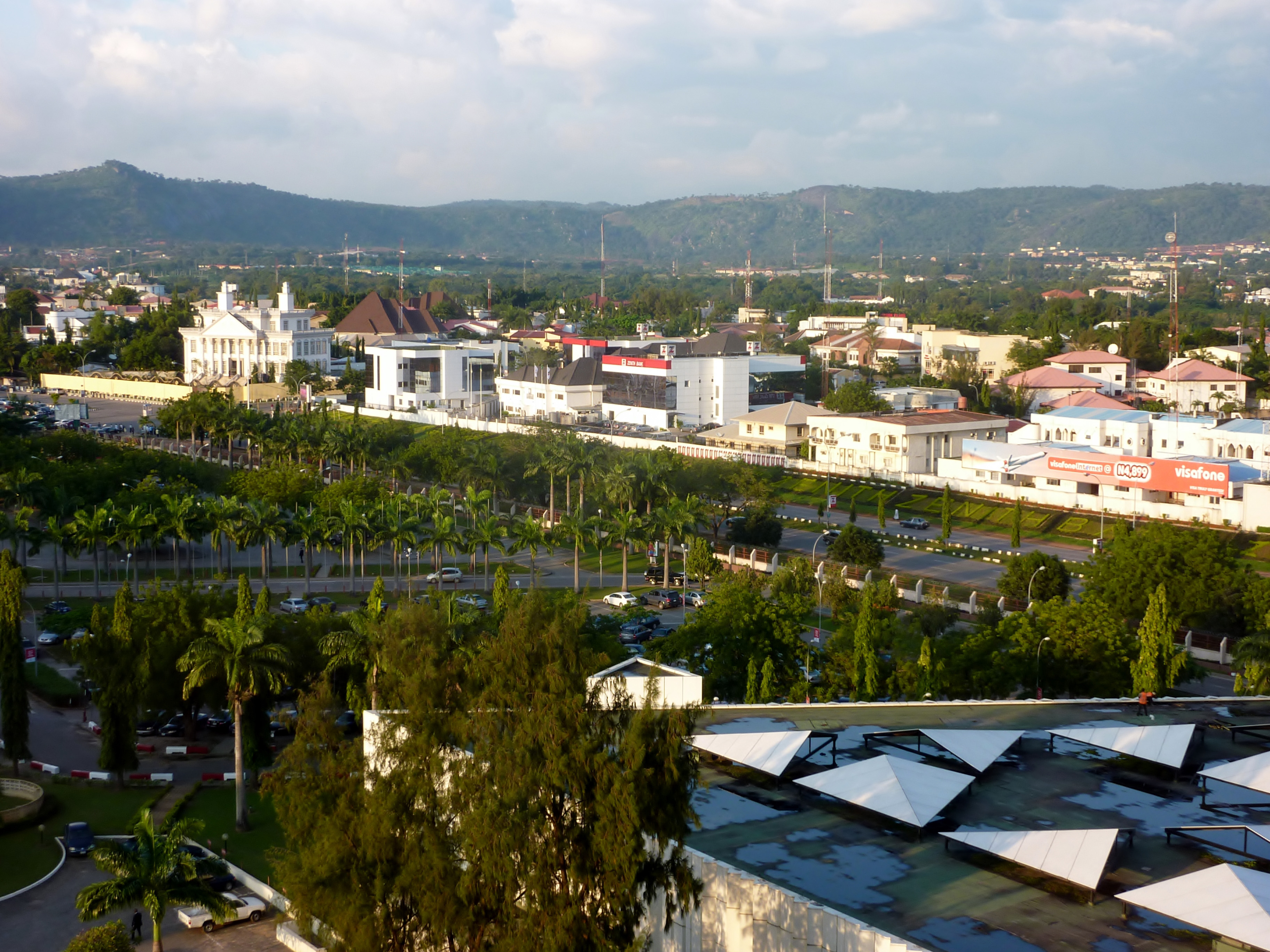
Abuja, Nigeria's capital city.

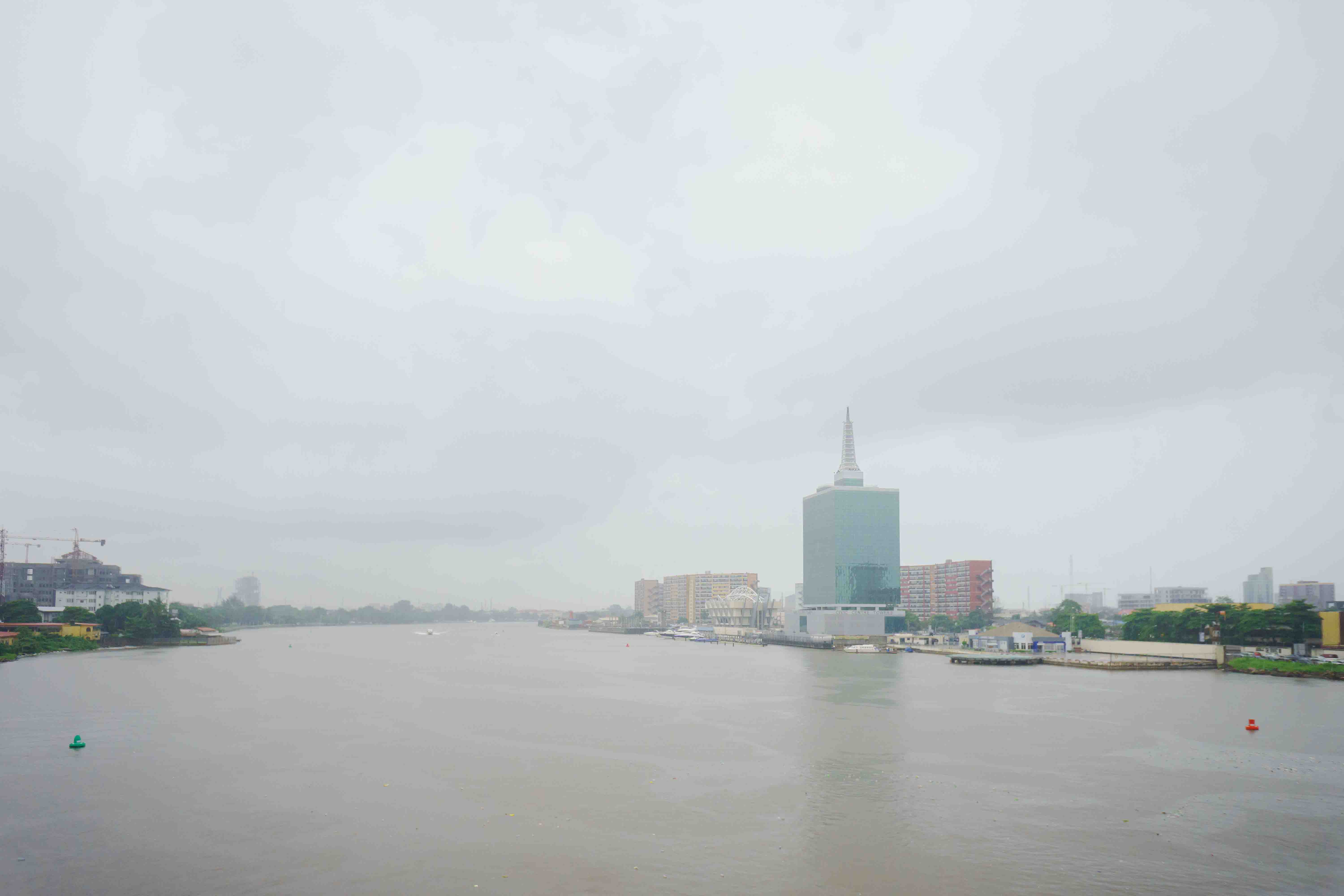
Rear view of the Civic Towers in Lagos.

Nigeria is the most populous country and one of the most economically developed nations in Africa. However, the concentration of high-rise buildings and large-scale construction projects is largely limited to Lagos, Abuja, and Eko Atlantic, which have experienced rapid urban growth in recent years. At 160 m (520 ft), the NECOM House is the tallest building in Nigeria, comprising 32 floors.

== Tallest buildings ==
This list ranks buildings in Nigeria that are at least 60 m (197 ft) tall, based on standard height measurements. The ranking includes spires and architectural features, but excludes antenna masts.

Was the tallest building in Nigeria upon completion

Building	Height	Floors	Completed	City
NECOM House	160 m (520 ft)	32	1979	Lagos
Champagne Pearl Tower	134 m (440 ft)	34	2017	Eko Atlantic
Azuri Towers	129 m (423 ft)	30	2017	Eko Atlantic
Union Bank Building	124 m (407 ft)	28	1991	Lagos
WTC Tower 2	120 m (390 ft)	25	2016	Abuja
Eko Tower II	118 m (387 ft)	27	2016	Lagos
Black Pearl Tower	112 m (367 ft)	25	2017	Eko Atlantic
4 Bourdillon	110 m (360 ft)	25	2020	Lagos
WTC Tower 1	110 m (360 ft)	24	2016	Abuja
Ministry of Communication Building	109 m (358 ft)	30	N/A	Lagos
Dakkada Towers	108.8 m (357 ft)	21	2020	Uyo
FAMFA Office Tower	107 m (351 ft)	20	2022	Lagos
Cuddle by Cadwell	105 m (344 ft)	18	2021	Lagos
Cocoa House	105 m (344 ft)	26	1965	Ibadan
Lagos Continental Hotel	105 m (344 ft)	22	2013	Lagos
Independence House	103 m (338 ft)	23	1960	Lagos
Quantum Luxury Towers	100 m (330 ft)	25	2026	Lagos
CBN Lagos	100 m (330 ft)	19	2013	Lagos
Great Nigeria House	95 m (312 ft)	22	??	Lagos
CBN Headquarters	94 m (308 ft)	11	2002	Abuja
Civic Centre Towers	90 m (300 ft)	13	2015	Lagos
Eko Court A	88 m (289 ft)	24	??	Lagos
Eko Court B	88 m (289 ft)	24	??	Lagos
Eko Court C	88 m (289 ft)	24	??	Lagos
National Oil Headquarters	83 m (272 ft)	23	1984	Lagos
Stock Exchange House	83 m (272 ft)	22	??	Lagos
UBA House	80 m (260 ft)	20	??	Lagos
Conoil House	80 m (260 ft)	22	??	Lagos
Eagle House	78 m (256 ft)	20	1985	Lagos
NNPC Building 1	75 m (246 ft)	15	1996	Abuja
NNPC Building 2	75 m (246 ft)	15	1996	Abuja
NNPC Building 3	75 m (246 ft)	15	1996	Abuja
NNPC Building 4	75 m (246 ft)	15	1996	Abuja
Nestoil Towers	75 m (246 ft)	16	2015	Lagos
Afribank Plaza	73 m (240 ft)	19	1998	Lagos
Zenith Heights	73 m (240 ft)	17	2006	Lagos
Wema Tower	73 m (240 ft)	20	??	Lagos
Freeman House	70 m (230 ft)	18	??	Lagos
Unity House	69 m (226 ft)	19	??	Lagos
Sterling Tower	66 m (217 ft)	18	??	Lagos
Eleganza House	65 m (213 ft)	18	??	Lagos
Nicon House	65 m (213 ft)	18	1986	Lagos
Financial Trust House	65 m (213 ft)	18	??	Lagos
Bank of the North		17	??	Kano
Kanti Tower

== Under construction, approved, or proposed ==
This section lists skyscrapers in Nigeria that are under construction, approved, or proposed and are planned to rise over 100 m (328 ft) tall, but have not yet been completed.

Name	Height m / ft	Floors	Estimated Completion	City	Status	Notes
Nigeria Elevation Tower	377 m (1,237 ft)	75	TBA	Lagos	Proposed	
Africa Square and Tower	308 m (1,010 ft)	70	TBA	Abuja	Proposed	
Lady Marina	300 m (980 ft)	65	TBA	Lagos	Proposed	
FirstBank Head Office Building	252 m (827 ft)	43	2029	Eko Atlantic	Under Construction	
Oculus Grande	178 m (584 ft)	35	TBA	Lagos	Proposed	
Eko White Pearl Tower	165 m (541 ft)	31	TBA	Eko Atlantic	Proposed	
World Trade Center Hotel Tower	158 m (518 ft)	37	TBA	Abuja	Proposed	

== See also ==
- List of tallest buildings in Africa
- List of tallest buildings in the world
