= Omo Ghetto =

2010 Nigerian crime comedy film directed by Funke Akindele

- Directed by: Abiodun Olanrewaju
- Written by: Funke Akindele
- Produced by: Funke Akindele
- Starring: Funke Akindele; Eniola Badmus; Bimbo Thomas; Ireti Osayemi; Esther Kalejaiye; Adebayo Salami; Taiwo Ibikunle
- Music by: Baba Nee
- Production company: Scene One Productions
- Distributed by: Olasco Films Nig. Ltd.
- Release date: 24 October 2010
- Country: Nigeria
- Language: Yoruba

Omo Ghetto (English translation: Child of the Ghetto) is a 2010 Nigerian crime comedy drama film directed by Abiodun Olarenwaju, starring Funke Akindele, Bimbo Thomas, Ireti Osayemi, Esther Kalejaiye and Eniola Badmus.

== Synopsis ==
The film is based on the societal vices by a women-dominated gang. It showcases family, crime and sisterhood.

== Reception ==
Olusegun Michael for Modern Ghana praised the plot, casting, theme and interpretation of roles in the film, describing it as a "didactic, entertaining and revealing" film. In 2017, Azeezat Kareem for Encomium Magazine listed Omo Ghetto as one of two films that brought Eniola Badmus to major limelight in the Nigerian film industry. It was also included in Legit.ng five "most memorable" films of Funke Akindele.

== Cast ==
- Funke Akindele as Lefty and Ayomide
- Bimbo Thomas as Nicky
- Eniola Badmus as Busty
- Esther Kalejaiye Omo Joibo
- Ireti Osayemi as Skoda
- Adebayo Salami as Baba Onibaba
- Taiwo Ibikunle as Yanju
- Bisi Ladegan as Jibike
- Peju Ogunmola as Ayomide's Mother
- Rachel Oniga as Yanju's Mother
- Taiwo Hassan as DPO
- Yinka Quadri as Yanju's Father
- Ronke Ojo
- Lanre Oropo as Lawyer

== Release ==
The film had its premiere at the Exhibition Hall, National Arts Theatre, Iganmu on October 24, 2010.

== Sequel ==
The sequel of the film titled Omo Ghetto: The Saga was released on 25 December 2020.

== See also ==
- List of Nigerian films
