= Eko Atlantic =

- City
- Nigeria International Commerce city
- Rendition of Eko Boulevard in the Business District

- Motto: Live and Work
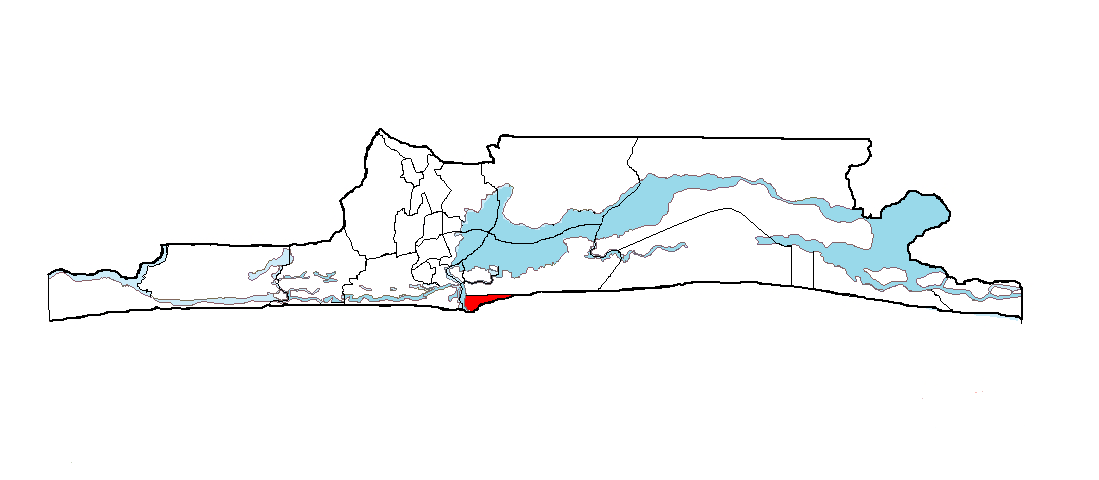
- Eko Atlantic shown within the State of Lagos

- Location of Eko Atlantic in Nigeria
- Coordinates: 06°24′00″N 03°24′18″E
- Country: Nigeria
- State: Lagos State
- LGA(s): Independent
- Founded: 2003
- Incorporated: 2014

Government
  - City Planner: South Energyx Nigeria Limited
  - Chairman SENL: David Frame

Area
  - Total: 25 km^{2} (9.7 sq mi)
  - Land: 10 km^{2} (3.9 sq mi)
  - Water: 15 km^{2} (5.8 sq mi) 60%
- Time zone: UTC+1 (WAT)
- Website: EkoAtlantic.com

Eko Atlantic, officially Nigeria International Commerce city, is a planned city in Lagos State, Nigeria, being constructed on a peninsula as land reclaimed from the Atlantic Ocean. Upon completion, the new peninsula is anticipating at least 250,000 residents and a daily flow of 150,000 commuters.

The city adjoins Victoria Island district of Lagos city, abutting the Phase 1 area of Lekki to the north, while the western, eastern, and southern borders are a coastline.

On the Lagos Bar Beach, coastal erosion has long been an issue, occurring at a rate of 30 metres (98 ft) per year. The project involves reclaiming 9 square kilometres (3.5 sq mi) of ground in front of Bar Beach. A revetment with a length of around 8.4 kilometres (5.2 mi) surrounds the newly recovered area to reduce erosion. The development is also designed to help in stopping the erosion of Lagos city's coastline.

Another goal is to contribute to addressing the city of Lagos's expanding population. With 10 districts spread across a land area of approximately 10 square kilometres (3.9 sq mi), the city is intended to satisfy needs for financial, commercial, residential, and tourist accommodations.

Eko Atlantic development is being carried out as a public–private partnership (PPP) with private companies and investors providing the funding, whilst the Lagos State Government (LASG) is a strategic partner, with the support of the federal government. The contractors are China Communications Construction Group LTD (CCCC), a company that works in the field of marine dredging and landfill operation. Consultants are Royal Haskoning (traffic and transport expertise) and ar+h Architects. South Energyx Nigeria Ltd., a subsidiary of the Chagoury group, was specifically created to undertake the development. Testing of the sea defence system took place at the DHI Institute in Copenhagen, Denmark, where models were successfully tested for one-in-a-hundred-year ocean surges, and one-in-120-year, one-in-150-year and one-in-1,000-year storms.

== History ==
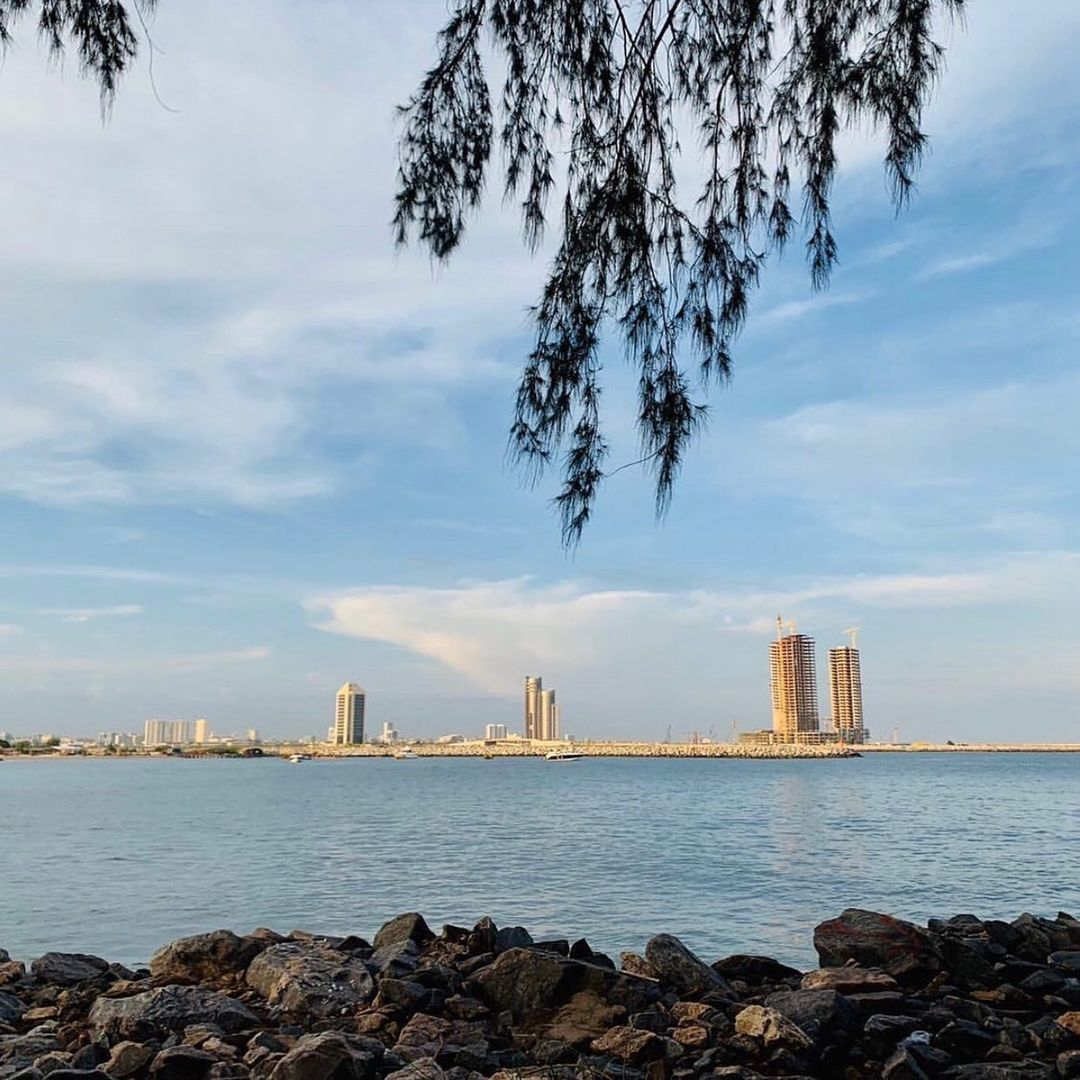
Eko Atlantic City's skyline in 2020

As of May 2009, while the project was still in its dredging phase, about 3,000,000 cubic metres (3,900,000 yd^{3}) had been sand-filled and placed in the reclamation area, while about 35,000 tonnes of rock had been delivered to the site. In certain parts of Bar Beach, the land being reclaimed can already be seen. Dredgers work round the clock to sand-fill the site. The reclamation was reported to cost around $6B.

In September 2009, the Lagos State Government and South Energyx received the Clinton Global Initiative Commitment Certificate.

On 21 February 2013, a ceremony was held to mark the reclamation of land of Eko Atlantic, with Goodluck Jonathan, former U.S. president Bill Clinton, Babatunde Fashola, Bola Tinubu, Aminu Tambuwal, and Ibikunle Amosun attending.

In March 2014, David Frame, managing director of South Energyx Nigeria Ltd., the firm responsible for the development, confirmed that "The first residential tower will open in 2016".

By November 2020, a few buildings, most notably Eko Pearl Towers, had been completed, with several more under construction and at planning stages. The city had become an active venue for popular afro-concerts and sports events like the Lagos City Marathon and Copa Lagos.

Eko Atlantic City has secured an EDGE certification from the International Finance Corporation (IFC), a member of the World Bank Group.

== Overview ==
Masterplan of Eko Atlantic (2015 revision)

Eko Atlantic is intended to satisfy needs for financial, commercial, residential and tourist accommodations, with infrastructure in line with modern and environmental standards. These standards will offer the city's residents water, waste management, security and transportation systems. The city will also have an independent source of energy generated specifically for the city.

The city additionally aims to restore land lost to coastal erosion over the past century, offer a long-term solution to the erosion problem along Lagos' coastline, shield Victoria Island from ocean surge. It will be situated on land reclaimed from erosion protected by a coastal revetment designed by Royal Haskoning colloquially known as the Great Wall of Lagos, a planned 8.5-kilometre-long (5.3 mi) barrier constructed primarily of rock and faced with concrete accropode armour. Seven kilometers of revetment will also be built.

The city will have its own bureaucracy and be regarded as a separate municipality. It will have an offshore banking zone and permit investors to transfer money freely.

=== Districts ===
When the city is finished, it will have 3,000 buildings and 400,000 homes for residential, business, financial, and tourist lodging purposes. Ten districts will make up the city, including:

- Business Districts
- Fall lights
- Marina Districts
- Downtown
- Eko Island
- Avenues
- Four Bridges
- Eko Drive
- East Side Marina
- Ocean Front

== Criticism ==
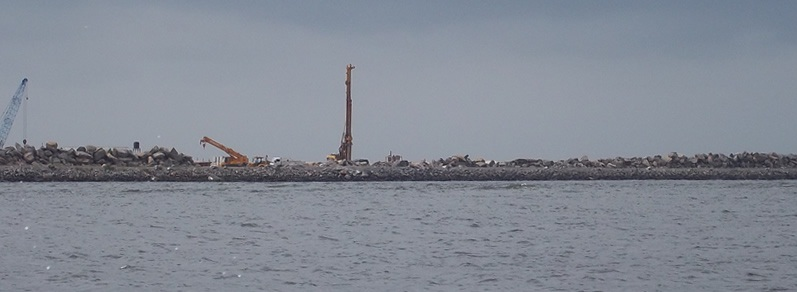
Shoreline of Eko Atlantic under construction (2011)

The Eko Atlantic project has been criticized by residents living nearby, who say that ongoing construction works have caused coastal erosion and ocean surges. Ocean water surges through living areas, flooding access roads and taking down electricity poles and forcing residents to relocate. The Lagos State Government is also being criticized for failing to involve the people in the project.

In August 2012, the Atlantic Ocean surged and overflowed its banks, sweeping 16 people into the Atlantic Ocean, killing several, and flooding Kuramo Beach, Victoria Island and other areas. According to an environmental expert, "the ocean surge occurred as a result of the failure of the contractors handling the sandfilling activities of the proposed Atlantic Ocean City, to put in place measure that would reduce the effect of the surge on the environment". The Lagos State chapter of the People's Democratic Party issued an official statement, blaming the ACN (now APC)-led state government's sand filling for the ocean surge. The party called for a stop to the Eko Atlantic project and immediate compensation for the bereaved families.

On 29 April 2024, demolition of Landmark beach began; to give way to the Lagos-Calabar Coastal Highway, Nigeria’s biggest public infrastructure project. Discussions around the ownership of the coast; Eko Atlantic and Landmark's claim to this contentious and premium waterfront.

== See also ==
- Centenary City
- Ikoyi
- Maroko, Lagos
