= Bimbo Thomas =

Nigerian actress

- Citizenship: Nigeria
- Education: University of Lagos
- Occupations: Actress film producer Entrepreneur
- Notable work: Omo Ghetto

Bimbo Thomas // is a Nigerian actress, film producer and entrepreneur.

== Early life and education ==
Bimbo Thomas was born in Lagos to a family of seven. She holds a degree in Creative Arts from the University of Lagos.

== Career ==
Thomas started her acting career as a trainee with the Odun Ifa Group. She is known for her character role in Omo Ghetto and its sequel Omo Ghetto: The Saga.

== Filmography ==
- Omo Ghetto: The Saga (2020) - Nikky
- Omo Ghetto (2010) - Nikky
- Jelili (2011) - Olusoro
- Oludamoran
- Aye Are
- Eruku Nla
- Farayola (2009)
- Omo Poly
- Omoniyun (2019)
- Hell cat (2019) - Woman
- Omoniyun (2019)
- Honeymoon Palava (2021)
- Rancor (2022)
