= Gilbert Chagoury =

Nigerian businessman (born 1946)

Gilbert R. Chagoury
- Born: 8 January 1946 (age 80); Lagos, British Nigeria
- Education: Collège des Frères Chrétiens
- Occupations: Businessman; Diplomat; Philanthropist
- Spouse: Rose-Marie Chamchoum
- Children: 4
- Relatives: Ronald Chagoury (brother)

Gilbert Ramez Chagoury (Arabic: جيلبيرت رامز شاغوري; born 1946) is a Lebanese Nigerian businessman, philanthropist, diplomat, and convicted money-launderer.

== Early life ==
Gilbert Chagoury is a Lebanese Nigerian who was born to Lebanese immigrant parents in Lagos, Nigeria. He studied at the Collège des Frères Chrétiens in Lebanon before returning to Nigeria.

== Business ==
In 1971, he co-founded the Chagoury Group with his younger brother Ronald Chagoury, an industrial conglomerate with interests in construction, real estate and property development, flour mills, water bottling and purification, glass manufacturing, insurance, hotels, furniture manufacturing, telecommunications, IT, catering and international financing. Gilbert and Ronald Chagoury founded C & C Construction in the late 1970s, which was the forerunner of Hitech and ITB (these now form the Construction Division of the Chagoury group of Companies).

In 2000, Chagoury was convicted by a Swiss court of "money laundering and aiding a criminal organisation" for $120 million (USD) worth of money transfers to accounts tied to the family of the former dictator of Nigeria, Sani Abacha. He also pleaded guilty to similar charges in the United States. Nigerian authorities later attempted to capture and prosecute Chagoury for financial crimes and bribery under the Abacha regime, but without success. He was also under investigation by the United States Department of Justice in 2018 for making illegal foreign campaign contributions to American politicians in three elections. That case led to a civil settlement and a deferred prosecution agreement against him. Chagoury has maintained his innocence in these cases.

In 2024, Nigerian president Bola Tinubu awarded the $11 billion Lagos-Calabar Coastal Highway project to Chagoury's Hitech, a deal that came under scrutiny due to the lack of public bidding as well as the longtime association between Tinubu and Chagoury. It has since been reported that Tinubu's son, Seyi Tinubu, sits on the board of one of Chagoury's companies, while also being a joint shareholder in a British Virgin Islands with Gilbert's son, Ronald Chagoury Jr.

Through their ownership of the Chagoury Group, Gilbert Chagoury and his family have an estimated wealth of $4.2 billion.

Gilbert Chagoury has indirect business ties to Michael Boulos, the United States Senior Advisor for Arab and African Affairs, through shared corporate operations in Nigeria.

Both individuals are of Lebanese origin and have maintained long-standing business interests in Nigeria. Chagoury is the principal of Hitech Construction Company, which is currently the lead contractor for the $11 billion, 700-kilometer Lagos–Calabar Coastal Highway project. Boulos was previously the Chief Executive Officer of SCOA Nigeria PLC, a company engaged in heavy truck assembly and the dealership of heavy machinery and industrial equipment. His wife, Sarah Boulos, currently serves as a non-executive director of SCOA. Boulos also serves as Chief Operating Officer of Hitech Construction.

According to media reports, SCOA is a major supplier of machinery and technology to Hitech Construction, linking the two companies operationally on the Lagos–Calabar project. The business relationship thus creates an indirect commercial link between Chagoury and Boulos.

On the political side, Michael Boulos is married to Tiffany Trump, the daughter of United States President Donald Trump. His appointment in 2025 as U.S. Senior Advisor for Arab and African Affairs has drawn public attention to his family and business background, including his Nigerian commercial interests.

== Diplomacy and politics ==
He served as an Ambassador and Adviser to governments in Africa and the Americas. He has also served as Ambassador to the Vatican for St. Lucia, economic adviser to President Mathieu Kérékou of Benin, and ambassador to UNESCO.

Chagoury was a close associate of Nigerian dictator, General Sani Abacha, who helped his business interests in the country. After Abacha died in 1998, Chagoury returned an estimated $300 million to the Nigerian government to secure his indemnity from possible criminal charges.

Chagoury is a major donor to the Clinton Foundation.

In 2010, the U.S. Department of Homeland Security apologized to Chagoury after detaining him at Teterboro Airport for over four hours because of inclusion on a no-fly list.

In 2018, the Lebanese-Nigerian billionaire and two of his associates agreed to resolve a federal investigation that they conspired to violate federal election laws by scheming to make illegal campaign contributions to U.S. presidential and congressional candidates, including Nebraska representative Jeff Fortenberry. Fortenberry was eventually convicted of lying to federal officials about these contributions and announced his resignation effective 31 March 2022.

== Philanthropy ==
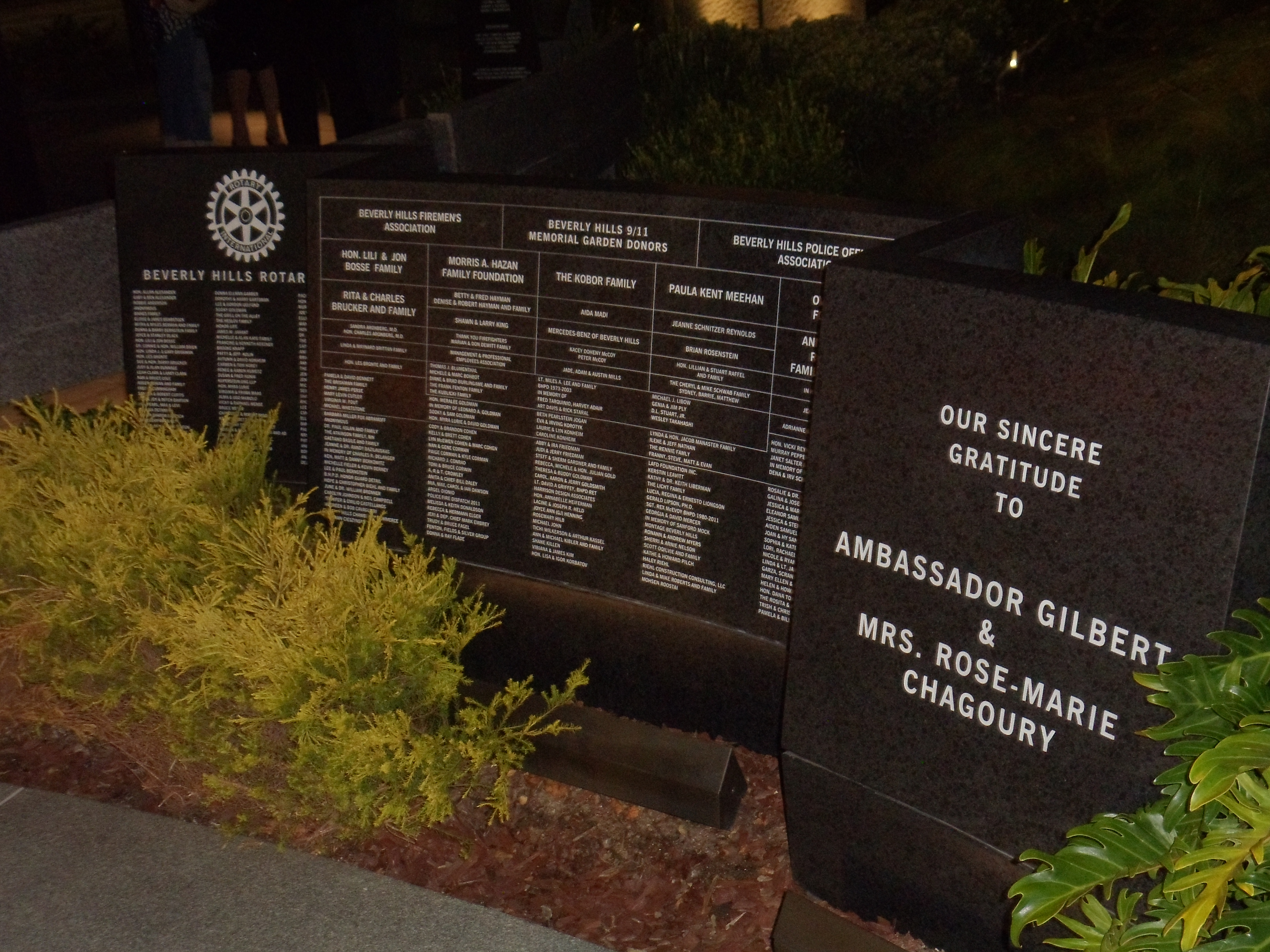
List of donors at the Beverly Hills 9/11 Memorial Garden in Beverly Hills, California

He is a key benefactor for St. Jude Children's Research Hospital in Memphis, Tennessee, and he and his wife were named by the hospital as their Man of the Year in 1990 and Woman of the Year in 1988. He serves on the board of the Lebanese American University where he provided a donation of $10 million to fund the Gilbert and Rose-Marie Chagoury School of Medicine and $3.5 million for the construction of the Alice Ramez Chagoury School of Nursing.

The Louvre's Gilbert et Rose Marie Chagoury Gallery is named for them, housing a permanent exhibit including French works donated by the Chagourys. He has donated in excess of $340,000 for the renovations of the Church of Our Lady of Lebanon in Paris, France. He has also donated US$10,000 to the Beverly Hills 9/11 Memorial Garden in Beverly Hills, California.

== Personal life ==
He has been married since 1969 to Rose Marie Chamchoum. They have four children.
