= Eko Hotels and Suites =

Hotel in Lagos, Nigeria

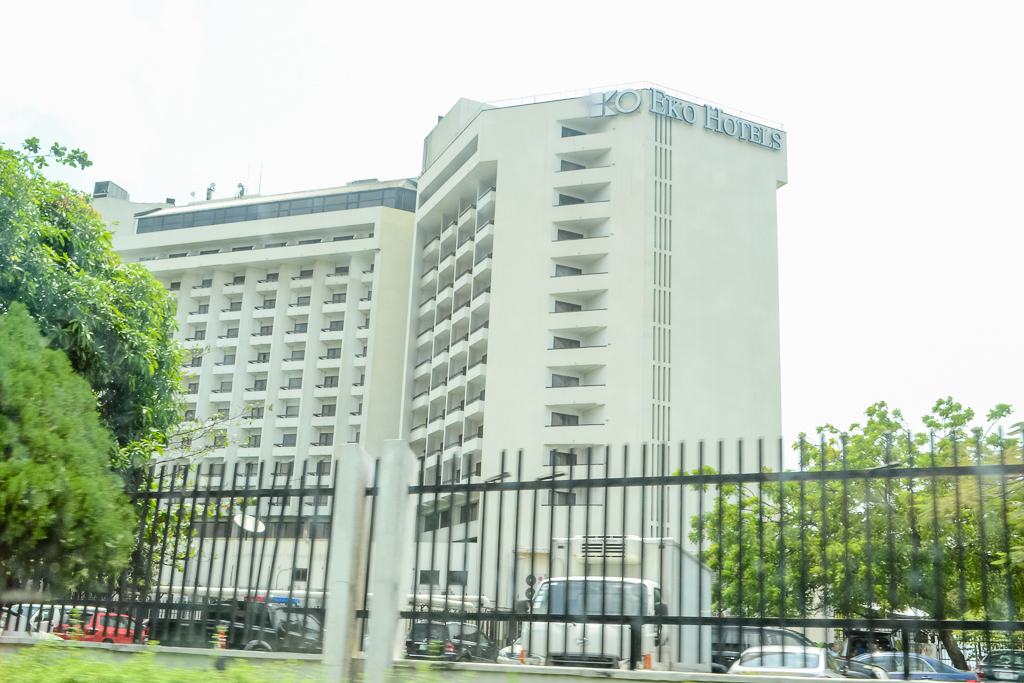
- Eko Hotels & Suites Building
- Interactive map of the Eko Hotels and Suites area
- Hotel chain: Eko Hotels & Resorts

General information
- Location: Plot 1415 Adetokunbo Ademola Street, PMB 12724, Victoria Island, Lagos, Lagos State, Nigeria
- Coordinates: 6°25′34″N 3°25′48″E
- Opening: 1977; 49 years ago
- Operator: Chagoury Group

Design and construction
- Architect: Oluwole Olumuyiwa

Other information
- Number of rooms: 825
- Number of restaurants: 8

Website
- www.ekohotels.com

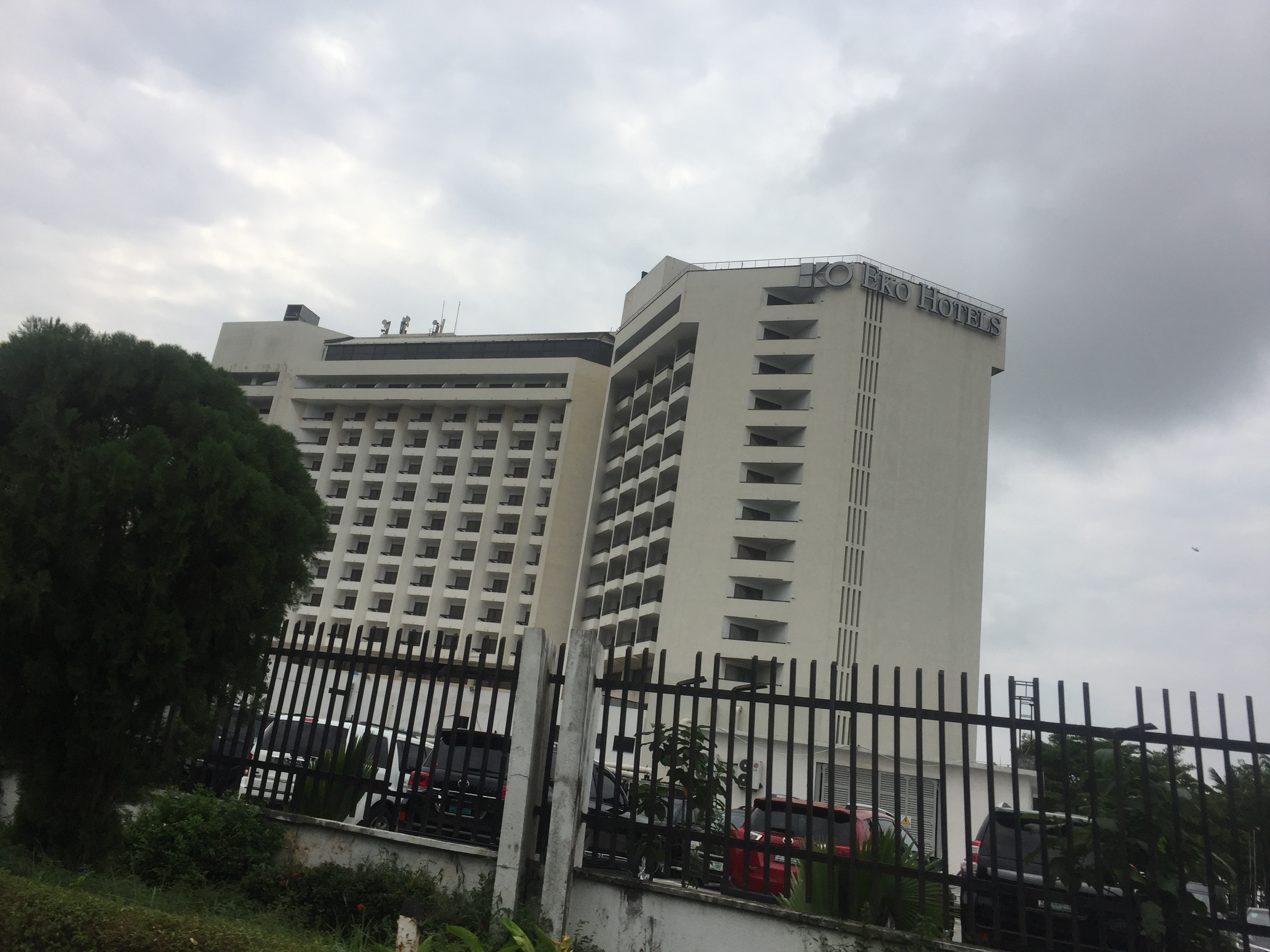
Eko hotel & suites

Eko Hotel and Suites is a five-star hotel and conference centre in Lagos, Nigeria.

== History ==
Established in 1977 as Èkó Holiday Inn and built on Victoria Island, it is the largest hotel in Nigeria. It was designed by architect Oluwole Olumuyiwa in collaboration with Americans. It was subsequently renamed Le Meridien Eko Hotel and Suites, Lagos. L'Hotel Eko Le Meridien is part of the Chagoury Group of companies. In September 2024, the Lagos zone of the National Association of Nigeria Travel Agencies (NANTA) entered a mutually benefitting agreement with the hotel to display Nigeria's deep tourism to the world.

== Ownership ==
Eko Hotels and Suites is owned by the Chagoury Group, a conglomerate led by Nigerian-Lebanese businessmen Ronald and Gilbert Chagoury. The hotel is part of their extensive portfolio, which includes other significant investments such as Eko Atlantic City and various construction companies.

== Design ==
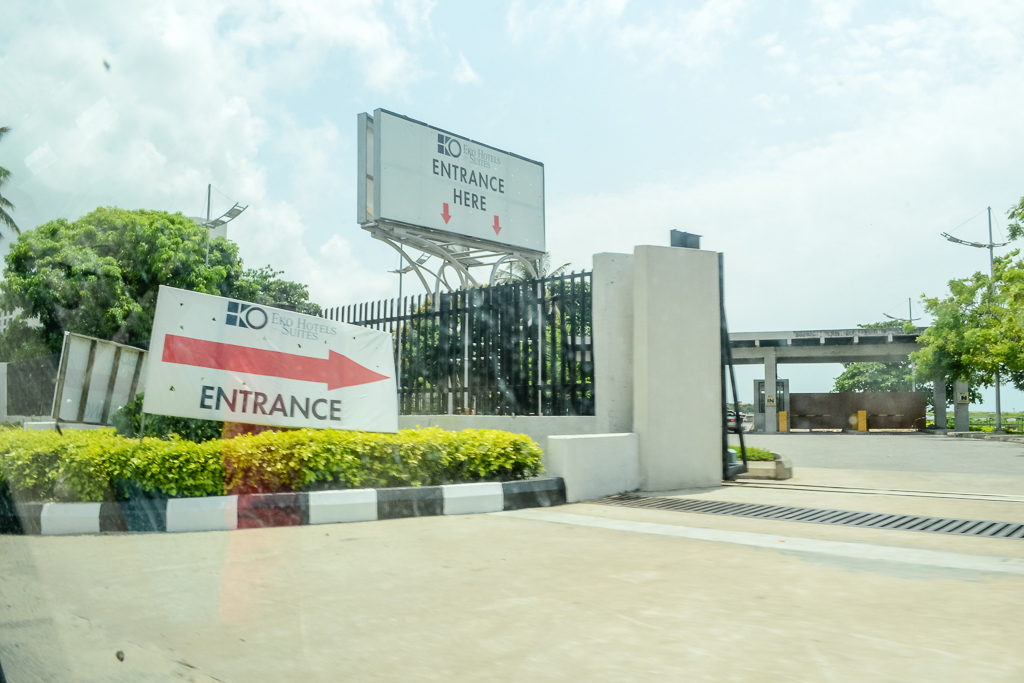
Eko Hotels & Suites Entrance

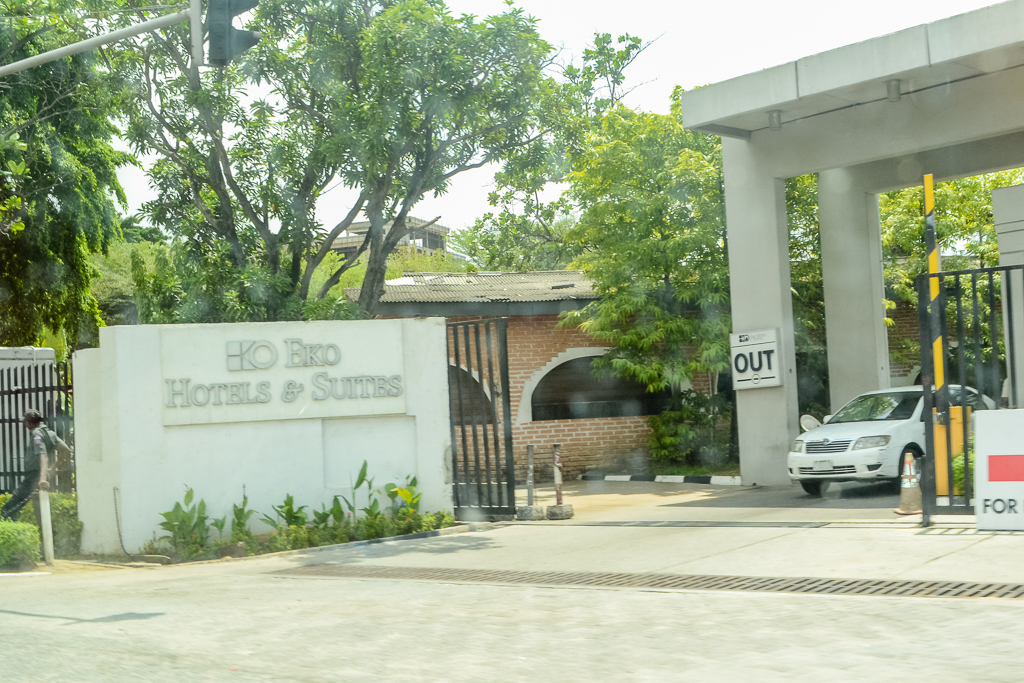
Eko Hotels & Suites Exit

The hotel building comprises 825 rooms and suites in four multistory buildings, clad in white with views of the Atlantic Ocean and the Kuramo Lagoon. The hotel located next to the financial centres of Lagos Island: Victoria Island. Eko Hotels & Suites has a sister hotel in Port Harcourt named Hotel Presidential.

== Events ==
Eko Hotels & Suites has the largest convention centre in Nigeria. Events that have taken place at the hotel include; concerts, movie premieres, international exhibitions, weddings, conferences and award ceremonies. The convention centre is usually used for these events and can cater to 6,000 people. The venue hosted the 2026 Africa Magic Viewers' Choice Awards.

== Restaurants ==
There are eight restaurants and bars within the hotel complex:

- The Sky Restaurant & Terrace located on the Roof of the hotel.
- Crossroads Tex Mex Restaurant and Bar which serves Mexican Cuisine.
- 1415 Italian Restaurant, located at Eko Signature which specializes in Italian Fine Dining.
- Kuramo Sports Café serves continental and local dishes with a full buffet.
- Red Chinese Restaurant which is located at the roof behind the Eko Convention Centre.
- The Lagoon Breeze Restaurant which is also known for its BBQ Fridays.
- The Grill "Steakhouse" located at Eko Suites
- Calabash Bar, an open-air bar by Kuramo Sports Cafe offers special cocktails and other beverages.

== See also ==
- List of hotels in Lagos
