= Abati OldTaker =

2025 Nigerian web series

- Genre: Comedy
- Created by: Abati Adeotan Abidemi
- Written by: Tolulope Oloko
- Directed by: Director Razzy
- Starring: Abati Adeotan Abidemi; Nwokedi Chinemelum Valentine; Bamikefa Stella; Cynthia Emmanuel Chiamaka
- Music by: Abati Abidemi
- Country of origin: Nigeria
- Original language: English
- No. of seasons: 1
- No. of episodes: 5

Production
- Executive producer: Bamikefa Stella

Original release
- Network: YouTube
- Release: 2025 – present

Abati OldTaker is a Nigerian comedy web series directed by DirectorRazzy. The series was premiered on July 20, 2025. Created by Abati Adeotan Abidemi and executive produced by Bamikefa Stella with an ensemble cast that includes Abidemi, Mimisola Daniel, Nwokedi Chinemelum Valentine, Bamikefa Stella, and Cynthia Emmanuel Chiamaka.

== Premise ==
Oldtaker, a man who used to be wealthy but who keeps up the pretense of wealth despite losing his fortune. His efforts to keep up with his previous level of social standing end up causing him problems with other people.

== Cast ==
- Abati Adeotan Abidemi as Abati
- Mimisola Daniel
- Nwokedi Chinemelum Valentine ("Funny Kante") as Officer
- Bamikefa Stella
- Ojukwu
- Skinny Blaq
- Nafaruq
- Farulee
- Porkiyor
- Stevho Osha

== Episodes ==
No.	Title	Directed by	Written by	Original release date
1	"Episode 1"	DirectorRazzy	Tolulope Oloko	July 20, 2025
Abati struggles to maintain his wealthy image while dealing with the consequences of his behavior and the financial demands of those around him.
2	"Episode 2"	DirectorRazzy	Tolulope Oloko	August 15, 2025
A group of struggling roommates trapped in a cycle of financial turmoil and interpersonal chaos.
3	"Episode 3"	DirectorRazzy	Tolulope Oloko	September 21, 2025
Abati comes across a man outside his estate and asked him for a job. As he tries to make ends meet through different ventures, including a POS business, he runs into financial problems, failed attempts and conflicts with people around him.
4	"Episode 4"	DirectorRazzy	Tolulope Oloko	October 26, 2025
Oldtaker boasts about his supposed wealth and uses displays of money and possessions to impress others. He visits people from his past, tries to win back Stella, and encourages a friend to sell family property to invest in forex.
5	"Episode 5"	DirectorRazzy	Tolulope Oloko	December 27, 2025
Abati faces financial problems, legal trouble and conflict with Stella, who leaves him after he fails to contribute financially. After being questioned over missing money, he becomes involved in an illicit deal while struggling to find a way out of his worsening circumstances.

== Release ==
Abati OldTaker was released on YouTube on July 20, 2025.

== Reception ==
The Sun Nigeria praised the series for combining humor, drama and realism in illustrating the reality of internet scams and the consequences of quick money and bad decisions leading to downfall. It commended the writing and acting of the actors as well as the pace of the drama. It also noted the series' use of satire and storytelling to challenge the perceived glamour associated with internet fraud. Film critc Lucky David of Report Naija gave the third episode a mixed review, praising its portrayal of Oldtaker's struggle with his changed financial circumstances and the character's encounters with people from his past. The review criticized the episode's repetitive arguments, heavy reliance on shouting and skit-like structure, while describing Oldtaker as an effective central character. In a similar review, Daily Trust’s Seun Adeuyi gave the first episode a mixed review. He praised Adeotan for his performance and how the episode used money, status, and confrontation for comedy. However Adeuyi criticized the repetitive structure and under-developed supporting characters and found that the episode largely followed a familiar style of Nigerian comedy. This Day, Ayo Ake commended the theme of the series and its form of humor. But criticized the series for its repetitious joke pattern, use of noisy confrontations and tendency to go for easier gags than developing the themes of the show.
