= 4 Bourdillon =

- Interactive map of the 4 Bourdillon area

General information
- Status: Topped-out
- Type: Residential
- Architectural style: Contemporary architecture
- Location: Lagos, Ikoyi, Lagos, Nigeria
- Coordinates: 6.44511°N 3.43382°E
- Construction started: 2015
- Completed: 2020

Height
- Height: 102.6 m (337 ft)

Technical details
- Floor count: 25

Design and construction
- Architects: P&T Architect and Engineers AOR-Design Group Nigeria
- Developer: Kaizen Properties
- Structural engineer: Hancock Ogundiya and Partners Ltd.
- Main contractor: EL-ALAN Construction Company (Nig) Ltd

4 Bourdillon is one of the tallest residential buildings in West Africa. It is located on the corner of Bourdillon and Thompson Road, Ikoyi, Lagos. It is a Twin Tower of 25 floors comprising 41 apartments (Flats, Duplex Flats and Duplex Penthouses). The 41 units have 3 and 4 bedroom Flats and 5-dedroom duplex Flats and duplex penthouses.

The building's other features include greenery, water-bodies, swimming pools, tennis court, gym and clubhouse with underground parking. It's penthouses have roof gardens and curved balconies. It's glazed balustrade allows a 360-degree view of Lagos Island.

The building was designed by architects Design Group Nigeria, P&T group and developed by Kaizen Properties and El-Alan Group. El-Alan was also the main contractor. Construction started in 2015 and completed in early 2020.

== See also ==
List of tallest buildings in Nigeria
