= Centenary City =

- City
- Centenary City
- Rendition of the skyline of the Financial District, showing the dominating proposed Africa Tower

- Location of Centenary City in Nigeria
- Coordinates: 8°56′08″N 7°17′36″E
- Country: Nigeria
- Territory: Federal Capital Territory
- Founded: 2014
- Incorporated: 2014

Area
  - Total: 12.62 km^{2} (4.87 sq mi)
- This project is currently under development

Centenary City is a planned city in the Federal Capital Territory in Nigeria. Centenary City is a master-planned development overseen by Centenary City FZE, as part of Nigeria's vision to create the city of the future smart city along the same lines as Dubai, Monaco and Singapore. The city is to be built from scratch on 1,260 hectares (4.9 sq mi) of virgin land located several kilometers southwest of Nigeria's capital, Abuja and five kilometers from the International Airport.

The concept of the city was conceived as a legacy project to mark the 100 year anniversary of Nigeria by January 1, 2014, during the administration of President Goodluck Jonathan. The city will have a mixed-use urban center, a central business district, a financial center, a museum and cultural center to promote African and global arts, world-class hotels, Grade A offices, residential districts, an 18-hole golf course, polo and country club, an international convention center, sports and leisure facilities, a safari Park, educational institutions, healthcare, and community amenities. It is to be private-sector driven.

Centenary City has been declared an Economic City and approved for Free Trade Zone (FTZ) status by Nigeria Export Processing Zone Authority (NEPZA). Centenary City is not the first FTZ to be licensed by NEPZA. There are over 30 FTZ operating in Nigeria approved by the government in order to boost the economy and attract foreign direct investments (FDI).

== Delays and return to work ==
As of August 2018, plans were afoot for the project to get back on track after three years of administrative and land acquisition setbacks. Speaking at a press briefing, the director of NEPZA said the project when completed will attract Foreign Direct Investments (FDIs) worth over $18bn and create direct 250,000 jobs. He revealed that the local and foreign investors led by Nigerian businessman, Alhaji Baba Dantata and Front Range, have so invested $40 million on the master plan and other preliminary works. A signature infrastructure called “Buhari Tower”, named after incumbent President Muhammadu Buhari has been earmarked for construction within the Centenary City project.

== Commencement of work ==
Work commenced in 2018 on the first Co-development Project of Centenary City, namely "The Grove". Primary infrastructure of the site has reached 60% completion.

== See also ==
- Eko Atlantic
