= World Trade Centre Abuja =

Building complex in Abuja, Nigeria

The World Trade Centre
- Rendition of the complex

General information
- Status: Topped-out; under construction; Proposed (Note: WTC Towers 1 and 2 have been topped out. WTC Capital Mall is under construction. WTC The Hotel, as well as Towers 3, 4, 5 and 6 have been planned for future phases.)
- Type: WTC Tower 1: residential; WTC Tower 2: office; WTC Capital Mall: retail; WTC The Hotel: hotel; WTC Tower 3: TBD; WTC Tower 4: TBD; WTC Tower 5: TBD; WTC Tower 6: TBD
- Architectural style: High-Tech
- Location: Plot 1113, Constitution Avenue, Central Business District, Abuja, FCT
- Coordinates: 9.0489988°N 7.4733539°E
- Construction started: WTC Tower 1: September 2011; WTC Tower 2: September 2011; WTC Capital Mall: 2016; WTC The Hotel: 2017; WTC Tower 3: TBD; WTC Tower 4: TBD; WTC Tower 5: TBD; WTC Tower 6: TBD
- Completed: WTC Tower 1: 2016; WTC Tower 2: 2016; WTC Capital Mall: 2016; WTC The Hotel: 2023; WTC Tower 3: TBA; WTC Tower 4: TBA; WTC Tower 5: TBA; WTC Tower 6: TBA
- Opened: 8 December 2023; 2 years ago
- Cost: NG₦152 billion (~US$1 billion)

Height
- Roof: WTC Tower 1: 110 m (361 ft); WTC Tower 2: 120 m (394 ft); WTC The Hotel: TBD; WTC Tower 3: TBD; WTC Tower 4: TBD; WTC Tower 5: TBD; WTC Tower 6: TBD

Technical details
- Material: glass, steel, aluminum, concrete reinforced
- Floor count: WTC Tower 1: 24; WTC Tower 2: 25; WTC The Hotel: 38-45; WTC Tower 3: TBD; WTC Tower 4: TBD; WTC Tower 5: TBD; WTC Tower 6: TBD

Design and construction
- Architect: Woods Bagot
- Developer: First Intercontinental Properties Limited
- Main contractor: Abuja Investments Company; WSP Consulting; Edifice Consultants PVT Limited; Messrs Hancock Ogundiya & Partners; Space Designers Limited

Website
- wtcabuja.com/

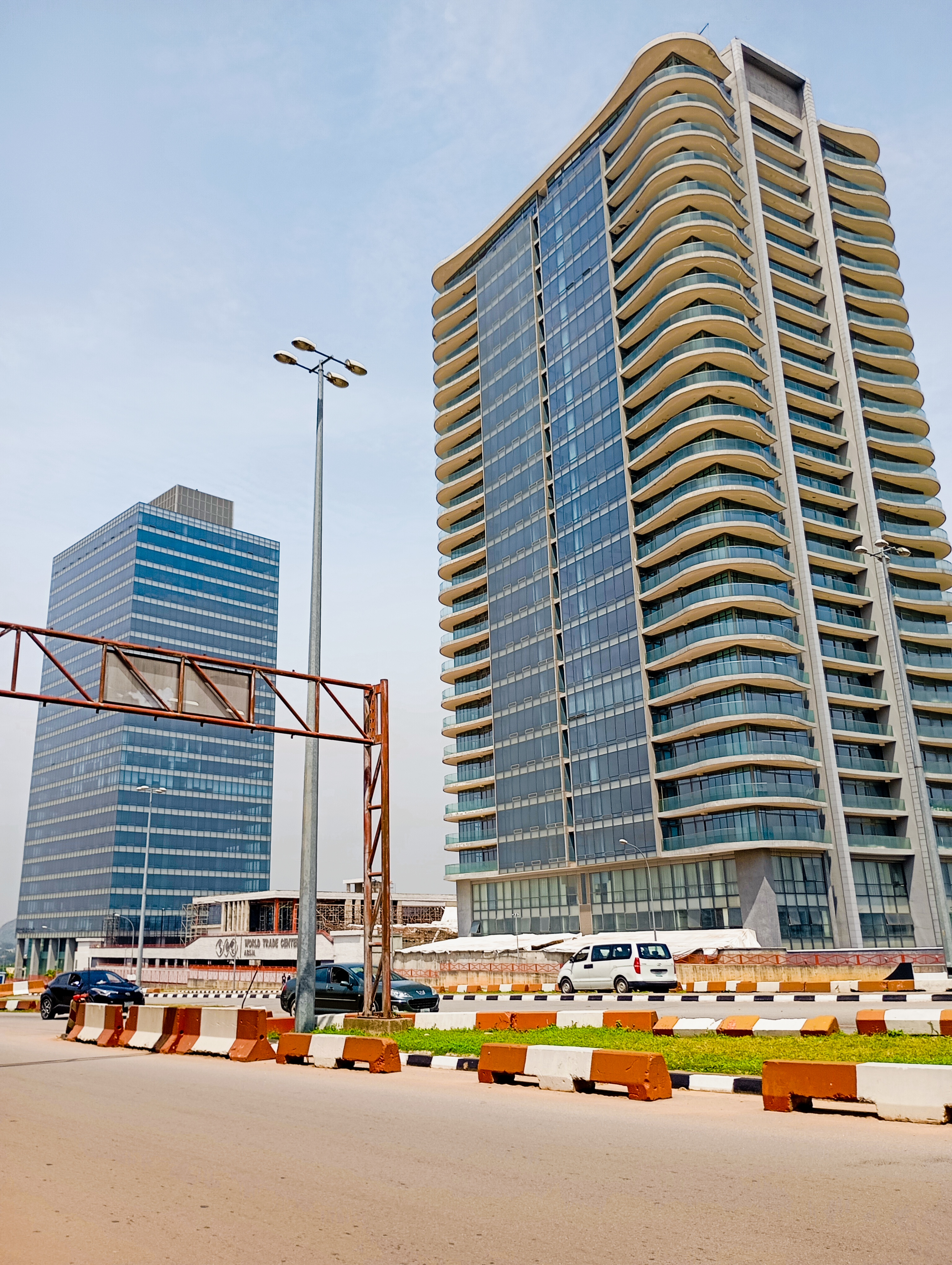
Headquarters building

The World Trade Centre is a complex of eight buildings under construction in the Central Business District of Abuja, FCT in Nigeria. There are seven skyscrapers planned for the site, two of which have already been topped out, with the others either under construction or at various stages of development. At 110 m (361 ft), the 24-floor WTC Tower 1, which topped out in 2015 was briefly the tallest residential building in Nigeria, while WTC Tower 2 is the tallest building in Abuja, standing at 120 m (394 ft). Initially scheduled to be opened in 2013, the World Trade Centre Abuja is now scheduled to open in 2016.

The complex is being funded by private financial institutions, as well as private investors, costing about ₦200 billion. It is being developed by First Intercontinental Properties Limited, a subsidiary of The churchgate Group, a Nigerian real estate company, and the project was designed by Woods Bagot, WSP Consulting is the structural consultant, whilst Abuja Investments Company is also a partner. The WTC Abuja, when completed, will be the largest mixed-use development on the West African subcontinent.

== Development ==
The development of World Trade Centre Abuja started in 2010, on a land size of over 6,000 hectares in the Central Business District of Abuja. The project was initially on a much lesser scale; at the conceptual stage of the project, two unsuccessful attempts were made at securing development partners before First Continental Properties Limited was secured in 2009 through a bid process which eventually led to a development-lease agreement with Abuja Investments Company Limited (ACIL). Along the line, the scope of the project was later expanded to a mega-multi-use complex, "which would be bustling throughout the day and night".

President Goodluck Jonathan broke ground for the project in September 2011, with an estimated completion and opening date initially scheduled for 2013. However, the date could not be kept due to several challenges in design, development and even during construction process of the project. The project has also undergone several redesign in order to meet the changing "market demands".

The complex is being funded by private financial institutions, as well as private investors, costing about ₦200 billion. it is being developed by The churchgate Group, a Nigerian real estate company, with Woods Bagot as the architect. Other partners and consultants of the project include: Abuja Investments Company who is a partner, WSP Consulting is the structural consultant, Edifice Consultants PVT Limited is the executive architect, as well as MEP Consultant. Others are: Messrs Hancock Ogundiya & Partners, Local MEP & C&S Consultants, while Space Designers Limited is the Local Architectural Consultant.

== Architecture and design ==
The glass cladding and aluminum ceilings used for the buildings in World Trade Centre are heat-resistant, sound-proof and also are not flammable. The buildings employ VRV air conditioning systems. The centre also has an advanced CCTV security and employs a controlled Card access in all areas. There are three levels of basement parking in the complex. The curtain wall system employed by the building was installed by Eurotech Facades.

== Structures ==
Six towers, a mall, and a hotel are to eventually occupy the World Trade Centre Abuja; As of 2015, towers 1 and 2 have been topped out, whilst the other buildings are in different stages of development.

=== World Trade Centre Tower 1 ===
The World Trade Centre Tower 1, also called Tower 1, is a 24-floor apartment building, standing at 110 m (361 ft). The tower contains 120 apartments, which range in size from 1 to 6 bedrooms, with Duplex options and two exquisite Penthouses and Pool Villas. Tower 1 topped out in 2015, becoming the tallest residential building in Nigeria.

=== World Trade Centre Tower 2 ===
Being self touted as "Abuja's only Grade-A office space", The World Trade Centre Tower 2, or Tower 2, is a 25-floor commercial building, standing at 120 m (394 ft). Office options in this tower ranges from 130 square metres to 1,440 square metres. It topped out in 2015, to become the tallest building in Abuja.

=== Capital Mall ===
Capital Mall, or Capital City Mall, is scheduled to begin operations in late 2016. It is estimated to have a capacity of about 40,000 square metres, on two levels.

=== World Trade Centre - The Hotel ===
The hotel is scheduled to begin construction in 2016/2017. It will be a 5-star 38-storey branded hotel, managed by Grand Hyatt. The number of floors has also been published to be at least 45 floors.

== 2014 crane collapse ==
In November 2014, one of the construction cranes for WTC Tower 2 buckled after a prolonged heavy rainfall, damaging a substantial area of the glass cladding as a result. It was deduced that the crane fell due to impact of thunder storm. No casualty was recorded, as the incident took place when there was no work going on in the building, however, the damage affected the completion date of the project, which had been scheduled for June 2015.

== See also ==
- List of tallest buildings in Nigeria
- List of World Trade Centers
