= Oluwole Olumuyiwa =

Nigerian architect (1929–2000)

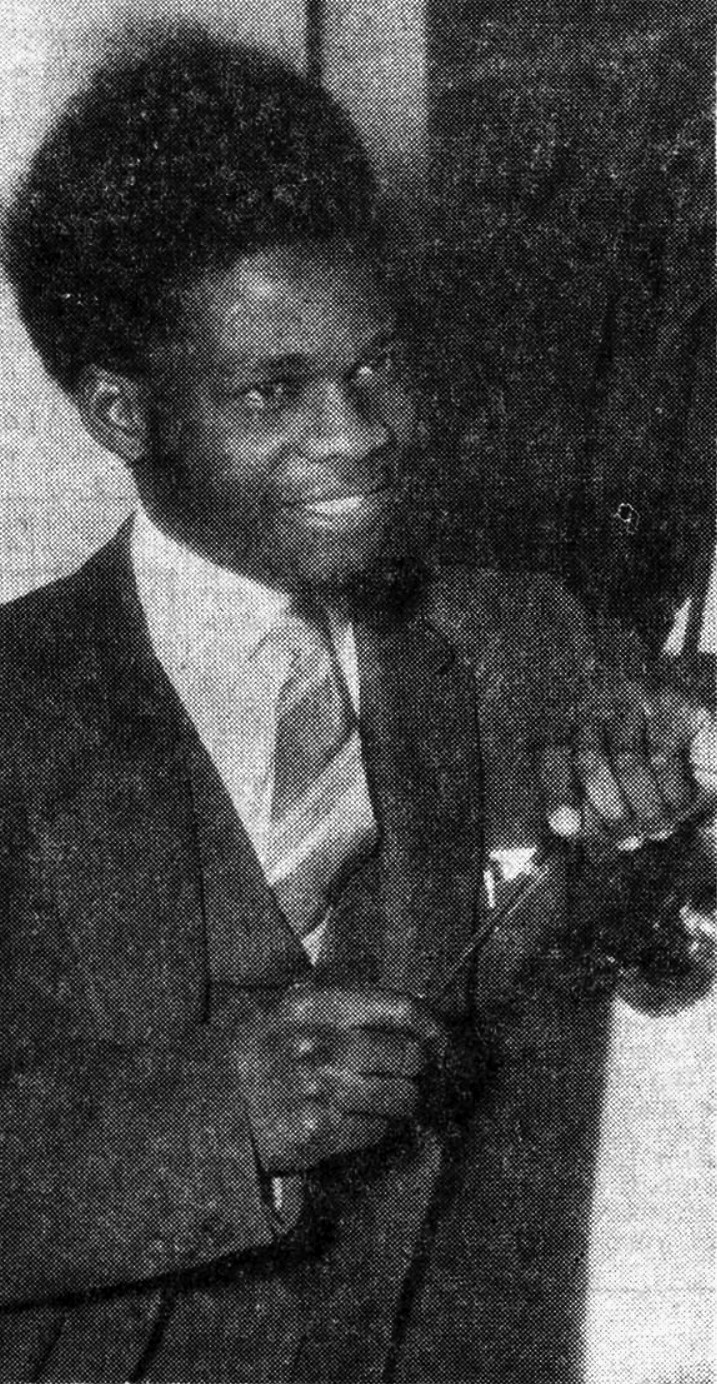
- Architect Olu from Nigeria in Rotterdam, 1955
- Born: 1929; Nigeria
- Died: 2000 (aged 70–71); Switzerland
- Education: University of Manchester
- Occupation: Architect
- Parent(s): Claudius Babington Olumuyiwa and Ernestina Omolola Olumuyiwa (nee Johnson)
- Practice: Oluwole Olumuyiwa and Associates
- Buildings: Eko Hotel and Suites; Crusader House, Lagos; Management House, Lagos; Teacher's Reference Library, Lagos
- Projects: UAC Housing Developments, Lagos; Cultural Centre, Lagos

Oluwole Olumuyiwa (1929 – 2000) was a Nigerian architect.

== Career ==
Oluwole studied Architecture and City Planning at the University of Manchester from 1949 to 1954, earning a First Class degree. He had four years of post qualification training in several European firms such as Architects' Co-Partnership in London, the office of Van den Broek and Bakema in Rotterdam, the new town developments in Emmen (the Netherlands), Stevenage (England) and in Switzerland. He also gained practical training in hospital planning.

Oluwole was the first Nigerian graduate of Architecture to return to Nigeria from abroad in 1958 and set up a practice; Oluwole Olumuyiwa and Associates in Lagos, Nigeria, in 1960. He was the first President of Architects Registration Council of Nigeria (ARCON). Oluwole was co-director of Africa's first architectural review "The West African Builder and Architect". He was Nigeria's delegate to the CAA conference in 1964 and subsequently became President of the Association. He was also involved in residential and public architecture; designing many of Nigeria's new buildings at the time, particularly schools.

== Selected projects ==
- Eko Hotels and Suites, Lagos
- Management House, Idowu Taylor Street, Lagos.
- Administrative building, Lagos
- Crusader House (multistorey commercial building in Martin's street, Lagos.)
- UAC Housing Developments, Lagos
- Teacher's Reference Library, Lagos
- Community Center, Lagos
