= Kuramo Beach =

Beach in Lagos, Nigeria

Coordinates: 6.4220°N 3.4334°E

Kuramo Beach is a sandy beach in Lagos, Nigeria, located at the south side of Victoria Island, just east of Bar Beach and south of the Kuramo Waters lagoon. It was the location of numerous illegal shanties and cabins, some of them being used for music entertainment, bars and prostitution. In August 2012, a surge of the Atlantic Ocean hit Kuramo Beach, destroying some of these shacks and killing 16 people. The next day government authorities evacuated the area, demolished the remaining shacks and began to refill the sand.

The ocean surge is said to occur every August at the beach, though in former years there were no deaths.

Some of the popular hotels to stay are Lagos Continental Hotel and Eco hotels & Suites.

== Climate and environmental issues ==
Kuramo Beach in Lagos has experienced consistent erosion over the years. There is also the sea level rise which is another shoreline development in the beach occasioned by the effect of climate change. The coastal erosion erosion disturbances in the beach has contributed to ocean surge in the beach. The surrounding part of the beach has been described as unkept with dirt and faeces at different corners of the beach.
