= Civic Tower (Lagos) =

High-rise building in Lagos

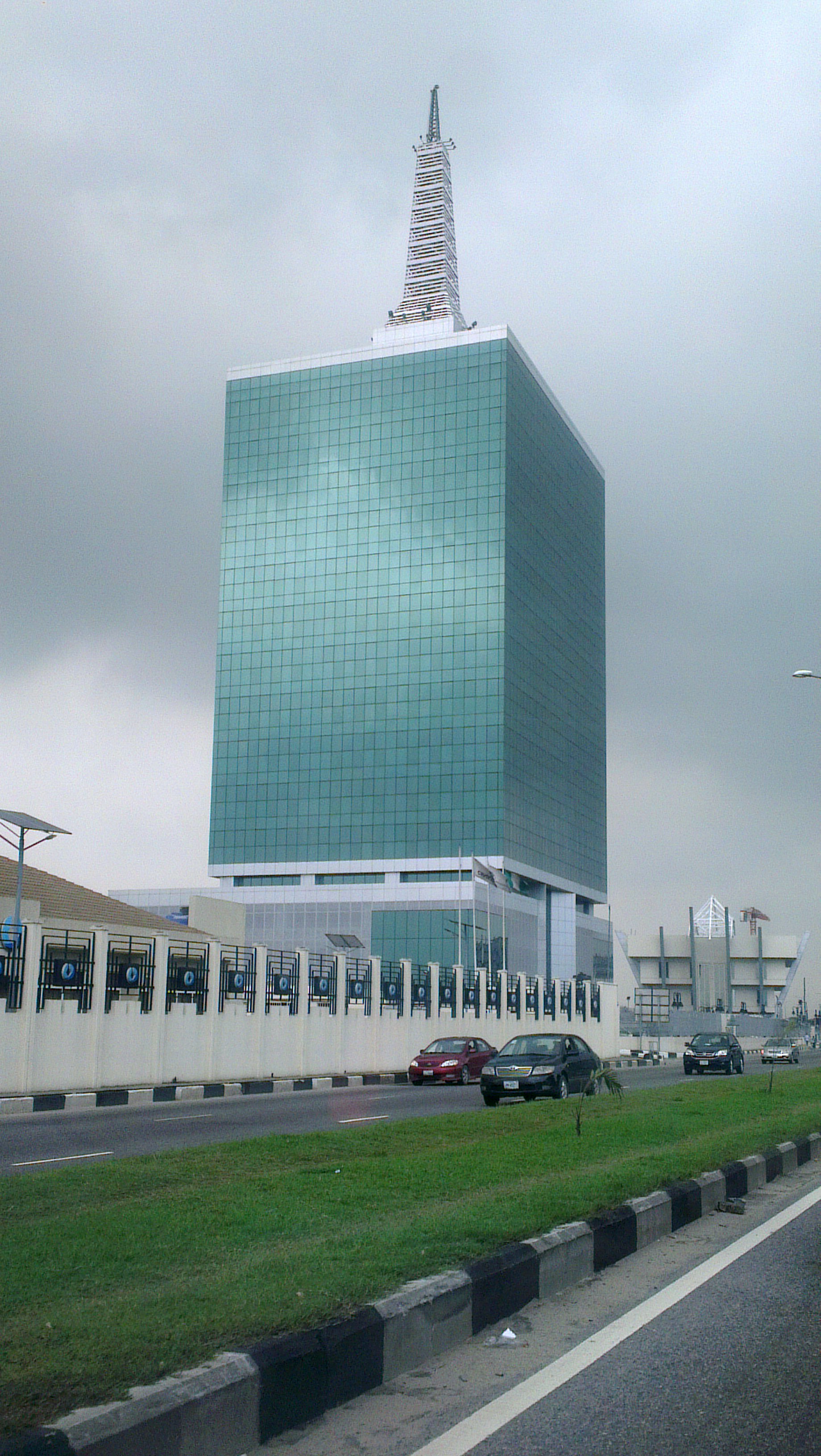
- Civic Tower
- Interactive map of the Civic Tower area

General information
- Status: Completed
- Type: Office
- Location: Victoria Island, Ozumba Mbadiwe Avenue, Lagos, Nigeria
- Coordinates: 6.4399418°N 3.4294983°E
- Completed: 2015
- Opened: August 2015; 11 years ago

Height
- Height: 90 m (300 ft)

Technical details
- Floor count: 17 (Note: Sources disagree on the building's floor count. The Skyscraper Center and SkyscraperPage stated that Civic Tower has 17 floors, The Guardian Nigeria and BusinessDay said that it has 16 floors, while Nairametrics and Encomium Magazine said that the tower has 15 floors.)

Design and construction
- Architecture firm: Interstate Architects

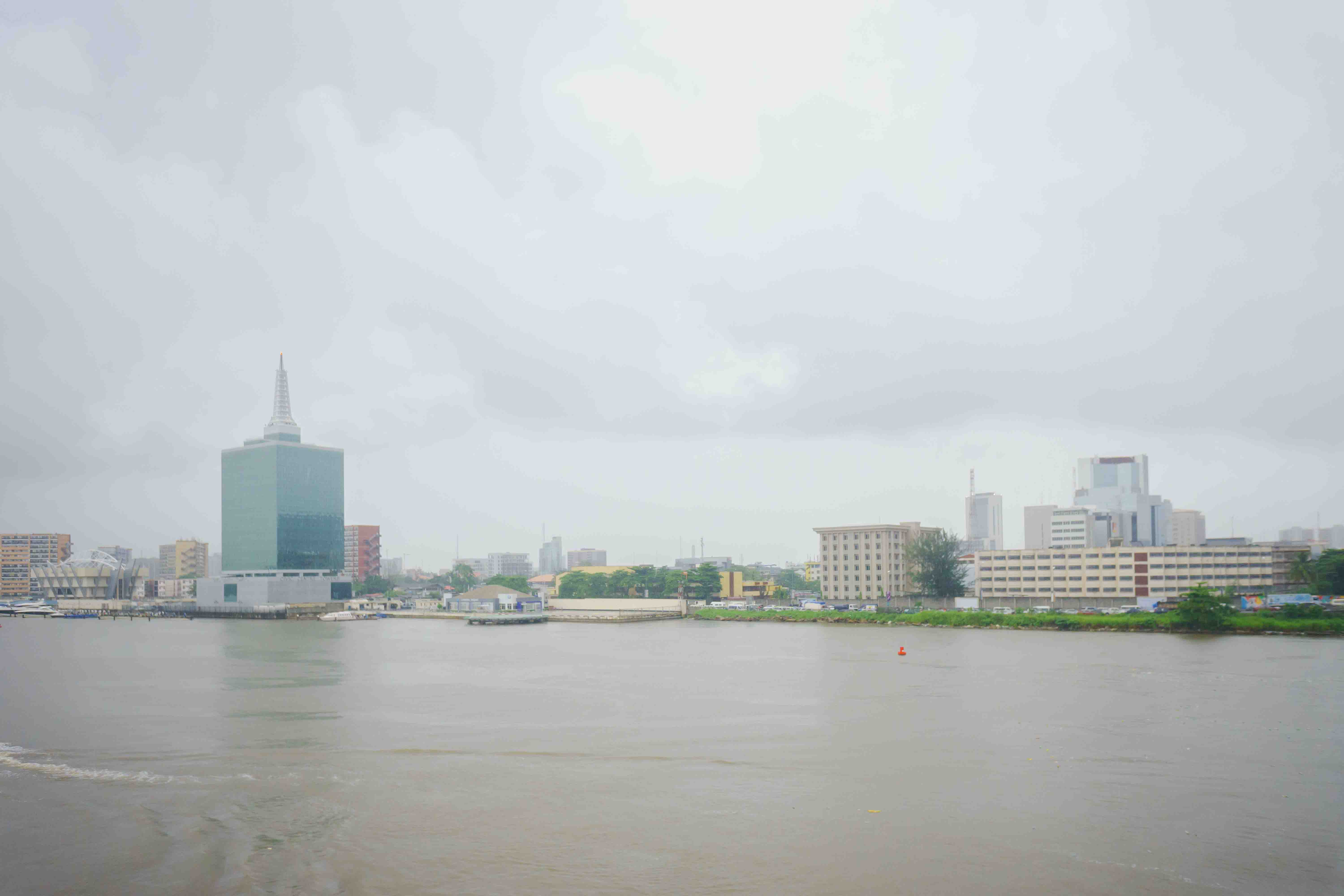
View of Civic Towers and surrounding areas

The Civic Tower, also called Civic Centre Towers, Civic Towers, is a 17 floor office building in Lagos. It is located a short distance from the Civic Centre on Ozumba Mbadiwe Avenue, Victoria Island, Lagos. Designed by Interstate Architects, it was officially opened in 2015 and is owned by a business tycoon, Jim Ovia.

On 20 July 2018, the Civic Towers and Civic Centre buildings were lit up in red to mark the 50th anniversary of Special Olympics alongside 225 iconic landmarks across the world. Immediately upon completion, the building was 100%-leased.

== See also ==
- List of tallest buildings in Nigeria
