= Ronald Chagoury =

Nigerian businessman

- Born: 8 January 1949 (age 77); Benin City, Nigeria
- Education: College des Frères Chrétiens des Écoles Chrétiennes; California State University, Long Beach
- Occupations: CEO, Chagoury Group
- Spouse: Berthe Chagoury
- Relatives: Gilbert Chagoury (brother)

Ronald Chagoury (Arabic: رونالد شاغوري; born 8 January 1949) is a Lebanese Nigerian businessman, who is the co-founder and CEO of Chagoury Group.

== Biography ==
Ronald Chagoury was born in Nigeria on January 8, 1949, the son of Ramez and Alice Chagoury, who had emigrated from Lebanon in the 1940s. He was educated at the college des Frères Chrétiens in Lebanon and studied business studies at California State University, Long Beach, US.

Chagoury is married to Berthe, and they have two children.

Chagoury's name has appeared in the Panama Papers.
