= Beverly Hills 9/11 Memorial Garden =

Memorial in Beverly Hills, California

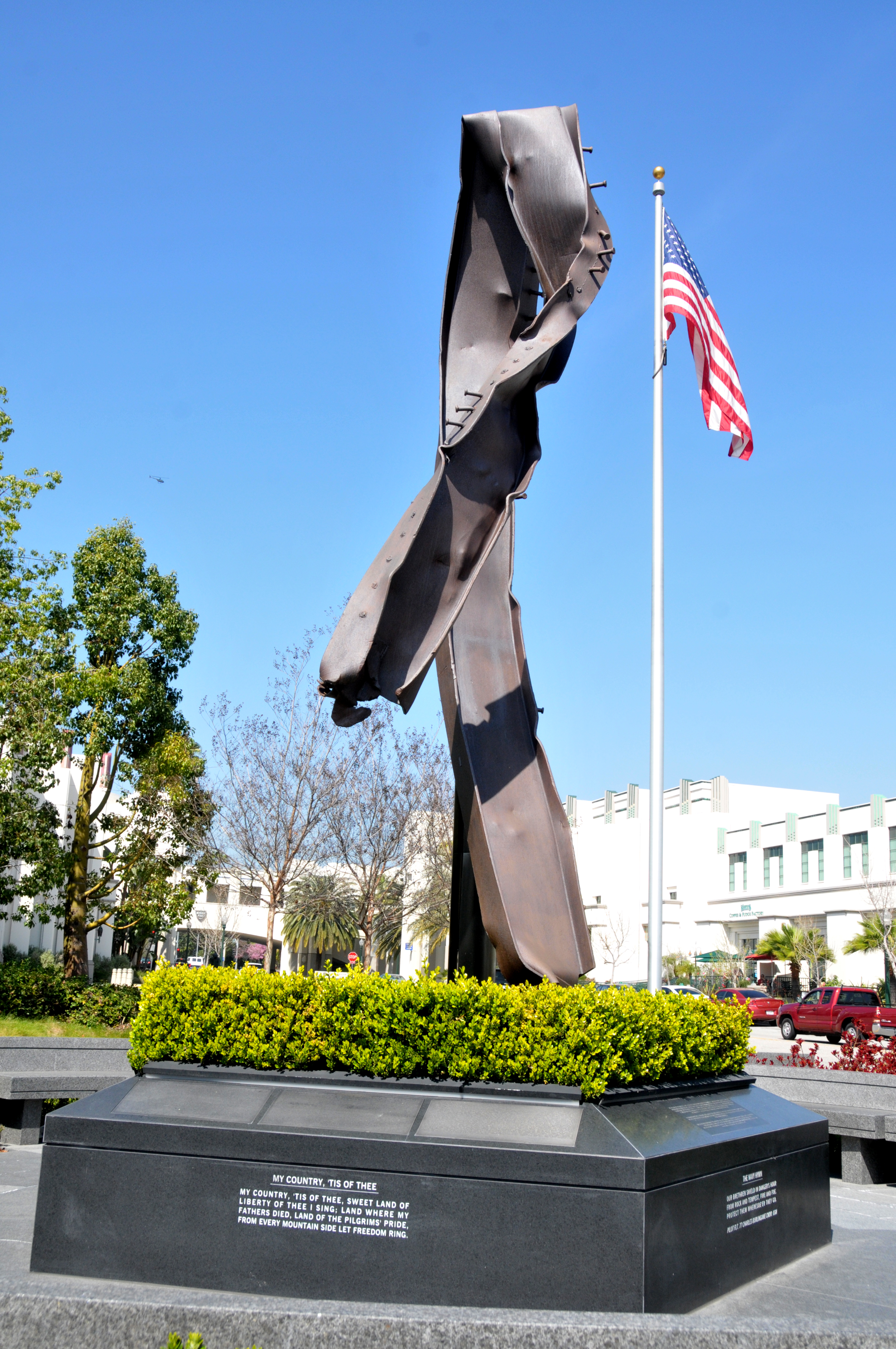
- Interactive map of Beverly Hills 9/11 Memorial Garden
- Location: Beverly Hills, California
- Coordinates: 34.072253°N 118.399532°W
- Opening date: September 11, 2011
- Dedicated to: Victims of the 9/11 attacks

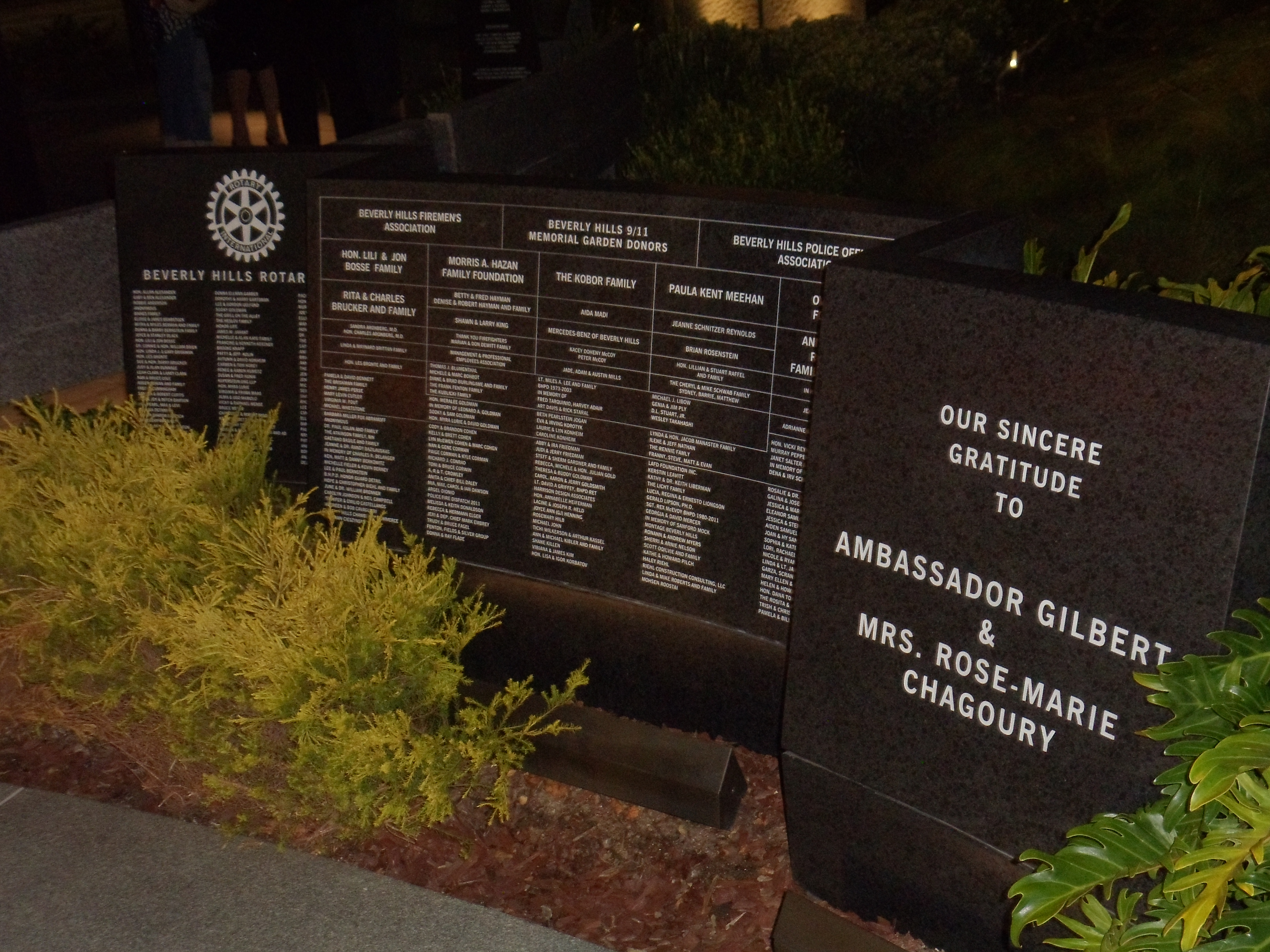
List of donors on the monument

The Beverly Hills 9/11 Memorial Garden is a memorial space in honor of the victims of the September 11 attacks in Beverly Hills, California at the corner of North Rexford Drive and South Santa Monica Boulevard/Burton Way. Dedicated on September 11, 2011, exactly ten years after the attack, it is centered on a 30-foot bent steel beam salvaged from the wreckage of the World Trade Center. It was entirely funded by private donors. It forms part of the grounds of the Beverly Hills Fire Department.

== History ==
The memorial commemorates the victims of the September 11 attacks as well as the heroism of first responders, firefighters and law enforcement officers that day.

The project was initiated in 2009, when Beverly Hills Fire Chief Timothy J. Scranton announced they had acquired a 30-foot, 1,900-pound bent floor beam taken from the wreckage of the World Trade Center. Around the beam, there are curved granite benches, meant for visitors to reflect upon the tragedy. Behind the beam, there are replicas of the Twin Towers, the Pentagon and the field near Shanksville, Pennsylvania. There are also stainless-steel plaques with the names of the 2,977 lives lost that day. Construction of the monument was overseen by McCoy Construction. It was entirely funded by private donors, who collectively gave over US$600,000. Their names are inscribed on the monument, as can be seen on the picture.

The monument was dedicated on the tenth anniversary of the attacks in 2011. To mark the dedication, commemorative challenge coins were created. The memorial is open to the public every day. Since 2011, the annual 9/11 memorial concert in Beverly Hills has taken place near the memorial garden. In 2013, the concert was performed by the Los Angeles Lawyers Philharmonic Orchestra.

== See also ==
- List of public art in Los Angeles
