= Lekki-Ikoyi Link Bridge =

Bridge in Lagos, Nigeria

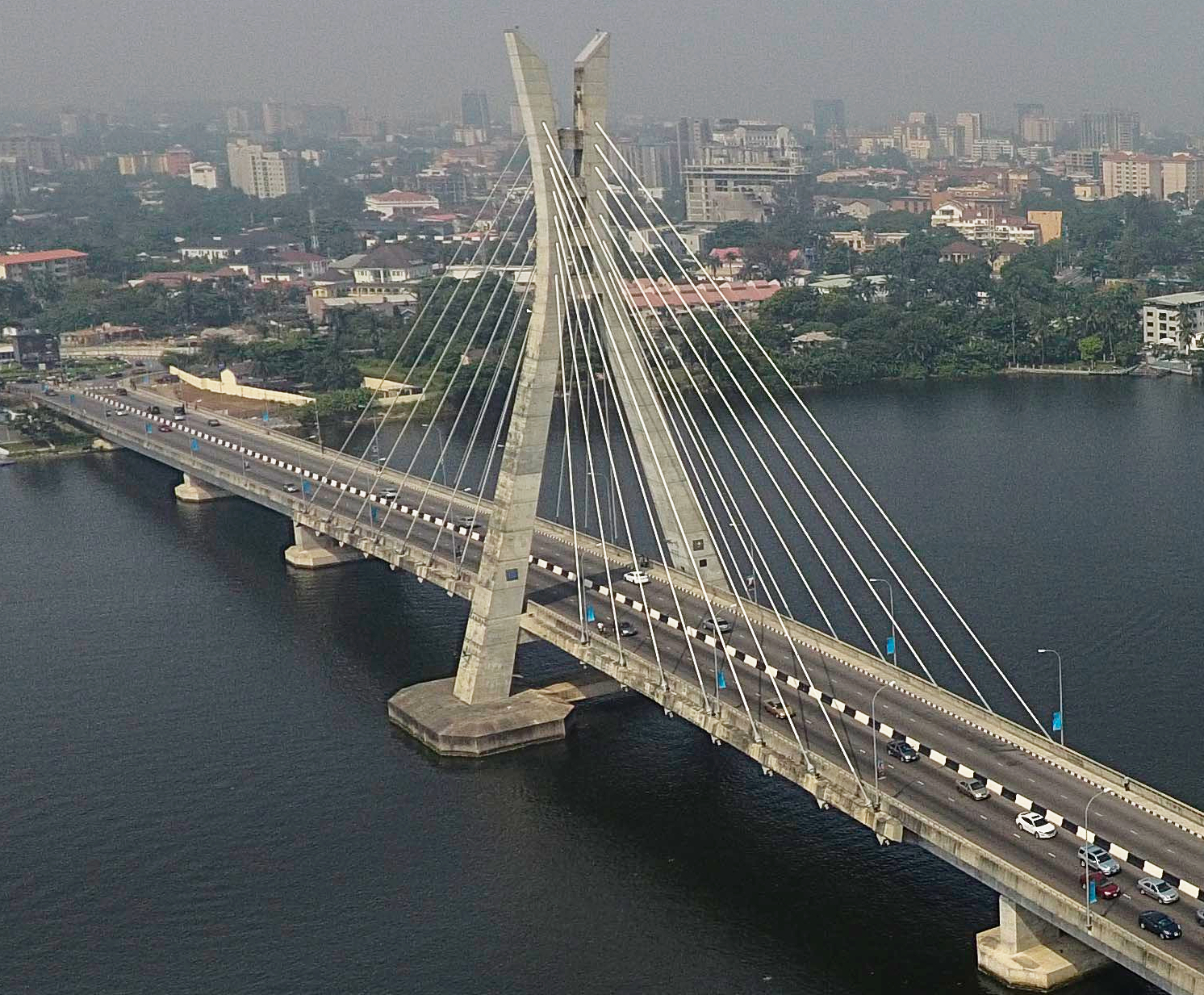
- Coordinates: 6.4502°N 3.4558°E
- Crosses: Five Cowries Creek
- Locale: Phase 1, Lekki, Lagos State; Ikoyi, Lagos, Lagos State

Characteristics
- Design: Cable-stayed
- Total length: 1.36 kilometres (0.85 mi)
- Longest span: 110 metres (360 ft)

History
- Constructed by: Julius Berger Nigeria
- Opened: 29 May 2013; 13 years ago

Location
- Interactive map of Lekki-Ikoyi Link Bridge

The Lekki-Ikoyi Link Bridge is a 1.36 km (0.85 mi) long cable-stayed bridge in Lagos State, Nigeria. It links the Phase 1 area of Lekki with the Ikoyi district of Lagos. The bridge was commissioned on 29 May 2013 by the Governor of Lagos State, Babatunde Raji Fashola.

== Design and construction ==
The bridge is the first cable-stayed bridge to be built in Nigeria and was constructed by Julius Berger Nigeria. The bridge has a 9-metre headroom above water level in order to allow for the flow of maritime traffic.

== Operation ==
The bridge is a toll bridge, although tolls have not been charged since the 2020 Lekki shooting and the End SARS protests. Its use is restricted to private and commercial vehicles with a total seating capacity not exceeding 26. The toll gate is located at the Lekki end of the bridge. Tolling has been controversial with some Lagosians believing that since the bridge was built with public funds, its use should be available at no cost.

The Lagos State government, on the other hand, has argued that the collection of tolls is not only required to maintain the bridge but also to generate funds for building other bridges to link parts of Lagos. The waterway above which the bridge is built is owned and controlled by the Federal Government of Nigeria.

Apart from vehicular traffic, the bridge also serves as a recreational facility. Fitness inclined residents of Lekki phase 1 and Ikoyi use the wide curbs of the bridge for jogging and running, usually in the early mornings and evenings. Tourists and other visitors also find this bridge as one of the places to visit and the bridge is the most photographed place in Lagos.
