= Esther Ijewere =

Nigerian social activist and author

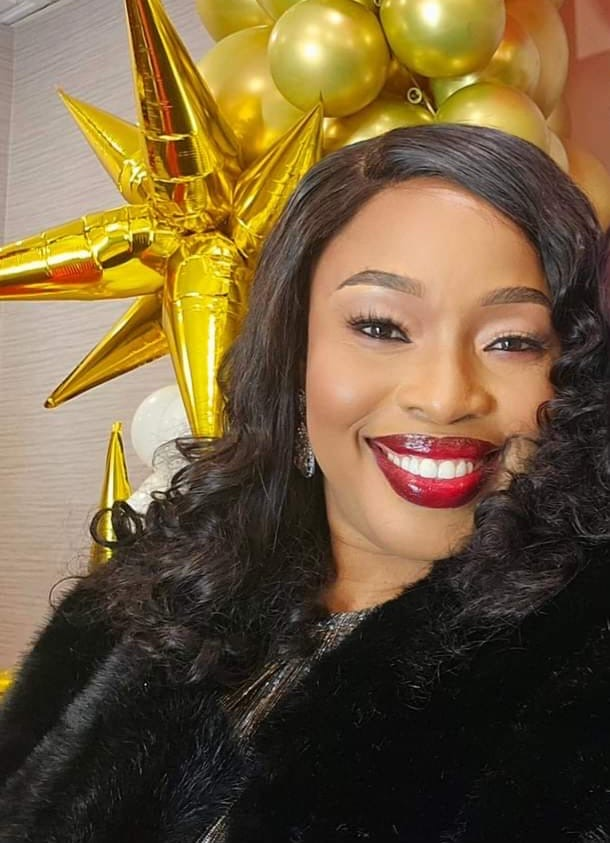
- Education: Olabisi Onabanjo University
- Occupations: Media Strategist; Author; Women's Rights Activist
- Organization(s): Rubies Ink Initiative for Women and Children, Women of Rubies Inc
- Children: 2

Esther Ijewere is a Canadian-based media and communications specialist, author, and advocate for women’s and children's rights. She is a columnist for The Guardian and the CEO of Women of Rubies, an organization dedicated to empowering and celebrating women from diverse backgrounds.

== Biography ==
=== Education ===
Ijewere is a graduate of sociology from Olabisi Onabanjo University, Ago Iwoye, Ogun State, Nigeria.

=== Career ===
Ijewere is the founder of Rubies Ink Initiative for Women and Children, an umbrella organization which covers several women and girl child-related projects including Walk Against Rape, Women of Rubies, Project Capable, Rubies Ink Media and the College Acquaintance Rape Education Workshop. At the start of her career with Rubies Ink, she had to self fund all projects.

Since 2011, Ijewere has been organizing the Walk Against Rape campaign, which attracted top celebrities like Kate Henshaw, Ali Baba, Toni Payne, DJ Jimmy Jatt and others. She is a key member of Walk Against Rape (W.A.R), an advocacy initiative created to assist rape victims and seek justice, which has been endorsed by the Lagos State Ministry Of Women Affairs and Poverty Alleviation. This campaign led her to organize rape sensitization workshops in secondary schools across Nigeria, tagged College Acquaintance Rape Education (C.A.R.E), in partnership with the Lagos State Ministry of Justice and the Domestic and Sexual Violence Response Team (DSVRT).

In 2013, her activism against rape led her to write the book Breaking the Silence, a book that informs about rape and its scourge. She runs a community for men called Men Who Inspire to celebrate the bravery in men.

In 2015, Ijewere founded Women of Rubies, a platform that started as a newspaper column aimed at empowering and celebrating women. It has since evolved into a global community, spotlighting over one thousand women via the Women of Rubies website and newspaper column. Women of Rubies operates both in Nigeria and Canada, amplifying the voices and achievements of women across the globe. In May 2022, Esther hosted the catalyst 2030 session on media and public policy during the Catalyzing Change Week 2022 (CCW2022), a virtual workshop aimed at driving social change through strategic media engagement.

In March 2023, she published her second book, How to Make Affirmations Work for You. This book offers practical guidance on the effective use of affirmations to achieve personal and professional goals. It delves into the science behind affirmations, provides step-by-step instructions for creating personalized affirmations, and includes real-life success stories to inspire readers to harness the power of positive thinking in their daily lives.

In August 2023, Ijewere kicked off the Media Visibility BootCamp, a program designed to empower individuals with the skills to enhance their media presence and amplify their impact through strategic communication. The BootCamp focuses on teaching participants how to craft compelling narratives, engage effectively with media outlets, and leverage various media platforms to increase their visibility and influence. She won the 2024 Social Impact Award at the Pesbods Gala Night, held in Toronto, Canada for her contributions to the media space.

== Publications ==
=== Get Talking with Esther ===
Get Talking with Esther is an online talk-show (Tweetchat) anchored by Esther aimed at helping people find their voice and communicate their thoughts through words, and promote positivity on social media. It started with a tweet chat in 2020 but has now evolved into a live session on Facebook and Instagram, syndicated to YouTube, where Esther hosts guests from across the globe.

=== Women of Rubies ===
She is the publisher of the platform Women of Rubies, which tells the inspirational stories of leading women in different sectors who are contributing their quota to nation-building and adding value to society through their work.

=== Media Visibility Bootcamp ===
She founded the Media Visibility Bootcamp in August 2023, aimed at empowering individuals to enhance their media presence and amplify their impact through strategic communication.

== Charity ==
With her Rubies Ink Initiative for women and children, Esther reaches out to the downtrodden in society.

== Awards and nominations ==
Her contributions to the society has been recognized by several institutions and governmental bodies. Here are some of her notable awards and nominations:

- 2016: Young Person of the Year Award at the 2016 Miss Tourism Nigeria beauty pageant
- 2016: Christian Woman in Media Award at the Wise Women Award
- 2018: Social Entrepreneur of the Year Award at the Exquisite Ladies of the Year Awards
- 2019: Social Innovation Award by Women's Radio (WFM 91.7 FM)
- 2023: 100 Black Women to Watch in Canada.
- 2023: Canada Total Mom Pitch Top 100 Semi-Finalist
- 2024: Advocacy and Catalyst for Change Award by Universal Women Network
- 2024: MIPAD Global 100 Under 40 recognition
- 2024: Media Impact Award at the Canada Vendors Entrepreneur Awards

== Personal life ==
Ijewere is a single mum of two kids. In an interview with The Sun, she advised and encouraged women facing domestic violence in their marriage to reconsider their long term stand in such relationship while speaking on separation from her former husband.
