= Chagoury Group =

Nigeria-based multinational business conglomerate

- Type: Private
- Industry: Conglomerate
- Founded: 1971
- Founders: Gilbert R. Chagoury, Ronald Chagoury
- Headquarters: Lagos, Nigeria
- Area served: Worldwide
- Key people: Gilbert R. Chagoury (Founder), Ronald Chagoury (Founder)
- Products: Construction, Property Development, Flour Mills, Water Bottling, Glass Manufacturing, Insurance, Hotels, Furniture Manufacturing, Telecommunications, Transportation, IT, Catering, International Financing
- Divisions: Real Estate Development, Industrial Division, Construction Division, Healthcare Division, Hotels and Catering

Chagoury Group is a Nigerian multinational business conglomerate headquartered in Lagos, Lagos State. Founded in 1971 by Gilbert R. Chagoury and Ronald Chagoury, their businesses include construction and property development, flour mills, water bottling and purification, glass manufacturing, insurance, hotels, furniture manufacturing, telecommunications, transportation, IT, catering and international financing.

== Real estate development ==
Projects include the Eko Atlantic City, located next to Victoria Island in Lagos State. The project will be built on reclaimed land that has been lost to coastal erosion.

== Industrial division ==
The Grands Moulins du Bénin Flour Mill began production in 1972 and now produces 250 metric tons of wheat flour per day, with wheat imported from France and the US.

Projects include: Port Harcourt Flour Mills; Ideal Flour Mills; Nigerian Eagle Flour Mills; Niger Delta Flour Mills; Tin Can Island; Ragolis Waters; Glassforce; Pirotech; Silhouette Furniture.

== Construction division ==
C & C Construction Company Limited was the first company within the construction division of the Chagoury Group of companies. Projects completed include: Ideal Flour Mills; Nigerian Eagle Flour Mills; Tin Can Island Grain Receiving Facility and associated Storage Silos; The State Security Headquarters Building in Abuja, Nigeria; A housing, school and leisure complex for Elf Petroleum Nigeria Limited; a foreshore development project in Osborne Road, Ikoyi. Current projects include: Ocean Parade Towers, a luxury residential development on Banana Island in Lagos Lagoon; The Nigerian Defence Academy.

ITB Construction is a civil engineering and construction company headquartered in Lagos and has a regional facility in Abuja. The company focuses on the construction of residential and industrial buildings. The company also manufactures pilings and provides electro-mechanical services and product, including generators. Completed projects include: The National Assembly Complex in Abuja; A residential development project of 13 floors on Victoria Island; and the design and construction of a staff housing complex of 800 units for client ALSCON's Aluminium Smelter Plant. Current projects include: Intercontinental Hotel on Victoria Island (with 19 floors, this will be the tallest building on the island); a new HQ for Magnum Trust Bank of Nigeria; and the new headquarters and office complex for TOTAL oil company in Port Harcourt.

Hitech Construction was founded in 1988, the civil engineering company specializes in general infrastructure projects including road works, street lighting, railways, drainage systems, bridges, dams, earthworks, asphalt overlay, water supply, irrigation schemes, dredging, and marine installations. Hitech's clients include: the Aluminium Smelting Company of Nigeria; the Federal Ministry of Works; Abia State Government; Bayelsa State Government; Lagos State Government; and Nigerian Breweries PLC.

Completed projects include a sea wall along Bar Beach, in Eko Atlantic. This is the first project of its kind in Africa to use advanced 'x-blocs', enormous x-shaped concrete blocks designed to dissipate the energy of waves.

Fleetwood Transportation was established in 1989 and headquartered in Lagos, the company operates a fleet of trucks including grain carriers, flatbed, sided and tipper trucks. Fleetwood is a member of the Nigerian Association of Road Transport Owners (NARTO).

== Healthcare division ==
Established in 1991, the Ideal Eagle Hospital is a small private medical facility in Lagos. Although mainly serving employees of the Chagoury Group, the hospital is also retained by a number of Nigerian-based multinational companies, including Royal Dutch Shell.

== Hotels and catering ==
Properties include Eko Hotel and Suites in Lagos; Hotel Presidential in Port Harcourt; and Courdeau Catering.
