= List of Lebanese people in Africa =

This is a list of notable individuals born in Africa (outside the Arab World / North Africa) of Lebanese ancestry or people of dual Lebanese and local nationality born and/or residing in Africa.

== Ghana ==
- Juliet Ibrahim, actress
- Janet Yawson, long jumper
- Sonia Ibrahim, actress and television presenter
- Majid Michel, actor

== Ivory Coast ==
- Mehdi Khalil, footballer
- Monique Séka, singer
- Nader Matar, footballer
- Mahmoud Kojok, footballer

== Liberia ==
- Monie Captan, former foreign minister of Liberia
- Fouad Hijazi, footballer
- Wael Nazha, footballer

== Nigeria ==
- Gilbert Chagoury, businessman, diplomat and philanthropist
- Hassan El Mohamad, footballer
- Margaret Vogt , diplomat

== Sierra Leone ==
- Edward J. Akar, former Minister of Finance
- Tarek El Ali, footballer
- Faisal Antar, footballer
- Roda Antar, footballer
- Kassim Basma, diamond exporter
- Nabih Berri, Sierra Leone-born Speaker of the Lebanese Parliament
- Wendy Bangura, actress and film producer
- Samir Hassaniyeh, activist
- Ali Hijazi, head coach of the Sierra Leone national basketball team
- Nahim Khadi, current president of the Sierra Leone Football Association
- Hisham Mackie, diamond exporter
- Farid Raymond-Anthony, writer and author
- John Saad, former Minister of Housing and Infrastructural Development
- Walid Shour, footballer

== South Africa ==
- Fulton Allem, professional golfer#
- Ken Costa, London-based South African banker and Christian philanthropist
- Pierre Issa, professional football (soccer) player
- Joseph Rahme, professional tennis player
- Stephen Saad, CEO Aspen Pharmacare
- Michael Sutherland, South African-born Australian politician
- Allan Thomas, professional footballer
- Vic Toweel, professional boxer
- Willie Toweel, professional boxer

== Senegal ==
- Ycare, singer
- Xaiver Boissy, judoka

== See also ==
- List of Lebanese people
- List of Lebanese people (Diaspora)
- Lebanese diaspora
- Lebanese people in Ivory Coast
- Lebanese people in South Africa
- Lebanese people in Senegal
- Lebanese people in Sierra Leone
