= Lebanese people in West Africa =

Lebanese diaspora in West Africa
Total population
- 250,000

Regions with significant populations
- Ivory Coast: 100,000-300,000
- Senegal: 50,000-150,000
- Nigeria: 30,000
- Sierra Leone: 3,000

Languages
- Arabic (Lebanese) · French · Languages of the Ivory Coast (Including Akan languages) · Wolof · Nigerian languages (Including Hausa, Yoruba and Nigerian and Pidgin English)

Religion
- Christianity (Maronite, Greek Orthodox, Melkite, Eastern Orthodox and Protestant) · Islam (Shia and Sunni) · Druze

Related ethnic groups
- Lebanese diaspora

The Lebanese diaspora in West Africa refers to people of Lebanese descent who migrated to West Africa, or people who are descended from them, and likely numbers over 250,000 people. The Ivory Coast has the largest Lebanese population, estimated to be as high as 300,000 people.

Early immigrations occurred chiefly from Ottoman Lebanon in the late 19th century, and later on from the French Protectorate, and there has been significant mobility between the West African Lebanese populations, and some of the earliest Lebanese migrants to the Ivory Coast came not from Lebanon, but from Senegal. They also began taking residence in urban areas of West Africa outside of capitals during the 20th century, and immigration to West African countries from Lebanon by members of different religious groups still occurs today.

== History ==
=== Colonial Era ===
The first waves of Lebanese immigration to West Africa began in the late 19th century, when Lebanon was an Ottoman possession, and many Lebanese left due to various pressures, including famine, poverty, and a silk-worm crisis in Lebanon. Many ended up in Nigeria and Sierra Leone en route to North America, and ended up stranded there due to financial difficulty, with many of the durables (established families) becoming an entrepreneurial class in these countries. The first Lebanese migrants to Anglophone West Africa were largely Maronite Christians, but at the beginning of the 20th century, due to an agricultural crunch in south Lebanon, many Shia Muslim Lebanese began to migrate as well, this time coming to West Africa to seek out the established Lebanese communities there.

The Lebanese community in the Ivory Coast arrived after World War I, when Lebanon was a French Mandate. Many Lebanese fled the persecution under the mandate, which led them to end up in French West Africa, with some having intended once again to travel on to countries like the United States, but finding travel to West Africa to be far cheaper. Many immigrants who came to Nigeria and Ghana were initially deceived by ship captains upon departure from Marseille, that they would be taken to America.

The second wave of Lebanese migration to West Africa began with the Lebanese Civil War in the 1970s. By the late 1980s, reportedly 60,000 to 120,000 Lebanese and Syrians lived in the Ivory Coast, although some observers gave a figure as high as 300,000. Today, Lebanese people are still immigrating to live in the existing communities in countries like Nigeria, due to many factors, such as recent unrest in Lebanon.

== Culture ==
The Lebanese community of West Africa is largely endogamous, and due to their status as colonial intermediaries, with many Lebanese today travelling back and forth between Lebanon and West Africa, combined with decades of legislation designed to inhibit widespread Lebanese naturalisation in the countries, have contributed to Lebanese West Africans being quite unassimilated when compared to other diaspora populations. Since the beginning of the 21st century however, Lebanese citizenship rights have been improving across the countries.

=== Religion ===
A significant amount of Lebanese West Africans are Maronite Christians, and Shia Muslims, as well as Sunnis, and Druze.

The Lebanese Maronite community has been crucial for the establishment of Eastern Christianity in Nigeria; notably, Ibadan hosts the eparchial seat of the Maronite Catholic Eparchy of the Annunciation — the Maronite eparchy that covers much of Sub-Saharan Africa.

=== Families ===
Due to being viewed as an entrepreneurial class in West Africa, there are many prominent Lebanese families, including the Ivory Coast's Ezzedin (عز الدين) and Fhakoury (الفاخوري) families of the Ivory Coast, who give their name to manufacturers, and business and media families in Nigeria and Togo, like the Chagoury, Darwish, Khouri and Moussalli families.

== See also ==
- Lebanese diaspora
- List of Lebanese people in Africa
- Lebanese people in Ivory Coast
- Lebanese Nigerians
- Lebanese people in Senegal
- Lebanese people in Sierra Leone
- Ghanaian Arabs

== Bibliography ==
- Handloff, Robert E., ed. (1988), "The Levantine Community", Ivory Coast, Library of Congress Country Studies, Washington, DC
- Peleikis, Anja (2000), "The emergence of a translocal community: the case of a south Lebanese village and its migrant connections to Ivory Coast" (PDF), Cahiers d'études sur la Méditerranée orientale et le monde turco-iranien (30): 297–317
