= Nkrumah =

Nkrumah is a surname. Notable people with the surname include:

- Aaron Nkrumah (born 2001), American basketball player
- Daniel Nkrumah (born 2003), English footballer
- Fathia Nkrumah (1932–2007), wife of Kwame Nkrumah and First Lady of Ghana
- Gamal Nkrumah (born 1959), Ghanaian journalist
- Kwame Nkrumah (1909–1972), the first Prime Minister and then first President of Ghana
- Samia Nkrumah (born 1960), Ghanaian journalist and politician
- Kwame Nkrumah-Acheampong (born 1979), Ghanaian skier
- Kojo Oppong Nkrumah (born 1982), a Ghanaian journalist, politician and lawyer

== See also ==
- Nkrumah University, a university in Zambia.
- Kwame Nkrumah University of Science and Technology, a university in Kumasi, Ghana.
- Kwame Nkrumah Ideological Institute, a former educational institute in Winneba, Ghana.
- Kwame Nkrumah Mausoleum, a memorial in Accra, Ghana, dedicated to Kwame Nkrumah.
- FPSO Kwame Nkrumah, an oil storage and offloading vessel named after Kwame Nkrumah.
