= Dorcas Affo-Toffey =

Ghanaian entrepreneur, philanthropist and politician

Hon. Dorcas Affo-Toffey MP
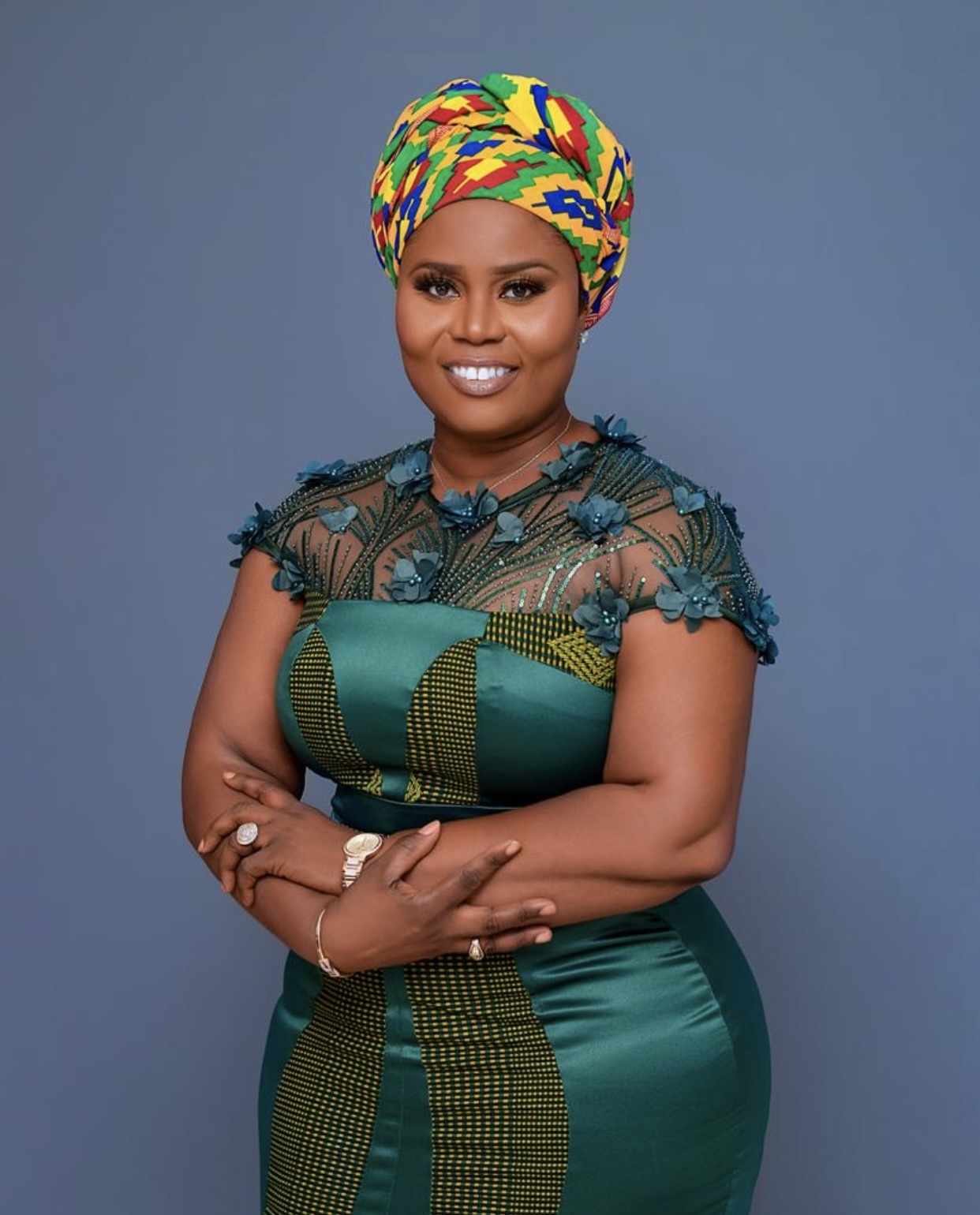

Member of Parliament for Jomoro Constituency
- Incumbent
- Assumed office 7 January 2021
- Preceded by: Paul Essien

Personal details
- Party: National Democratic Congress
- Children: 2
- Occupation: Entrepreneur

Dorcas Affo-Toffey (born 4 May 1975) is a Ghanaian entrepreneur, philanthropist and politician. She is a member of the National Democratic Congress (NDC). She is the member of parliament for the Jomoro Constituency in the Western Region.

== Early life and education ==
Dorcas Affo-Toffey was born on 4 May 1975, in Tikobo No. 1 to the late Stephen Ackah Toffey and Mary Afo Danyi. She was born into a large family, the 18th born of her father's twenty-three children but the last born of her mother's five children. She had her basic school in Tikobo No. 1 and Ideal Preparatory school in Takoradi and gained admission to the Nkroful Agriculture Secondary School in 1986 where she had her secondary school education. After completing her secondary school education, she relocated to the United States to join her brothers. During that period she studied courses on dental hygiene, real estate management, branding and customer service.

She holds a diploma in branding and customer service management. She later completed a Bachelor of Science degree in marketing at Knutsford University College. She has a Master of Business Administration (MBA) in marketing from Knutsford University College.

In 2024, Affo-Toffey received her Master of Business Administration (Generic) from Accra Business School. She also received Master of Science (MSc.) in Energy and Sustainability Management from Regent University College.

== Career ==
For over 25 years, Afo-Toffey worked in different sectors during her stay in the U.S. The sectors encompassed health, education administration, real estate development, entrepreneurship and philanthropy fields. Since 2002, she has established and managed several companies in Atlanta, Georgia, which included; Queen D Beauty and Topeka Properties, a building and construction firm. She is also a senior partner of Selfie Homes in Atlanta. She returned to Ghana in 2012 to continue her entrepreneurship career of which she is currently the chief executive officer and Country Representative for Nano Fix IT Company, and Sebastian Closet Inc respectively.

== Politics ==
=== Parliamentary bid ===
8th Parliament of the 4th Republic of Ghana

Affo-Toffey was elected as the National Democratic Congress parliamentary candidate for the Jomoro Constituency in August 2019. She got 1,324 votes (87.4%) whilst the other two candidates Akatia Kwaidoo receiving 188 votes (12.4%), and Nda Blay Armah receiving 4 votes (0.2%).

Affo-Toffey won the 2020 parliamentary elections for Jomoro Constituency after receiving 24,356 votes representing 55.5% against the incumbent member of parliament Paul Essien of the New Patriotic Party who had 19,889 votes (44.95%). Since 7 January 2021, she has been one of the 40 women and the only one from the Western Region representing their respective constituencies in the 8th Parliament.

9th Parliament of the 4th Republic of Ghana

In the December 2024 parliamentary elections, Affo-Toffey, successfully maintained her seat, achieving a significant victory of 25,349 votes. Her closest competitor, Paul Essien from the New Patriotic Party (NPP), secured 14,195 votes. Nana Blay Mienzah, the parliamentary candidate for the Convention People's Party (CPP), received 306 votes. Independent candidate Samia Yaba Christina Nkrumah obtained 8,065 votes.

=== Member of Parliament ===
8th Parliament of the 4th Republic of Ghana

On 7 January 2021, Affo-Toffey was sworn in as the Member of Parliament representing the Jomoro Constituency in the 8th Parliament of Ghana. She serves as a member on the Gender and Children Committee and the Lands and Forestry Committee of Parliament.

In her maiden address on the floor of parliament on 24 March 2021, she urged the government to reopen land borders which had been closed due to the COVID-19 pandemic to boost economic activities. She stressed on the urgent need to reopen and regularize land border crossing at key entry points in the Jomoro Constituency such as Elubo, Jaway wharf, Newtown, Ellenda wharf and other border towns in Ghana. This was due to having several towns in her constituency serving as border towns between Ghana and Ivory Coast.

9th Parliament of the 4th Republic of Ghana

On 7 January 2025, Affo-Toffey was sworn in as the Member of Parliament representing the Jomoro Constituency in the 9th Parliament of Ghana for another four-year term.

=== Challenging her Eligibility ===
After winning the 2020 Parliamentary election, Affo-Toffey was accused of holding a dual citizenship by Joshua Emuah Kofie, a resident of Nuba-Mpataba in her constituency. A court case was then instituted against her challenging her citizenship. At the last court hearing she did not show up and this led to a court bench warrant being issued against her on December 6, 2021. However, on December 9, 2021, Affo-Toffey appeared in court with her lawyer, Edudzi Kudzo Tamaklo, and the MP for Ellembelle, Emmanuel Armah-Kofi Buah. The Sekondi Commercial Court A after short proceedings, rescinded the bench warrant instituted against her.

== Sports ==
On 24 March 2021, Affo-Toffey completed the purchase of the Ghana Division One League club Proud United. The club's name was changed to Jomoro FC and relocated from Accra, Greater Accra Region to Jomoro in the Western Region. The club was set to play its home games at the Crosby Awuah Memorial Park (CAM), in Aiyinase, home grounds of Karela United following the takeover.

== Personal life ==
She is married and has two daughters: Francine Koffi (Fantana, a musician in Ghana) and Lynelle Koffi (a cybersecurity professional in the USA).
