= Lebanese people in South Africa =

Total population
- 20,000

Regions with significant populations
- Johannesburg and Cape Town

Languages
- Arabic (Lebanese Arabic), English, Afrikaans, French

Religion
- Christianity and Islam

Lebanese people in South Africa have a population of around 20,000. In addition, an increasing number of Lebanese students seeking education and career opportunities opted for the country in light of its relatively reputable institutions across the Middle East. Most of the Lebanese people in South Africa live mainly in the cities of Johannesburg and Cape Town.

== History ==
The history of the Lebanese community goes back to the late 19th century, when the first immigrants arrived in Johannesburg, the biggest city in the Transvaal (province) coming from Sebhel, Mesyara, Becharre, Hadath El-Joube, Maghdoushe and other places. It is recorded that in 1896 the first Maronite and Lebanese immigrants arrived in Durban, Cape Town, and Mozambique, and congregated around their local Catholic churches. The majority of the Lebanese immigrants were Maronite and being concerned about keeping their Maronite faith alive in a new country, they wrote to the Maronite Patriarch, insisting on the need for a Maronite priest to come to South Africa to continue their tradition and the Maronite rite. In 1905, Patriarch Elias Peter Hoayek sent Father Emmanuel El-Fadle to South Africa from Kfarhata–Elzawye, North Lebanon. Father El-Fadle converted a building in Johannesburg into a church and residence.

In 1910, Father Ashkar arrived to build a church and a home for the priests. The Patriarch, then sent another priest to assist – Father Wakim Estphan. Fr. Ashkar returned to Lebanon and retired in 1928. The mission was then handed over to the Congregation of Maronite Lebanese Missionaries. Father Yousef Juan, who was appointed as a temporary visitor, received instruction from the Patriarch and the General Superior for Father Yousef Moubarak to succeed him in serving the South African Maronite community. The Congregation of Maronite Lebanese Missionaries have since served in South Africa among other countries and continue in their mission in serving and assisting in the Maronite rite.

=== Apartheid ===
Lebanese people living during the apartheid era were only classified as white from 1914. They were originally not considered as such, instead being classified as Asian South African. The white status of the Lebanese community was first affirmed in 1914, when Moses Gandur, a Maronite from Syria, sued the South African government, as he was initially denied the right to purchase land in Johannesburg due to being classified as non-white. Gandur's lawyers successfully argued that the Lebanese and Syrians originated from the Canaan, the birthplace of Christianity and Judaism, and that the laws didn't target Jews, who were also part of the Semitic race. Therefore, if other people from the Levant were being subjected to those laws, then so should the Jews. From this point on, Lebanese people in South Africa were classified as white, and this status was maintained after the Population Registration Act came into force in 1950, although immigration from Lebanon and Syria was restricted.

Through this time period, Lebanese South Africans generally enjoyed the same high living standards as other white South Africans. However, the Lebanese community maintained a silent (if not timid) opposition to apartheid and the National Party.

== Lebanese people in South Africa ==
- Fulton Allem, professional golfer
- A. C. Chemaly, general officer in the South African Army
- Ken Costa, London-based South African banker and Christian philanthropist
- Al Debbo, actor and comedian
- Pierre Issa, professional football (soccer) player
- Azar Jammine, political economist
- Joseph Rahme, professional tennis player
- John Shalala, businessman and CEO of Jetline group of companies.
- Michael Sutherland, South African-born Australian politician
- Allan Thomas, professional footballer
- Vic Toweel, professional boxer
- Willie Toweel, professional boxer
- Leanne Manas, media personality

== See also ==
- Arab diaspora
- Lebanese diaspora
- Lebanese people in Ivory Coast
- Lebanese people in Senegal
- Lebanese people in Sierra Leone
- Immigration to South Africa
