= Kwesi Yankah =

Ghanaian academic

Minister of Tertiary Education
- President: Nana Akuffo-Addo

Personal details
- Born: Ghana
- Party: New Patriotic Party
- Relations: Kojo Yankah (brother)
- Children: 3
- Education: Indiana University Bloomington
- Profession: Academic

Kwesi Yankah is a Ghanaian academic, author, and university administrator. He is a professor of linguistics and oral literature specializing in the ethnography of communications. He has served as the Pro-vice-chancellor of the University of Ghana and the president of the Central University. The author of several books, he was inducted as a fellow of the Ghana Academy of Arts and Sciences in 1999. He is currently the Ghanaian Minister of State in charge of tertiary education.

== Education and working life ==
Kwesi Yankah's doctoral thesis earned him the Esther Kinsley Award for Outstanding Doctoral Dissertation at Indiana University Bloomington, United States. He spent most of his working life in academia and lectured at the University of Ghana. He held several positions in the university, where he was dean of students of the university as well as dean of the Faculty of Arts and head of Linguistics Department. His last position at the university was that of pro-vice-chancellor for academic and student affairs. In September 2011, he succeeded Professor Victor Gadzekpo as the president of the Central University in Ghana. Yankah's appointment coincided with Rev. Prof. Addow Obeng's appointment as Central University's pro vice chancellor. Yankah served as the university president until March 2017, when he was appointed a minister of state.

During his working life, Yankah also contributed to several newspapers, among them The Mirror and Catholic Standard. He has authored many books, including Speaking for the Chief: Okyeame and the Politics of Royal Oratory.

== Affiliations and memberships ==
Yankah has been Senior External Advisor, Center for Local Strategies Research, University of Washington, and a Member of the Policy Working Group, African Presidential Archives and Research Centre, Boston University. In 1999, he was elected Fellow of the Ghana Academy of Arts and Sciences in Accra. He served a three-year term as the Honorary Secretary of the academy from 2003.

== Awards and honours ==
In July 2016, Yankah was honoured at the 2016 Africa Summit for his contribution to education in Ghana and his contribution to Africa's development.

== Minister of State ==
In March 2017, Ghana President Nana Akufo-Addo nominated him as a Minister of State in charge of tertiary education. Yankah appeared before the Appointments Committee of Parliament on 27 March 2017. During his vetting, he made it clear that he was not just a sympathizer of the New Patriotic Party, but had for years been a registered member. He told the committee that if confirmed, he would introduce new courses in public universities, as most of their curricula was getting outdated. He pledged to ensure that universities remained true to their core mandate of knowledge exchange rather than the new paradigm which sought to actively engage in revenue generation ventures.

He was approved by the Parliament of Ghana and took his oath of office in April 2017. He has been actively engaged in the planning and implementation of the Free SHS Policy of the Akufo-Addo administration. Yankah is credited with writing the title song for the government's Free SHS policy.

== Personal life ==
Yankah is married, with three children. He is the brother of Kojo Yankah, who served as Member of Parliament and a Minister under the government of Jerry John Rawlings of the NDC. Kwesi Yankah is a member of the Catholic Church in Ghana.
