= Hossam Badrawi =

Egyptian physician and politician

Secretary-General of the National Democratic Party
- In office 5 February 2011 – 16 April 2011
- Preceded by: Safwat El-Sherif

Personal details
- Born: 1951 (age 74–75) Mansoura, Egypt
- Party: Union Party
- Other political affiliations: Egypt Revival Party; National Democratic Party
- Education: Cairo University
- Profession: Physician, Professor
- Website: www.hossambadrawi.com/en/

Hossam Badrawi (Arabic: حسام بدراوى) is an Egyptian physician and politician who served as the last secretary-general of the National Democratic Party. Badrawi owns the Nile Badrawi Hospital in Cairo’s Maadi district. He is also the founder of the Union Party.

== Educational background ==
Hossam Badrawi graduated from Cairo University Kasr ElAini, faculty of medicine with an honours degree in 1974. He went to Wayne State University-Detroit-Michigan between 1979 and 1983, where he obtained his graduate studies in the use of scanning electron microscopy. Badrawi then completed his post graduate studies at Northwestern University, and fulfilled graduate studies in Curricula and study programs’ methodologies and development in Boston University. In 2007, Prof. Badrawi obtained his PhD in science from Sunderland University in the United Kingdom, for outstanding work in higher education reform in the Middle East region and an honorary fellowship from Cardiff Metropolitan University Wales, UK in 2014.

== Career ==
=== Academics ===
Badrawi published 120 research papers in his field obstetrics and gynecology, and participated in eight text books that are related to his field. His latest book about reforming education was published in November 2011.

=== Political life ===
Badrawi came from a family that affiliated with Egypt’s liberal Al-Wafd party. He entered the political life himself in the second half of the 1990s. In 2000, he joined the National Democratic Party with ex-president Hosni Mubarak, who was ruling the party, alongside his son, Gamal Mubarak.

Badrawi won a seat in the assembly that he occupied before for five years, in which he headed the parliamentary committee on fields like the education and the scientific research. Within the party and in the parliament itself, Badrawi established several initiatives on education that strived to improve the educational system in Egypt. Badrawi started an extensive reform program for all the high school and the university levels, in which policy papers on education-related issues were made.

In addition, Badrawi became one of the members of the National Council for Human Rights in 2004 and stayed till 2007, where he helped head the council’s committee on issues regarding social rights. He also became a member of the board of trustees in the Bibliotheca Alexandria in Egypt.

Badrawi lost his seat in the parliament, when he ran again in 2005, when his own party played against him as he was known to be the opposition from within.

In 2010, Badrawi announced that he is philosophically against political position inheritance, yet he respects Democracy, he criticized the opposition for refusing to let Gamal Mubarak or any other civilian to run in the presidential elections so long as it is within democratic platform. Accordingly, one of his famous quotes is, “If President Hosni Mubarak doesn’t stand in 2011 elections, it’s natural that the NDP select One of its leaders as its candidate.” One of his famous political positions was his refusal to extend the state of Emergency, against his party and government directions, and his call to change article 77 of the constitution to limit the presidency terms to 2 times only, a position that was not accepted neither by the president or the old guards of the ruling party.

=== 25 January Revolution ===
Badrawi was appointed by ex-president Hosni Mubarak, during the Egyptian revolution of 2011 on 5 February. He became the new secretary general of Hosni Mubarak's ruling NDP to replace NDP stalwart Safwat El-Sherif as party secretary general. On 11 February, less than a week after, he resigned from the position and the party. This was in attempt to still try and save the situation, when the protests intensified everywhere in Egypt. Badrawi announced his support to the revolution, by recommending Hosni Mubarak to step down, delegate his powers to vice president Omar Suleiman, and call for early elections, but Mubarak refused to make this move. One of the quotes that he announced regarding the advice he gave to Mubarak then was, “Egypt isn’t in need of tragic developments that don’t allow for economic development. We want work. We want companies to make profits and pay taxes. We want safety and stability.”

When Hosni Mubarak refused to resign and came out to his people with a speech on 10 February that said he was not leaving, Badrawi decided to resign the following day, 11 February.

=== After the Revolution ===
After the revolution, Badrawi focused on domestic politics. He played an important role in the formation of Misr AlNahda Party (Egypt Renaissance). He also joined intellectuals and businessmen to start the Ittihad (Union) Party. Those two parties are thought to be aiming for economic and political liberalization. He had a strict political position against the rule of Mosley Brotherhoods, and appeared in many TV interviews to announce his position. Badrawi kept actively his social non profit commitments via 4 major organizations he founded over years : Takatof, an NGO, building schools for the poor. He deliver a school every 7 months to the govenement. ENCC, (Egyptian National Competitive Council), Education First Foundation, for teacher training and Dreamers of Tomorrow Foundation, a youth organization for human development. All organization are part of the family Badrawi Foundation for Education & Development. Badrawi published the second & third editions of his book " Education, is the only chance for reform " التعليم الفرصة للإنقاذ. He also published a book ‘ the man of the storm" رحل العاصفة ، and a book about his conversations with the youth about enlightenment ‘ علي مقهي الحالمون بالغد.. He published since 2011, 156 articles in the newspapers in politics, social 7 economic affairs, and enlightenment.
