= Jane Naana Opoku-Agyemang =

Vice President of Ghana since 2025

Jane Naana Opoku-Agyemang FGA
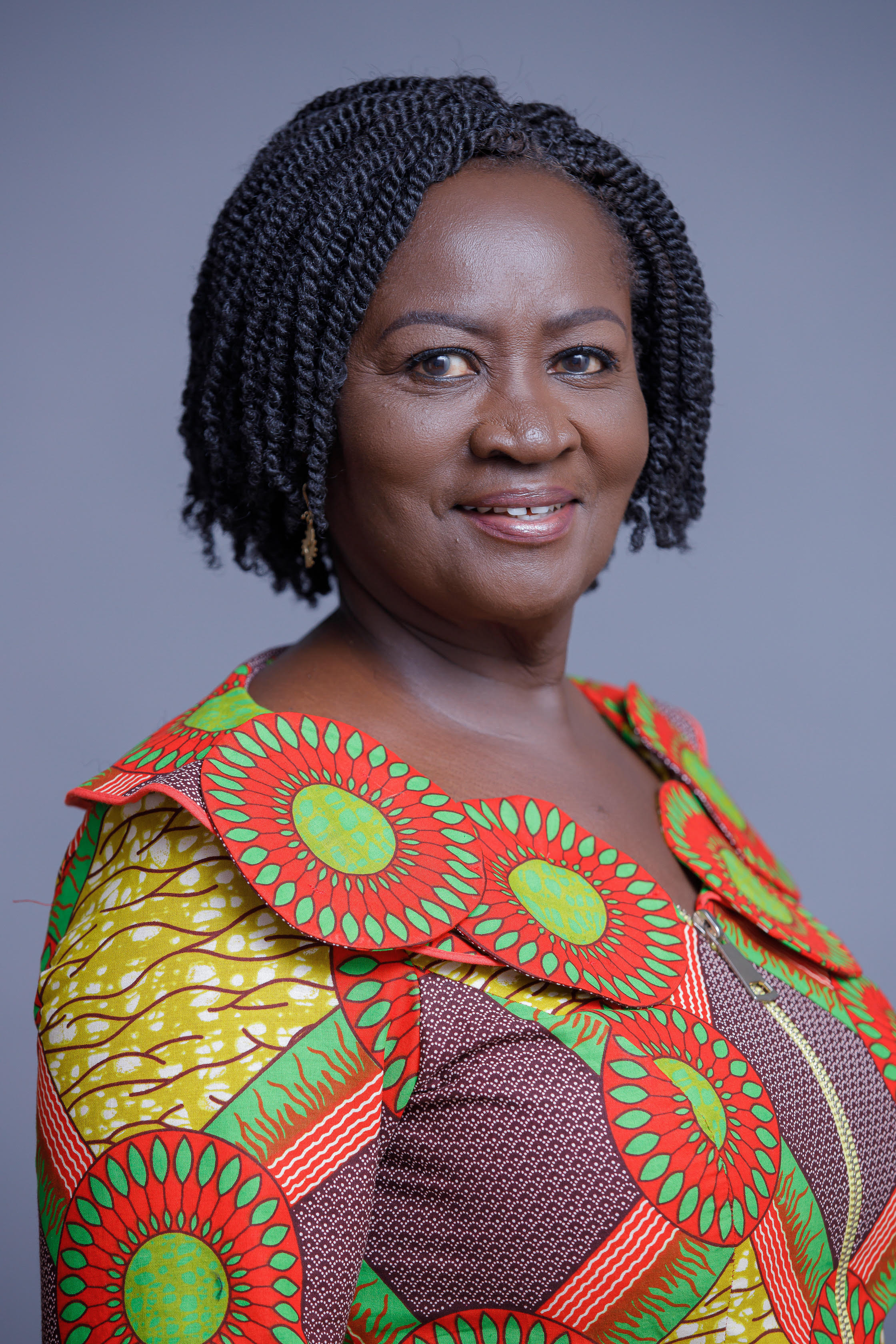
- Official portrait, 2020

8th Vice President of Ghana
- Incumbent
- Assumed office 7 January 2025
- President: John Mahama
- Preceded by: Mahamudu Bawumia

Minister for Education
- In office February 2013 – January 2017
- President: John Mahama
- Preceded by: Lee Ocran
- Succeeded by: Matthew Opoku Prempeh

Vice-Chancellor of the University of Cape Coast
- In office 2008–2012
- Preceded by: Emmanuel Addow-Obeng

Personal details
- Born: Jane Naana Sam; 22 November 1951 (age 74) Cape Coast, Ghana
- Party: National Democratic Congress
- Spouse: Edmund Opoku-Agyemang
- Children: 3
- Education: Wesley Girls' Senior High School University of Cape Coast (B.Ed. (Hons); York University (MA, Ph.D.)
- Occupation: Academic
- Profession: Educationist, educator

Naana Jane Opoku-Agyemang FGA (née Sam; born 22 November 1951) is a Ghanaian academic and politician who currently serves as the eighth vice president of Ghana under President John Mahama since 7 January 2025. She previously served as Minister for Education from February 2013 to January 2017 under President Mahama's first administration. She is a professor of literature, and served as the first female Vice-Chancellor of a state university in Ghana when she took over as Vice-Chancellor of the University of Cape Coast. She served as the Chancellor of the Women's University in Africa in Zimbabwe from 2018 until her resignation in August 2024.

In the 2020 Ghanaian general election, Opoku-Agyemang was selected by John Mahama as his running mate on the National Democratic Congress (NDC) political party ticket. She was selected again as running mate to Mahama in 2024 and won, becoming the first female vice president in the history of Ghana.

== Early life and education ==
An ethnic Fante, she was born on 22 November 1951 in Cape Coast, Ghana, as Jane Naana Sam. She attended Anglican Girls' School at Koforidua and Aburi Presby Girls' School. She then had her secondary education at Wesley Girls High School in Cape Coast, from 1964 to 1971. She completed her B.Ed.(Hons) in English and French at the University of Cape Coast in 1977. She earned a Diploma in Advanced Studies in French from the University of Dakar, and obtained her master's and doctorate degrees from York University in Toronto, Ontario, Canada, in 1980 and 1986 respectively.

== Career ==
=== Academic career ===
Opoku-Agyemang taught and worked at the University of Cape Coast, starting in 1986. She has held various academic positions including Head of the Department of English, Dean of the Faculty of Arts, Warden of Adehye Hall, Valco Trust Fund Post-Graduate Hostel, and the Founding Dean of the School of Graduate Studies and Research. From 1997, she has held the position of Academic Director of the School for International Training in the History and Cultures of the African Diaspora. From 2008 to 2012, she was the university's Vice Chancellor. She assumed duty on 1 October 2008, succeeding Emmanuel Addow-Obeng.

In March 2007, Opoku-Agyemang was one of five scholars selected to deliver presentations during the 200th Anniversary of the Abolition of Slavery at the United Nations Headquarters in New York City.

In October 2009, she was elected Ghana's representative to the executive board of the United Nations Educational, Scientific and Cultural Organization (UNESCO).

Ahead of the 2012 general elections, Opoku-Agyemang moderated the debate with Kojo Oppong Nkrumah.

On 26 October 2018, she became Chancellor of the Women's University in Africa located in Zimbabwe.

She has served on many local and international boards and committees such as the Centre for Democratic Governance, (CDD-Ghana), the editorial board of the Harriet Tubman Series on the African Diaspora (Africa World Press Inc. USA), the Africa Initiative in Canada, and the College of Physicians and Surgeons as an Eminent Citizen.

=== Author ===
Prof. Opoku- Agyemang is an author. Her focus areas include Literature with a keen interest on Women from Ghana, Oral literature in Ghana and Africa, and Communication Skills and Issues in the African Diaspora. As an academic, she has written and published in scholarly journals and presented articles at various conferences including at the 200th Anniversary of the Abolition of Slavery at the United Nations Headquarters in New York City and at the Inaugural Lecture to the Ghana Academy of Arts and Sciences.

In 2015, as Education Minister, she published and launched a five-volume collection of published folktales titled "Who Told the most incredible story?"

== Politics ==
=== Minister for Education ===
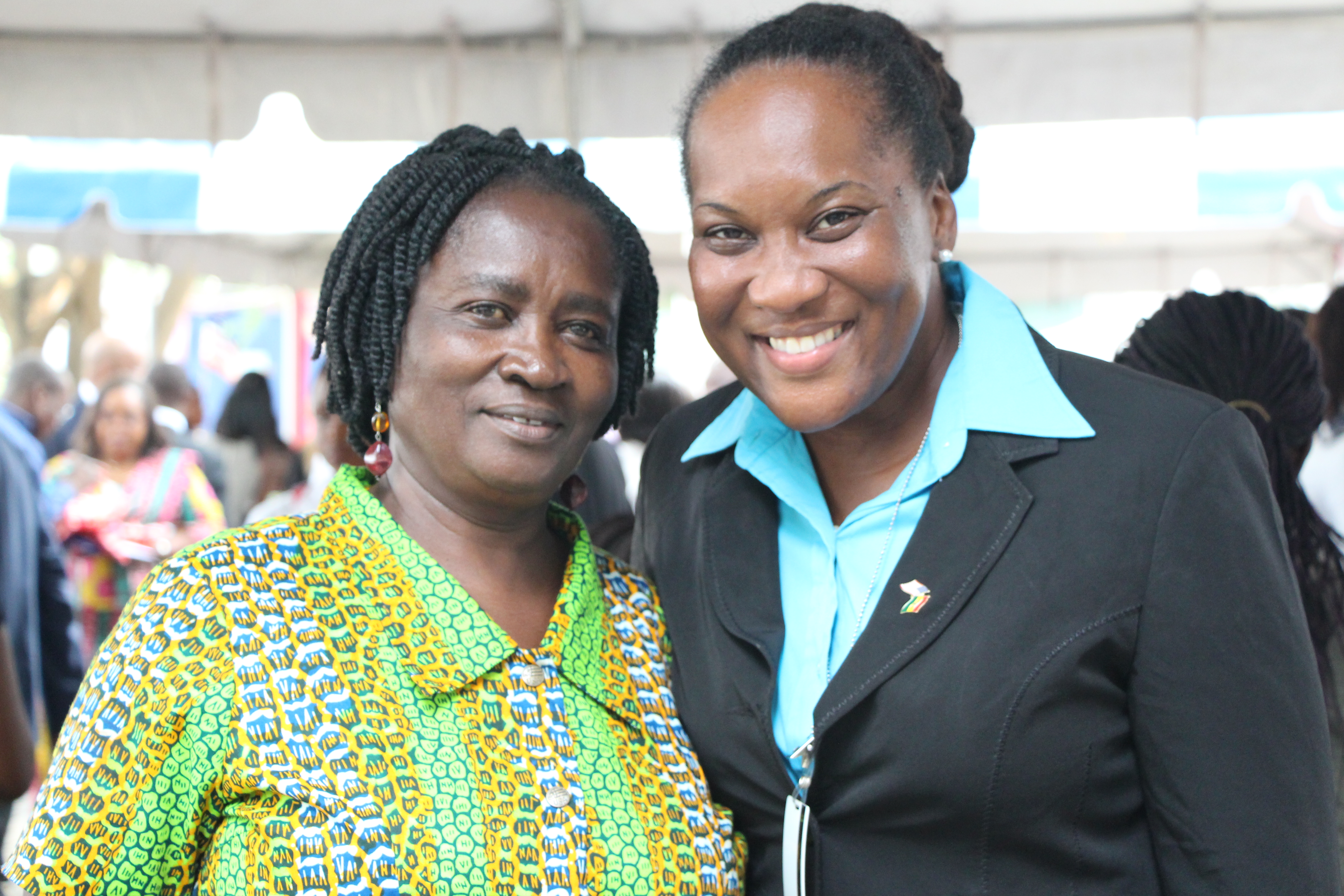
Opoku-Agyemang as Minister of Education in 2013

Between February 2013 and January 2017, she served as the Minister of Education after she was appointed by President John Mahama to serve in that role after the National Democratic Congress had won the 2012 Ghanaian general election.

During her tenure, she spearheaded several transformative reforms aimed at improving the quality, inclusivity, and accessibility of education across the country. One of her significant achievements was the introduction of the Inclusive Education Policy in 2015. This landmark policy aimed to ensure that children with special needs could access quality education alongside their peers, promoting equal opportunities and inclusivity in Ghana’s education system.

A key focus area during her tenure was empowering girls and advocating for gender equity in education. Her leadership drove the implementation of policies that tackled gender disparities, promoted higher female enrolment and retention rates, and empowered girls through education. Her initiatives played a pivotal role in creating more inclusive opportunities for young women across Ghana.

Additionally, she led the conversion of 10 polytechnics across the regions into technical universities, a bold initiative that elevated the status of these institutions, broadening their academic scope and enhancing vocational education. This reform was instrumental in aligning Ghana’s educational framework with global trends, equipping students with practical skills for a competitive job market.

During her tenure, Opoku-Agyemang initiated the construction of 124 Community Day Senior High Schools, known as "E-Blocks," to improve access to secondary education in underserved areas. By the end of her term, 50 schools were completed and operational, providing modern facilities such as science laboratories, libraries, and ICT centres. This initiative significantly expanded educational opportunities, particularly in rural and peri-urban communities, and underscored her commitment to addressing disparities in access to quality education.

Opoku-Agyemang oversaw the completion of key infrastructure at the University of Health and Allied Sciences (UHAS) in Ho, including the School of Basic and Biomedical Sciences, a hostel block, and staff accommodation at its Sokode campus. The university was inaugurated by President John Dramani Mahama in November 2015, underscoring the government's commitment to expanding access to quality higher education and supporting the training of health professionals to address national healthcare needs.

She also played a critical role in establishing the University of Environment and Sustainable Development (UESD) in the Eastern Region of Ghana. She facilitated the passage of the enabling Bill in Parliament and secured funding for the university. In December 2016, President John Mahama officially cut the sod for the construction of the UESD Somanya campus.

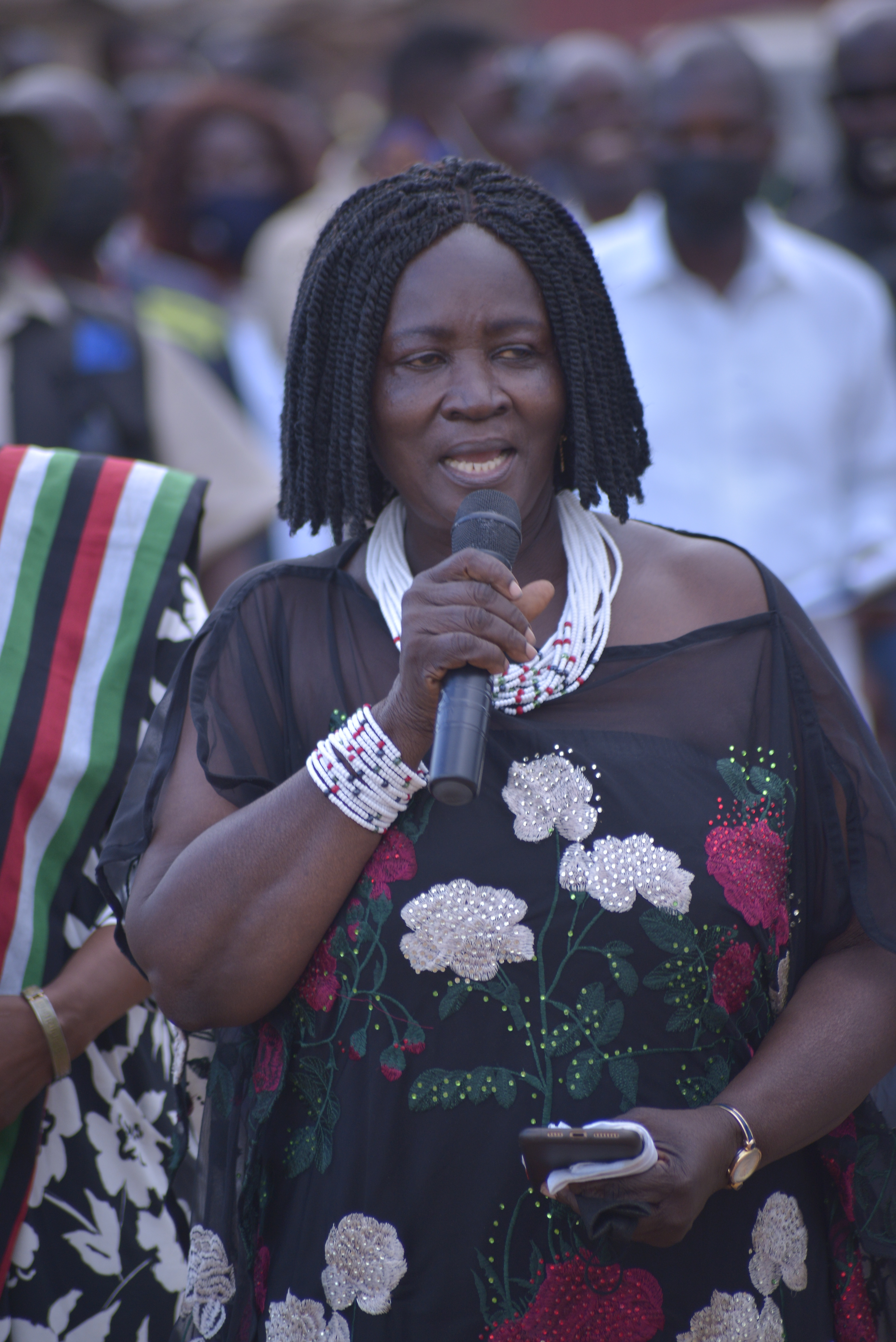
Opoku-Agyemang campaigning in 2021

=== Vice presidential campaign ===
Opoku-Agyemang was selected as the presidential running mate for the National Democratic Congress (NDC) on 6 July 2020 for the December 2020 General elections. She became the first female running mate of the two major political parties in Ghana. Her selection by the flagbearer, John Mahama was applauded by women groups and women activists as a positive sign to the Ghanaian political scene to promote gender balance and equality.

She appealed to Ghanaians to vote for change and promised to use her office as vice president to influence sustainable development and practical youth-centred policies. Her campaign message was devoid of attacks on opponents. Her intensive campaign in the coastal communities and her home region, the Central Region yielded results as the NDC won most of the constituencies they had lost in 2016. The NDC also won 9 out of the 16 regions in Ghana including the major battleground, Greater Accra.

The NDC National Executive Committee, on 7 March 2024, officially endorsed Opoku-Agyemang again as the running mate for the party's flagbearer, ahead of the 2024 general elections.

Opoku-Agyemang became the vice president-elect after Mahama won the 2024 presidential election.

On 7 January 2025, Opoku-Agyemang was sworn in as the Vice President of Ghana, becoming the first female to hold the office. The ceremony took place at Independence Square in Accra, where she took the Oath of Allegiance and the Vice President's Oath before Chief Justice Gertrude Torkornoo. Her appointment marked a significant moment in Ghana's political history, as she became the first woman to assume the role of Vice President in the country's history.

== Professional association ==
Opoku-Agyemang is a Fellow of the Ghana Academy of Arts and Sciences, University Teachers Association of Ghana, English Studies Association, African Studies Association, African Literature Association, and International Fulbright Scholars Association, Commonwealth of Learning amongst others.

== Personal life ==
Opoku Agyemang is a Christian who worships as a Methodist.

She was married to fellow academic, Edmund Opoku-Agyemang and together they have three children, Kweku Opoku-Agyemang, Kwabena Opoku-Agyemang and Maame Adwoa Opoku-Agyemang. She also has two grandchildren.

== Awards and recognition ==
Opoku-Agyemang has been honoured with honorary degrees from the University of the West Indies and Winston-Salem University. She has also received an award for Global leadership from the University of South Florida in Tampa. She received the Officer of the Order of the Volta award for Academic Distinction in 2011 by President John Atta Mills. and Ghana Women of Excellence Award in the Education category due to her contribution to the development and promotion of quality education in Ghana. She was acknowledged for Outstanding Performance in Advancing International Education, School for International Training, Vermont, USA on two occasions.

In 2020, she was named among the 40 Most Inspirational Female Leaders in Ghana for serving as a role model for women in Ghana and in Africa In January 2023, she was listed among the 100 most reputable Africans.

== Bibliography ==
- "Where there is No Silence: Articulations of Resistance to Enslavement". Revised Inaugural Lecture to the Ghana Academy of Arts and Sciences.
- Opoku-Agyemang, N. J., Lovejoy, P. E., Trotman, D. V. (eds), Africa and its Diasporas: History, Memory and Literary Manifestations, Trenton, New Jersey, USA: Africa World Press, 2008.
- Where There is No Silence: Articulations of Resistance to Enslavement, Accra: Page Link Publishers, 2008.
- Anquandah, J., Opoku-Agyemang, N.J., and Doormont, M. (eds), The Trans-Atlantic Slave Trade: Landmarks, Legacies, Expectations, Accra: Sub-Saharan Publishers, 2007, pp. 210–224.
- "The Living Experience of the Slave Trade in Sankana and Gwollu: Literary Manifestations and Implications for Tourism". In James Anquandah, Naana Opoku-Agyemang and Michel Doormont (eds), The Trans-Atlantic Slave Trade: Landmarks, Legacies, Expectations, Accra: Sub-Saharan Publishers, 2007, pp.
- "A Fork in the Road: Ayi Kwei Armah's Osiris Rising and Florence Ladd's Sarah's Psalm on the subject of homecoming" in Naana J. Opoku-Agyemang, with Paul E. Lovejoy and David V. Trotman (eds), Africa and its Diasporas: History, Memory and Literary Manifestations, Trenton, New Jersey, USA: Africa World Press, 2008, pp. 303–318.

Political offices
Preceded by Lee Ocran	Minister for Education; 2013–2017	Succeeded by Matthew Opoku Prempeh
Preceded by Mahamudu Bawumia	Vice President of Ghana; 2025–present	Incumbent
Party political offices
Preceded by Kwesi Amissah-Arthur	National Democratic Congress nominee for Vice President of Ghana; 2020, 2024	Most recent
