= Ghanaian Arabs =

Ghanaian citizens of Arab origin

غانيون عرب
- (Arab League) (Ghana)

Total population
- 34,000 (Middle East nationals only, unknown number of descendants).

Regions with significant populations
- Mainly urban areas: Accra, Tamale and Kumasi.

Languages
- Ghanaian English, French, Arabic, Akan and other Languages of Ghana.

Religion
- Islam and Christianity mainly Maronite Church.

Related ethnic groups
- Ghanaians; other Arabs; Afro-Arabs; Lebanese

Ghanaian Arabs (French: Arabes ghanéens; Akan: Nkɔmbɔtwetwe Arabia Gaana; Dagbani: Gana laribaawanima; Arabic: غانيون عرب) are Ghanaians and citizens of Arab origin or descent. Ghanaian Arabs are mainly from Lebanon, Syria and Arab Maghreb. Ghana has the largest Arab population in western Africa.

== Distribution ==
The vast majority of Arabs live in major cities and towns in south central, south eastern, south western or southern Ghana. Coastal cities such as Accra, Cape Coast, Sekondi-Takoradi, and Tema also have Arab populations. Apart from Accra and Kumasi, Coastal Areas and Southern Ghana, there are Arab communities in Koforidua and Sunyani.

== Background ==
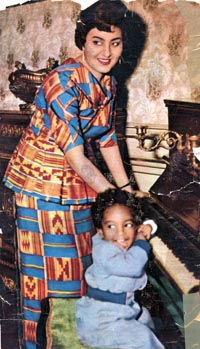
The First Lady of Ghana, Fathia Nkrumah with son Gamal Nkrumah the international affairs editor of Al Ahram Weekly newspaper of Egypt.

Arabs have been present in Ghana for millennia, mostly as merchants in the 15th century, then into the 21st century as business people, and due to this intermarriage has occurred with also the production offsprings of Afro-Arabs; Fathia Nkrumah is a notable Arab with ties to Ghana. She was the late wife of Ghana's first president and revolutionist Kwame Nkrumah, whose marriage was seen as helping plant the seeds of cooperation between Egypt and other African countries as they struggled for independence from European colonization. This helped advance the formation of the African Union. Arabs who have lived in Ghana for most of their lives have acquired Ghanaian citizenship.

== Economics ==
Mostly Lebanese business people or Syrians own businesses, such as restaurants, hotel chains, import and export companies. Historically Arab merchants have been operating in Ghana and across Sub-Saharan Africa for millennia.

== See also ==
- Arab diaspora
- Demographics of Ghana
