= Angelina Nana Akua Oduro =

Ghanaian model

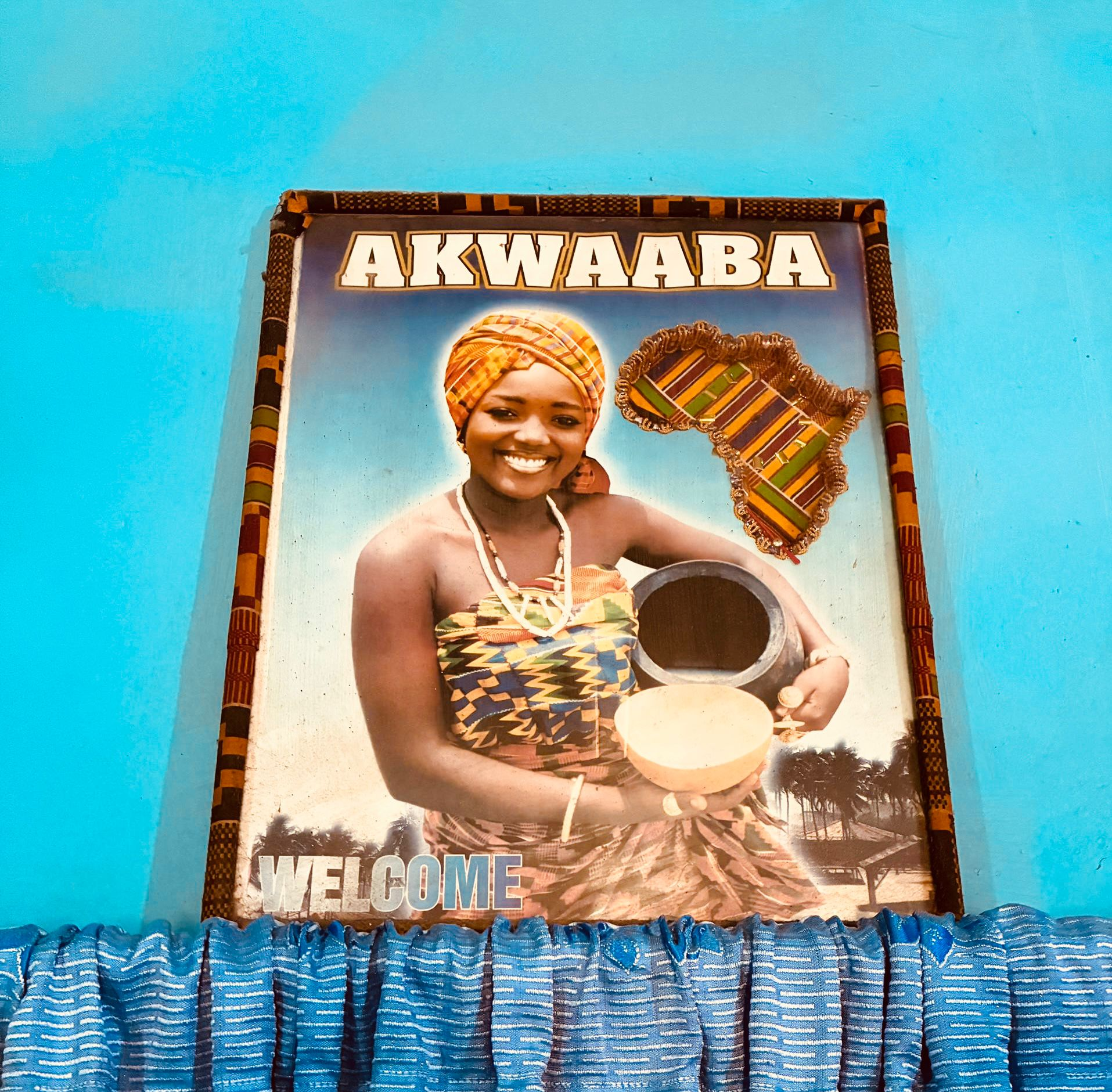
The Akwaaba portrait (featuring Angelina Nana Akua Oduro) displayed in a living room in Ghana

Angelina Nana Akua Oduro is a Ghanaian woman widely recognized as the original model in the iconic “Akwaaba – Welcome” portrait, an image that became a prominent symbol of Ghanaian hospitality both locally and internationally. The photograph, taken in 1999, features Oduro dressed in traditional Ghanaian attire and holding a pot and calabash, signifying warmth and welcome. The photograph achieved national recognition over time and was prominently exhibited in private residences, governmental buildings, and Ghanaian embassies worldwide. Subsequently, it was installed at major national landmarks such as the National Theatre and the Kwame Nkrumah Memorial Park.

== Background and the Akwaaba Portrait ==
In 1999, Oduro served as the subject for a cultural portrait designed and created by Joe Osae of Ceejay Multimedia. The finished framed work, titled "Akwaaba – Welcome," shows her dressed in kente cloth and adorned with traditional beads, smiling while holding a pot and calabash, objects that are emblematic of Ghanaian hospitality.

== The story behind Oduro's photograph ==
Between the ages of 16 and 18, Angelina Nana Akua Oduro met photographer Joseph Osae. During their meeting, Oduro described a vision she had cherished since childhood, an image depicting a woman extending a calabash in a gesture of welcome. Osae agreed to collaborate with Oduro in recreating this image. Oduro financed the photo session herself. The concept, pose, and symbolism were drawn from the painting that had inspired her as a child. She intended for the photograph to be framed and displayed in her home as a fulfillment of her own promise and not for commercial use. After the photographs were taken, Osae informed Oduro that the image was well received. Unknown to Oduro at the time, the photograph entered commercial circulation. She stated that she was not aware of the photograph's commercial use for many years.

Without her knowledge, the image was reproduced, framed, and distributed extensively. Over time, it became widely recognized as the Akwaaba image, symbolizing welcome, warmth, and Ghanaian identity. Despite the photograph's widespread use and cultural impact, Oduro stated that she was never formally notified, credited, or consulted regarding its commercial distribution. She hopes to be recognized for her work one day and hopes that young women and girls in the creative industry get recognized for their work.
