= Jomoro =

Jomoro may refer to:

- Jomoro (Ghana parliament constituency), a parliament constituency in Ghana
- Jomoro Municipal District, a local government district in Ghana
- Jomoro, a musical duo composed of Joey Waronker and Mauro Refosco
