= Egypt Revival Party =

Egyptian political party

Egypt Revival Party Hizb Masr al-Nahda
- Leader: Hossam Badrawi

The Egypt Revival Party was an Egyptian political party made up of former members of the NDP. The party was superseded by the Union Party, which was officially approved in September 2011.
