= Chinese people in Senegal =

Total population
- 200-2,000? (c. 2008)

Regions with significant populations
- Dakar

Languages
- Chinese · Wolof · French

Related ethnic groups
- Overseas Chinese

There is a small but growing population of Chinese people in Senegal, largely consisting of expatriates from the People's Republic of China who began arriving in the country in the 1980s.

== Migration history ==
Migrants from the People's Republic of China (PRC) began flowing into Senegal in the 1980s. They rented properties at above-market rates in the Centenaire area, and remained in the country even after Senegalese president Abdou Diouf's administration granted official recognition to the Republic of China (ROC) on Taiwan in 1996. The ROC's diplomatic success was not matched by the development of economic relations; instead, the traders from the PRC, actually on the ground in Senegal, were able to cultivate political and popular support. Their efforts paid off in October 2005, when Senegal broke off relations with the ROC and restored its relations with the PRC, an event which was greeted with celebrations by local Chinese migrants. The ROC responded by accusing the PRC of "buying" Senegal's allegiance by pledging US$600 million in foreign aid.

In 2004, the PRC's official People's Daily published an estimate of 300 Chinese in Senegal. In 2008, the South China Morning Post published official numbers from an unspecified source stating that 150 Chinese families totalling 200 to 300 people lived in Dakar alone, but Chinese in Senegal who were interviewed estimated the true number might be as high as 1,000. Another report by Radio Australia's Chinese edition in January 2009 put the total number at 2,000.

== Business and employment ==
As of 2009, there were roughly 200 Chinese-owned shops in Dakar, largely concentrated around Dakar's Boulevard du Centenaire. The area is rapidly becoming known as the local "Chinatown", though it still lacks some of the visual features associated with Chinatowns in other countries, such as Chinese lanterns. Chinese merchants typically convert their buildings into shophouses, with living space in the back and retail space in the front. According to a Voice of America report, Chinese wholesalers can gross several thousand dollars per day. Their influence has largely shifted the centre of commerce in Dakar away from the historic Sandaga market to the Centenaire area.

Chinese merchants largely sell imported goods; in 2006, imports from China to Senegal accounted for 94% of the two countries' total trade relationship. Larger Senegalese traders who compete with the Chinese shops them often blame them for flooding the market with cheap goods, and even organised a strike in 2004 through their business association UNACOIS (a French acronym for "Senegalese Union of Traders and Industrialists") to demand caps on Chinese immigration. In particular, they accuse Chinese merchants of paying bribes and evading taxes. However, the low prices they offer benefit both consumers as well as small itinerant vendors who go door-to-door in poor neighbourhoods reselling goods they purchase from the Chinese. The head of Senegalese consumer association ASCOSEN even organised a counter-protest in opposition to UNACOIS's 2004 protest, in turn accusing them of cheating consumers by selling goods imported from China at prices up to ten times as much as those offered by Chinese traders. Others credit Chinese traders with creating jobs for locals. Each shop employs about two or three local assistants, and one local observer noted that they have decreased crime, as "young kids who used to be pickpockets are now hired as messengers".

As a result of the low prices they offer, Chinese traders have not only been able to outcompete large Senegalese merchants in Dakar, but have also begun to displace diasporic Lebanese from their traditional position as the market-dominant minority there as well; members of those two groups have begun to shift to a business pattern of buying goods from the Chinese and reselling them in more remote areas of the country where no Chinese migrants live. Chinese wholesalers also attract merchants from nearby West African countries, especially Gambia, Guinea-Bissau, and Mali, who find it cheaper to come to Senegal to purchase Chinese goods for resale in their home countries, rather than go through the expensive and time-consuming process of obtaining a PRC visa and flying to China themselves.

== Integration and community ==
Chinese shop-owners often teach their African employees Mandarin and learn Wolof and French from them in return, a form of language exchange. However, they have little contact with local people outside of work, instead mostly socialising with and living near other Chinese people. They are perceived by local people as a secretive community.

Chinese in Senegal have formed a variety of community associations, including:

- The Senegalese Association of Overseas Chinese, established in Dakar in October 2007.
- The Chinese Association of Senegal (塞内加尔华人联谊会), headed by Li Jicai (李吉才)
- The Association of Chinese Businessmen in Senegal
- The Senegal Chinese Friendship Association (塞内加尔中国人联谊会)

Chinese traders in Senegal often become the victims of violent crime. In 2002, a woman went missing and was never heard from again; in 2004, Sun Fengzhi and her son Wang Kun were murdered in their home in Dakar. In February 2009, after the murder of businessman Zhao Suiqin (赵遂勤) from Henan, 214 Chinese-owned shops held a work stoppage to protest the slow police investigations of violence against them; some Senegalese merchants also closed their shops in solidarity.
