= Paul Essien =

Ghanaian politician

Member of the Ghana Parliament for Jomoro Constituency
- Incumbent
- Assumed office 7 January 2017
- Preceded by: Francis Kabenlah Anaman

Personal details
- Born: 8 July 1975 (age 50)
- Party: New Patriotic Party

Paul Essien is a Ghanaian politician and member of the Seventh Parliament of the Fourth Republic of Ghana representing the Jomoro Constituency in the Western Region on the ticket of the New Patriotic Party.

== Education ==
He attended Nass Senior High School for his Ordinary level certificate and for his Advanced Level he moved to Nsein Senior High School. He also has a Bachelor Science degree in Statistics from the University of Cape Coast. Prior to that Essien, had obtained a Higher National Diploma (HND) from Takoradi polytechnic now Takoradi Technical University. He did his mandatory national service at GRA (VAT) from 2007 to 2008.

== Career ==
Essien is a teacher by profession. He taught as a mathematics teacher whilst serving as a form master and sports teacher at Annor Adjaye Senior High School from 2008 to 2016. He was the District Sports Chairman from 1998 to 2003.

== Politics ==
Essien is a member of the New Patriotic Party. He is a member of the 7th parliament of the 4th Republic of Ghana representing the Jomoro Constituency. He won the bid to represent the constituency after winning in the 2016 parliamentary and presidential elections. He won in a fiercely contested election against most notably Thomas Elleamo Yankey of the National Democratic Congress and Samia Yaaba Christina Nkrumah of the Convention People's Party who is a former member of parliament (2009-2013) and happens to be the daughter of Ghana's first president Kwame Nkrumah. He won after obtaining 18,694 votes representing 39.49%, whilst Thomas Yankey and Samia Nkrumah had 14,241 votes representing 30.08% and 9,714 votes representing 20.52% respectively.

Essien serves on the Trade, Industry and Tourism Committee and the Judiciary Committee in the 7th parliament.
