= Lee Ocran =

Ghanaian politician (1945–2019)

Hon Lee Ocran

Member of the Ghana Parliament for Jomoro
- In office January 2005 – January 2009
- Preceded by: Joseph Emmanuel Ackah
- Succeeded by: Samia Nkrumah
- Majority: 1,665

Ghanaian High Commissioner to South Africa
- In office November 2009 – February 2012
- Preceded by: Jimmy Ben Heymann
- Succeeded by: Martha Ama Akyaa Pobee

Minister for Education
- In office February 2012 – February 2013
- President: John Atta Mills
- Preceded by: Betty Mould-Iddrisu
- Succeeded by: Jane Naana Opoku-Agyemang

Personal details
- Born: c. 1945 Nawule, Jomoro District, Ghana
- Died: 21 February 2019 (aged 73–74) Accra, Ghana
- Party: National Democratic Congress

Lee Tandoh Ocran (born about 1945; died 21 February 2019) was a Ghanaian politician who served as Minister for Education of Ghana from 2012 to 2013. Ocran was appointed Minister by President John Atta Mills in February 2012 in a cabinet reshuffle following the resignation of Betty Mould-Iddrisu from the government and the sacking of Martin Amidu.

== Career ==
In 2000 he was Deputy Minister of Environment Science and Technology. He was the former Minister for Education from 2012 to 2013. He was sworn in as a board chairman of VRA in February 2014. He was also the former High Commissioner of Ghana to South Africa.

== Early life ==
Since January 2005 as candidate from the National Democratic Congress he was Member of Parliament for the Jomoro constituency until he lost his seat to the daughter of Kwame Nkrumah, Samia Nkrumah of the Convention People's Party in the December 2008 parliamentary election. In February 2014 Ocran was sworn in as board chairman of Volta River Authority. On 13 May 2015 he described the Bui Dam as a White Elephant (extravagant but burdensome gift).

== Personal life ==
He was a Christian and worshiped as a Catholic. He was married with three children.

== Death ==
He died at the age of 74 after battling with illnesses.

== See also ==
- List of Mills government ministers
- Jomoro constituency

Parliament of Ghana
Preceded by Joseph Emmanuel Ackah	Jomoro; 2005 –2009	Succeeded by Samia Nkrumah
Political offices
Preceded by Betty Mould-Iddrisu	Minister for Education; 2012 - 2013	Succeeded by Jane Naana Opoku-Agyemang
