= Khalifa Jassim Al-Kuwari =

Qatari accountant and banker (born 1977)

- Born: January 10, 1977 (age 49)
- Occupations: Accountant, banker

Khalifa Jassim Al-Kuwari (Arabic: خليفة جاسم الكواري; born on 10 January 1977) is a Qatari accountant and banker. He has held executive positions in Volkswagen and Qatar Investment Authority. He holds a master's degree in accounting from Cleveland State University. He was the chief operating officer of Qatar Investment Authority and its subsidiary, Qatar Holding, until December 2012.

== Career ==
In 2010, he was appointed to the board of directors of Songbird Estates. He stepped down in September 2014 and was replaced by Ken Costa.

He was appointed as chairman of Islamic Bank Britain, later to be known as Al Rayan Bank, in 2011. The same year, he was appointed as a member of Volkswagen's supervisory board. He resigned from the board in April 2013.

Al-Kuwari is the general manager of the Qatar Fund for Development (QVN). In April 2015, he signed an agreement with Saeb Erekat to consolidate a $100 million QVN-financed loan to the Palestinian Authority.
