= Jimmy Ben Heymann =

Ghanaian diplomat

Ghanaian High Commissioner to Republic of South Africa
- In office 2006–2009
- Succeeded by: Lee Ocran

Board Chairman of SIC Insurance
- Incumbent
- Assumed office 2017

Personal details
- Occupation: Board Chairman
- Profession: Medical Doctor

Jimmy Ben Heymann is a former Ghanaian diplomat and the chairman of the Board of Directors of SIC Insurance.

== Early life and education ==
Heymann is an alumnus of the Adisadel College and completed in 1973. He further went to the Alliance Francaise d’Accra and the University of Ghana Medical School.

== Career ==
Heymann began his career in 1989 as a Medical Doctor.

He is also the board chairman of the SIC Insurance PLC, a general insurance company in Ghana since 2017. He is also a board member of Playsoccer Ghana, Global Railway (Ghana) Ltd, Corricreche, Crimson School in Akosombo and Aggrey Memorial A.M.E Zion Secondary School.

He is also on the board of Cenpower Generation Company Limited.

== Ambassadorial roles ==
From 2006 to 2009, Heymann was the High Commissioner of Ghana to the Republic of South Africa. In January 2006, he replaced Ellen Nee-Whang as the High Commissioner of Ghana to South Africa. He is also a former Consul of Ghana for Lesotho from 2006 to 2009.
