= John Saad =

John Nicol Sahid Saad (born in Bo, Sierra Leone) is a Sierra Leonean politician, who currently serves as Sierra Leone's Minister of Housing and Infrastructural Development. He is a member of the opposition People's Movement for Democratic Change (PMDC). He is one of only few members from the opposition parties to be elected as a minister in the current government. Saad was the Chairman of the Sierra Leone People's Party (SLPP) in London, United Kingdom for over ten years, but he resigned from the SLPP in 2006 to join the PMDC. He was born in Bo to a Mende mother from Segbwema, Kailahun District and a Sierra Leonean-Lebanese father. He is only the second Sierra Leonean-Lebanese person to be elected to one of the top ministerial positions in the national government of Sierra Leone.
