= Qatar Fund for Development =

Government entity for foreign aid

Qatar Fund for Development (QFFD)
- صندوق قطر للتنمية

Agency overview
- Jurisdiction: Qatar
- Headquarters: Doha (Qatar)
- Agency executives: Mohammed bin Abdulrahman bin Jassim Al Thani, Chairman; Sultan Al Aseeri, Acting Director General
- Website: www.qatarfund.org.qa

The Qatar Fund for Development (acronym: QFFD, Arabic: صندوق قطر للتنمية) is a government entity in the State of Qatar, which is responsible for Qatar's international development and foreign aid; it was established by Law 19 of 2002. The QFFD also coordinates with the country's charitable and development institutions to implement Qatari foreign policy and aid strategy.

According to the OECD, Qatar provided US$820 million in official development assistance in 2022, representing 0.46% of GNI.

== Administration ==
Qatar Fund for Development is headed by its director-general Khalifa Jassim Al-Kuwari, and its chairman Mohammed bin Abdulrahman bin Jassim Al Thani.

== Charity and aid programs ==
In May 2017, the QFFD met with UNESCO to discuss the UNESCO Heritage Emergency Fund.

In 2015, Qatar pledged to help Rohingya refugees in Malaysia using money from the QFFD.

On 18 November 2022, the Office of the Special Representative of the Secretary-General for Children and Armed Conflict (OSRSG CAAC) collaborated with QFFD in planning the Youth Festival of Generation Awesome. The joint goal was to enhance the protection of children and increase awareness of children impacted by armed conflict.

On 28 March 2023, a financial agreement was signed the United States Agency for International Development (USAID) to support Syria Civil Defense ("White Helmets") core activities and finance life-saving services in northwest Syria. The White Helmets deploy volunteer field teams, purchase search and rescue equipment, and provide medical supplies. When a series of earthquakes hit Syria and Turkey the White Helmets took immediate action.

On 9 May 2023, Qatar Fund for Development signed an agreement with WHO to provide medical services to Afghanistan. According to WHO, the two organizations will operate healthcare facilities and offer medicine for primary health care. They will treat diseases that affect maternal, neonatal, and child mortality as well as sexual and reproductive health.
