= Samir Hassaniyeh =

Sierra Leonean activist

Samir Hassanyeh (born in Kenema, Sierra Leone) is a Sierra Leonean civil right activist.

== Biography ==
He is currently the chairman and president of the Sierra Leonean-Lebanese community in Sierra Leone. Samir Hassanyeh has spent most of his adult life fighting the Lebanese in Sierra Leone. He is currently the chairman of the Marine and General Insurance Company. He is also the C.E.O of Mercury International. He was reelected president of the Lebanese Community of Sierra Leone in 2020.

== Personal life ==
He married in 1966 and divorced in 1978. He then later remarried in 2012. He currently lives in Freetown, Sierra Leone.
