= Nahim Khadi =

Sierra Leonean footballer (1948–2023)

Nahim Khadi (1948 – 13 June 2023) was a Sierra Leonean footballer and president of the Sierra Leone Football Association.

== Life ==
Khadi was born to in Freetown Sierra Leonean-Lebanese parents. He played for the Sierra Leone national team] during the 1960s and 1970s and also turned out for five local clubs including the country's two biggest and most popular clubs, East End Lions and Mighty Blackpool. Khadi is also one of the first Sierra Leonean people of full Lebanese origin to represent Sierra Leone at any sport.

Khadi was elected president of the Sierra Leone Football Association in 2004, after defeating his closest rival, Joseph Samba Kelfala during the 2004 election. On 20 July 2008, he was re-elected as president of the Sierra Leone Football Association. He resigned from the position in 2012.

His son is international player Nahim Khadi, Jr.

Khadi died on 13 June 2023 in London, at the age of 75.
