= Kassim Basma =

Sierra Leonean businessman

- Born: 1960; Koidu, Kono District, Sierra Leone
- Died: 29 December 2018 (aged 58)
- Occupations: Businessman, diamond exporter
- Years active: 1980–2018
- Known for: One of Sierra Leone's leading diamond exporters
- Children: Jihad Basma (son)
- Relatives: Basma family

Kassim Basma (1960 – 29 December 2018) was a Sierra Leonean-Lebanese businessman and diamond trader. Based in Koidu in the diamond-rich Kono District, at his peak he accounted for around 38% of all official diamond exports from Sierra Leone, ranking as the country's second-largest exporter behind Hisham Mackie's H.M Diamond.

== Early life ==
Kassim Basma was born in 1960 in Koidu, the capital of Kono District in eastern Sierra Leone, into a Shi'ite family of Lebanese descent originating from the village of Ain Baal in the Tyre District of southern Lebanon. The Basma family had become one of the five key Lebanese family groupings in Sierra Leone by the 1970s, and had been involved in the country's diamond business since the 1950s. Counterparts of the family in neighbouring Liberia were also diamond traders.

== Career ==
Basma operated his diamond business from an office in Koidu, in the Tankoro Chiefdom of Kono District. He owned a diamond mining company in Kono and exported rough diamonds through the Government Gold and Diamond Office (GGDO) in Freetown.

During the Sierra Leone Civil War (1991–2002), Lebanese diamond dealers, including Basma, continued to operate from Bo, Kenema and Freetown after the Revolutionary United Front (RUF) captured the main Kono and Tongo Field mining areas. Following the introduction of the Kimberley Process Certification Scheme in Sierra Leone in September 2000 and the end of the war in 2002, official diamond exports grew rapidly, and Basma's firm emerged as one of the largest exporters in the country. In 2005, Basma's company was the second-largest exporter of Sierra Leone's diamonds, behind only Hisham Mackie's H.M Diamond, which accounted for over 40 per cent of exports that year; together with two other foreign-owned firms, the two companies handled more than 90 per cent of all official diamond exports.

In June 2004, an Associated Press investigation by journalist Todd Pitman, published by News24 and the Washington Times, reported that U.S. State Department officials in West Africa alleged that the Lebanese Hezbollah movement was extorting contributions from West African Lebanese diamond merchants. Basma, identified by the news agency as "one of Sierra Leone's top diamond exporters", denied any link to the organisation, telling reporters in Koidu: "This is a lie. There's never been any connection between these people and Hezbollah. For me, I couldn't support them. For what? To cause myself problems?" He added of the global diamond trade, in which Lebanese exporters typically sold to Jewish and Israeli cutters in Antwerp and Tel Aviv: "To us, we don't see Christian or Muslim or Jew. We're businessmen."

In March 2017, the 709.48-carat Peace Diamond, the largest diamond found in Sierra Leone since the end of the civil war and the 14th-largest rough diamond ever discovered, was unearthed by Pastor Emmanuel Momoh in Tankoro Chiefdom, Kono District. Momoh handed the stone to Basma's eldest son, Jihad Basma, in Koidu for safekeeping; Kassim Basma, who was in Belgium at the time, flew back to Freetown to confirm to the government that he was willing and able to buy the diamond, as Momoh had insisted he be given the first option to purchase it. The government of President Ernest Bai Koroma subsequently ordered that the stone be kept in the vault of the Bank of Sierra Leone until a buyer could be found, and that any sale go to a Sierra Leone-resident exporter. The diamond was eventually auctioned internationally and sold to British jeweller Laurence Graff for US$6.5 million in New York City in December 2017.
