= Tikobo No. 2 =

Tikobo No.2
- Country: Ghana
- Region: Western Region (Ghana)

Tikobo No.2 is a town in the Western region of Ghana. It is in the Jomoro District. The main occupation of the inhabitants of the town is coconut, rubber and cocoa farming. The town has a sister town called Tikobo No.1.
