= Francis Kabenlah Anaman =

Ghanaian politician

Member of the Ghana Parliament for Jomoro Constituency
- In office 7 January 2013 – 6 January 2017
- Preceded by: Samia Nkrumah
- Succeeded by: Paul Essien

Personal details
- Born: 26 July 1960 (age 66)
- Party: National Democratic Congress
- Education: Kwame Nkrumah University of Science and Technology
- Occupation: Military Officer

Francis Kabenlah Anaman (born 26 July 1960) is a Ghanaian politician and member of the Sixth Parliament of the Fourth Republic of Ghana. He represented the Jomoro Constituency in the Western Region on the ticket of the National Democratic Congress.

== Early life and education ==
Anaman was born on 26 July 1960. He hails from Tikobo, a town in the Western Region of Ghana. He attended the Kwame Nkrumah University of Science and Technology and obtained a bachelor's degree in Economics and Sociology. He earned his postgraduate diploma in Public Administration from the Ghana Institute of Management and Public Administration in 1999.

== Career ==
Anaman was a military officer of the Ghana Armed Forces.

== Politics ==
Anaman is a member of the National Democratic Congress (NDC). In 2012, he contested for the Jomoro seat on the ticket of the NDC in the 2012 Ghanaian General Elections and won. He won against the incumbent member parliament Samia Nkrumah the daughter of Ghana's first president.

== Personal life ==
Anaman is married with three children. He is a Christian.
