= Nahim Khadi Jr. =

Sierra Leonean footballer

Nahim Kadi Jr.
Personal information
- Full name: Nahim Kadi Jr.
- Date of birth: August 16, 1979 (age 47)
- Place of birth: Freetown, Sierra Leone
- Position: Midfielder

Team information
- Current team: Dulwich Hamlet (assistant manager)

Senior career*
| Years | Team | Apps | (Gls) |
- Coventry City
- Crystal Palace
| 1998–1999 | Whyteleafe | | |
| 1999–2001 | Kingstonian | 23 | (1) |
| 2000–2002 | Woking | 28 | (3) |
| 2002 | Slough | | |
| 2002–2003 | Dulwich Hamlet | | |
| 2003–2005 | Lewes | 30+ | (9+) |
| 2005–2006 | Beckenham Town | | |
| 2006–2008 | Bromley | 15 | (4) |
| 2008–2009 | Dartford | | |
| 2009–2010 | Carshalton Athletic | | |
| 2010–2016 | Dulwich Hamlet | 20+ | (4+) |

International career
| 2006–2007 | Sierra Leone | 13 | (0) |
- * Club domestic league appearances and goals

Nahim Khadi Jr. (born 16 August 1979) is a Sierra Leonean former professional footballer who is currently assistant manager at Dulwich Hamlet. He has most notably played for Coventry City and Crystal Palace, before moving down to the lower leagues. He became the first Bromley player to receive full international caps while at the club.

He is the son of Nahim Khadi, a former Sierra Leonean international footballer and the current president of the Sierra Leone Football Association.
