= Victor Gadzekpo =

Ghanaian academic and administrator

Victor Gadzekpo is a Ghanaian academic and administrator. He was the Vice Chancellor of the University of Cape Coast and served as the President of the Central University of Ghana.

He holds a PhD in Analytical Chemistry from the University of Washington, Seattle, USA, from the same university, he earned a Master of Science degree. He was also at the University of Cape Coast where he obtained two degrees, Bachelor of Science degree in Education and Bachelor of Science degree in chemistry.
