= Union Party (Egypt) =

Union Party حزب الاتحاد Hizb al-Ittihad
- Chairperson: Hossam Badrawi
- Founded: September 18, 2011; 14 years ago
- Headquarters: Cairo
- Ideology: Egyptian nationalism
- Political position: Centre
- House of Representatives: 0 / 568

Website
- www.alettihadegypt.org

The Union Party (Arabic: حزب الاتحاد, Hizb al-Ittihad) is an Egyptian political party made up of former members of the National Democratic Party.

== Electoral history ==
=== People's Assembly elections ===
Election	Seats	+/–
2011–12	2 / 596	▲2
