= Tikobo No. 1 =

Tikobo No.2
- Country: Ghana
- Region: Western Region (Ghana)

Tikobo No.1 (or, in short form Tikwabo) is a town in the Western region of Ghana. It is in the Jomoro District. The main occupation of the inhabitants of the town is cocoa farming. The town has a sister town called Tikobo No.2. The town has a market day, which is Thursday.
