= Fathia Nkrumah =

First lady of Ghana and wife of Kwame Nkrumah (1931-2007)

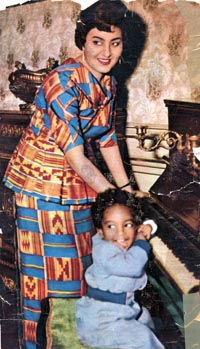
- Fathia Nkrumah with son Gamal

1st First Lady of Ghana
- In role 1957/1958 – 24 February 1966
- Succeeded by: Mildred Christina Akosiwor Fugar

Personal details
- Born: Fathia Halim Rizk; 23 February 1931 Cairo, Kingdom of Egypt
- Died: 31 May 2007 (aged 76) Cairo, Egypt
- Resting place: Kwame Nkrumah Memorial Park; Accra, Ghana
- Party: Convention People's Party
- Spouse: Kwame Nkrumah (m. 1957; died 1972)
- Children: Gamal (born 1958); Samia (born 1960); Sekou (born 1963)
- Profession: Teacher, Bank teller, First Lady
- Religion: Coptic Christian

Helena Ritz Fathia Nkrumah (/ənˈkruːmə/ ən-KROO-mə; 23 February 1931 – 31 May 2007), born Fathia Halim Rizk (Arabic: فتحية حليم رزق), was an Egyptian, and the First Lady of the newly independent Ghana as the wife of Kwame Nkrumah, its first president.

Fathia Nkrumah was born to a Coptic Christian family and brought up in Zeitoun, a district of Cairo. She was the first child of a civil servant who died early; Fathia was raised by her mother single-handedly after her husband's death.

== Early life and career ==
She was born Fathia Halim Rizk in Zeitoun, Cairo, in 1931. Her father worked as a clerk in an Egyptian telephone company and died early, leaving her mother widowed and having to raise Fathia single-handed. She was the eldest of five children in the family.

After completing her secondary education, where she studied French, she worked as a teacher at her school in Zeitoun, Notre Dame des Apôtres. As teaching did not appeal to her, she took a job in a bank.

== Marriage ==
Frederick, an American journalist, who published her book in 1967, said Nkrumah sent his friend, Alhaji Saleh Said Sinare, who was one of the first Ghanaian Muslims to study in Egypt, to find him a Christian wife from Egypt, and Fathia was one of the final five women chosen. At that stage, Kwame Nkrumah proposed to her. Her mother was reluctant to see another of her children marry a foreigner and quit the country, as Fathia's brother had left Egypt with his English wife.

Fathia explained that Nkrumah was an anti-colonial hero, like Gamal Abdel Nasser, yet her mother refused to speak to her or bless the marriage. Nkrumah married Fathia at Christianborg Castle, Accra on the evening of the 1957 New Year's Eve upon her arrival in Ghana.

== Leaving Ghana and later life ==
Fathia Nkrumah was the mother of three young children, who were then aged three to eight years old, when her husband was overthrown in Ghana's first successful military coup d'état on 24 February 1966. She had to take her children to Cairo, to be raised there while her husband went into exile in Guinea. Her children were Gamal Nkrumah (born 1958), Samia Nkrumah (born 1960) and Sékou Nkrumah (born 1963).

Her children have all gone on to have careers relating to politics. Her daughter, Samia Nkrumah, was the chairperson of the Convention People's Party (CPP), the political party that her father founded, from 2011 to 2015.

== Death ==
Fathia died on 31 May 2007 at Badrawy Hospital in Cairo due to a stroke after a period of illness.

Her funeral was held in the Coptic Orthodox Cathedral Church in Cairo by Pope Shenouda III on 1 June 2007. Subsequently, Nkrumah's bodily remains were flown to Ghana for a funeral at the State House and, following her "lifelong request", was buried next to her husband at the Kwame Nkrumah Memorial Park.

== See also ==
- List of Copts
