= Jomoro (Ghana parliament constituency) =

Constituency in Ghana

- constituency for the Parliament of Ghana
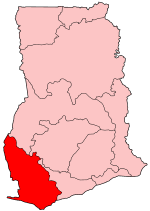
- District: Jomoro District
- Region: Western Region of Ghana

Current constituency
- Party: National Democratic Congress
- MP: Dorcas Affo-Toffey

Jomoro is one of the constituencies represented in the Parliament of Ghana. It elects one Member of Parliament (MP) by the first past the post system of election. Jomoro is located in the Jomoro District of the Western Region of Ghana.

== Boundaries ==
The seat is located within the Jomoro District of the Western Region of Ghana with similar boundaries. To its west is the Côte d'Ivoire. The southern boundary is the Atlantic Ocean. The eastern neighbour is the Nzema East District and to the north are the Aowin/Suaman and the Wasa Amenfi West Districts.

== Members of Parliament ==
Election	Member	Party
1979	James Leuven Mensah	People's National Party
1992	Joseph Emmanuel Ackah	National Democratic Congress
2004	Lee Ocran	National Democratic Congress
2008	Samia Nkrumah	Convention People's Party
2012	Francis Kabenlah Anaman	National Democratic Congress
2016	Paul Essien	New Patriotic Party

== Elections ==
2008 Ghanaian parliamentary election: Jomoro Source:Ghana Home Page
Party	Candidate	Votes	%	±%
Convention People's Party	Samia Yaba Christina Nkrumah	19,916	50.0	+29.0
National Democratic Congress	Lee Ocran	13,345	33.5	−7.0
New Patriotic Party	Martin Nyameke Ackah	6,345	15.9	−20.5
People's National Convention	Jemaima Soboe	220	0.6	−0.8
Majority		6,571	16.5	12.4
Turnout				—

2004 Ghanaian parliamentary election:Jomoro Source:Electoral Commission of Ghana
Party	Candidate	Votes	%	±%
National Democratic Congress	Lee Ocran	16,490	40.5	+7.1
New Patriotic Party	Anthony Ransford Tandoh	14,835	36.4	+17.3
Convention People's Party	Philip Ackatiah Armah	8,567	21.0	+5.7
People's National Convention	Doris Eduku	586	1.4	+0.2
Majority		1,665	4.1	−3.1
Turnout		40,478	73.8	

2000 Ghanaian parliamentary election:Jomoro Source:Adam Carr's Election Archives
Party	Candidate	Votes	%	±%
National Democratic Congress	Joseph Emmanuel Ackah	10,427	33.4	
Independent	Patrick Somiah Ehomah	8,171	26.2	
New Patriotic Party	Peter Nwanwaan	5,959	19.1	
Convention People's Party	Abraham Yankson	4,762	15.3	
National Reform Party	Stephen Blay	1,365	4.4	
People's National Convention	Richard Aduko Raqib	389	1.2	
United Ghana Movement	Patrick Tandoh Williams	131	0.4	
Majority		2,256	7.2	−17.9

1996 Ghanaian parliamentary election: Jomoro Source:Electoral Commission of Ghana
Party	Candidate	Votes	%	±%
National Democratic Congress	Joseph Emmanuel Ackah	22,881	60.7	—
People's Convention Party	Anthony Kwofie Jabialu	13,401	35.6	—
National Convention Party	Patrick Tandoh Williams	1,394	3.7	—
Majority		9,480	25.1	—
Turnout		37,676	53.9	24.2

1992 Ghanaian parliamentary election: Jomoro Source:Electoral Commission of Ghana
Party	Candidate	Votes	%	±%
National Democratic Congress	Joseph Emmanuel Ackah			—
Majority				—
Turnout		18,389	29.7	—

== See also ==
- List of Ghana Parliament constituencies
