= Pierre Issa =

South African soccer player

Personal information
- Full name: Pierre Sanharib Issa
- Date of birth: 11 September 1975 (age 51)
- Place of birth: Germiston, South Africa
- Height: 1.95 m (6 ft 5 in)
- Position: Centre-back

Youth career
- 1991–1994: Dunkerque

Senior career*
Years	Team	Apps	(Gls)
1994–1995	Dunkerque	28	(2)
1995–2001	Marseille	147	(0)
2001	→ Chelsea (loan)	0	(0)
2001–2002	Watford	15	(1)
2002–2004	Olympic Beirut	49	(6)
2005	Ionikos	15	(1)
2005–2009	OFI	69	(5)
Total		323	(15)

International career
1997–2006	South Africa	47	(0)
- * Club domestic league appearances and goals

Pierre Sanharib Issa (born 11 September 1975) is a South African former professional soccer player who played as a defender. He is the sporting director of Greek side Olympiacos.

== Personal life ==
Issa was born in Germiston, South Africa, to a family of Lebanese Christians who fled Lebanon at the outbreak of the Lebanese Civil War in 1975. The family joined his maternal grandfather, who served as a Lebanese consul in Johannesburg. At the age of 11, Issa relocated to France due to his father's business activities.

== Club career ==
Issa began playing football in Saint-Ouen-l'Aumône at age 11; he joined the academy of French semi-professional side Dunkerque at age 16.

In 1995, Issa started his professional career with Marseille in 1995, and became a naturalised French citizen shortly after. He went on to play in the 1999 UEFA Cup Final.

He moved to Chelsea on loan in January 2001, although he did not play a competitive game for the London-based club.

He is best known in England for his spell with Watford in 2001–02. Signed by new manager Gianluca Vialli from Marseille, Issa scored once, against Portsmouth. Issa was memorably dropped by his stretcher bearers after an injury in a home game against Birmingham City, and was put on the club's transfer list on 14 February 2002, only five months after he had signed for the club. He never played for Watford again, but played for his country at 2002 FIFA World Cup whilst still contracted to Watford.

After leaving Watford, Issa signed for Olympic Beirut and won both Lebanese Premier League and Lebanese FA Cup in his first season with the club, but was released in the 2004–05 season as the club's ownership was changed due to financial considerations.

He signed for Ionikos of Greece and later for OFI, also in Greece, where he stayed until 2009.

== International career ==
Issa played 47 times for South Africa since making his debut on 15 November 1997 against Germany, having also captained his country.

In the 1998 FIFA World Cup, during the opening match, he scored an own goal against France. Issa was also selected for the 2002 FIFA World Cup squad.

== Honours ==
Olympic Beirut

- Lebanese Premier League: 2003
- Lebanese FA Cup: 2003

Individual

- Lebanese Premier League Team of the Season: 2002–03
