= Lebanese people in Senegal =

- (Lebanon) (Senegal)

Total population
- 30,000 (2006); Upper Estimate: 50,000

Regions with significant populations
- Dakar, Thiès, Ziguinchor.

Languages
- Arabic (Lebanese Arabic) · French · Wolof

Religion
- Sunni · Shia · Maronite · Eastern Orthodox

Related ethnic groups
- Lebanese diaspora

There is a significant community of Lebanese people in Senegal. Lebanese migration to Senegal began in the late 19th century, largely motivated by economic prospects in trade and commerce. While retaining cultural ties to Lebanon and largely practicing endogamy, they've assimilated into Senegalese society, predominantly engaged in commerce. Official statistics on the Lebanese population in Senegal are absent, with estimates ranging from 15,000 to 30,000 as of 2006.

== Migration history ==
The first trader from Ottoman Lebanon arrived in French Senegal in the 1860s. However, early migration was slow; by 1900, there were only about one hundred Lebanese living in the country, mostly Shiite Muslims from the vicinity of Tyre. They worked as street vendors in Dakar, Saint-Louis and Rufisque. After World War I, they began to move into the peanut trade. With the establishment of the French Mandate of Lebanon, Lebanese immigration expanded sharply. During the Great Depression and again after World War II, French traders lobbied the government to restrict Lebanese immigration; however, the government generally ignored such lobbying.

== Demographics ==
As of 2006, official data on the Lebanese population in Senegal remains unavailable. Estimates range from 25,000–30,000 according to the Consulate Officer at the Lebanese Embassy in Dakar, whereas the Director General of the Ministry of Emigrants in Beirut suggests a decrease to 15,000 from a prior estimate of 30,000. This discrepancy highlights challenges in assessing the Lebanese community in Senegal, including differing citizenship statuses, incomplete embassy registrations, and complexities in categorizing individuals from mixed marriages.

== Interethnic relations ==
During the colonial period, the Lebanese tended to support independence movements. Their social position outside of the colonial relationship, as neither colonist nor colonised, enabled them to maintain good relations with both Senegalese consumers as well as the large French businessmen. After Senegal gained independence in 1960, most French small traders left the country; however, indigenous Senegalese people began to compete increasingly with the Lebanese in the peanut sector, and soon after, the whole peanut marketing sector was nationalised.

Lebanese migrants and their descendants have tended to maintain dual citizenship of both Lebanon and Senegal. Most speak Arabic, Wolof and French, and some have become involved in Senegalese politics. However, they are a fairly endogamous community.

In the early 2000s, the Lebanese began to be displaced from their position as a market-dominant minority by the influx of Chinese traders and the cheap goods they brought from China; as a result, the Lebanese began to shift to a pattern of buying goods from the Chinese and reselling them in remote areas of the country where no Chinese migrants lived.

== See also ==
- Arab diaspora
- Lebanese diaspora
- Lebanese people in Ivory Coast
- Lebanese people in South Africa
- Lebanese people in Sierra Leone
- Shia Islam in Senegal
- Christianity in Senegal

== Bibliography ==
- Boumedouha, Saïd (1990), "Adjustment to West African Realities: The Lebanese in Senegal", Africa: Journal of the International African Institute, 60 (4): 538–549, doi:10.2307/1160207, JSTOR 1160207, S2CID 145300043
- Leichtman, Mara A. (2005), "The legacy of transnational lives: Beyond the first generation of Lebanese in Senegal", Ethnic and Racial Studies, 28 (4): 663–686, doi:10.1080/13569320500092794, S2CID 144395215
- Gaye, Adama (July 2008), "China in Africa: After the Gun and the Bible—a West African Perspective" (PDF), in Soares de Oliveira, Ricardo; Alden, Christopher; Large, Daniel (eds.), China Returns to Africa: A Rising Power and a Continent Embrace, Columbia University Press, pp. 129–142, ISBN 978-0-231-70098-6
- O'Brien, Rita Cruise (1975), "Lebanese Entrepreneurs in Senegal: Economic Integration and the Politics of Protection", Cahiers d'études africaines, 15 (57): 95–115, doi:10.3406/cea.1975.2612
