= Hisham Mackie =

Sierra Leonean businessman (born 1969)

Hisham Mackie (born 1969) is a Sierra Leonean businessman. He is by far the biggest diamond exporter from Sierra Leone, accounting for 51% of all official Sierra Leone diamond exports Mackie runs H.M Diamond, a company which accounted for 40% of all diamond exports in 2005.

== Biography ==
Hisham Mackie was born in Freetown, Sierra Leone on April 6, 1969 to a Lebanese family which has been in the diamond business since 1952. His father, a second generation Sierra Leonean-Lebanese, was among the first diamond dealers licensed by the Sierra Leone government during the early sixties. Mackie did his secondary education at the famous and elite Bo School in Bo and graduated in 1986. After graduating from the Bo School, he went to England where he attended the University of London in 1987. Mackie joined the diamond business in 2002 as an export license holder.
