= Gamal Nkrumah =

Ghanaian journalist (1958–2026)

Gamal Gorkeh Nkrumah
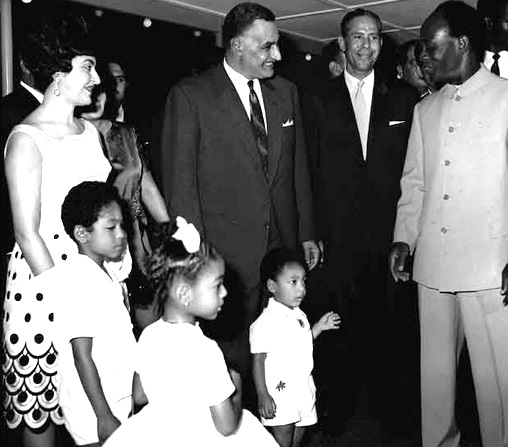
- A young Gamal (left) and family, 1965, with Kwame Nkrumah at right
- Born: 18 March 1958; Accra, Ghana
- Died: 14 October 2026 (aged 68); Cairo, Egypt
- Education: School of Oriental and African Studies
- Occupation: Journalist
- Notable credit: Al Ahram Weekly
- Title: Editor, international affairs
- Children: 2
- Parent(s): Kwame Nkrumah (father); Fathia Nkrumah (mother)
- Relatives: Samia Nkrumah (sister)

Gamal Gorkeh Nkrumah (18 March 1958 – 14 October 2026) was a Ghanaian journalist, Pan-Africanist and an editor of Al Ahram Weekly newspaper. He was the eldest son of the first president of Ghana, Kwame Nkrumah, with his Egyptian mother Fathia Nkrumah. His sister is the Ghanaian politician Samia Nkrumah.

Gamal Nkrumah received his doctorate in political science from the School of Oriental and African Studies in London. He initially worked as a political journalist at Al-Ahram Weekly in Cairo for more than 15 years. He was editor of the international affairs section at the newspaper. Gamal Nkrumah died in Cairo on 14 October 2026, at the age of 68.
