= Nile Badrawi Hospital =

- Cleopatra Hospitals Group

Geography
- Location: Cairo, Egypt
- Coordinates: 29.982611°N 31.231198°E

Services
- Emergency department: Yes
- Beds: 152

Helipads
- Helipad: No

History
- Founded: 1985

Nile Badrawi Hospital is a private hospital that was established in 1985 in Cairo, Egypt. The hospital hosts 152 beds, 7 operating rooms, a complete radiological department, and an exceptionally high tech lab.

The Emergency Department has two ambulances, and is managed by doctors who are supported by on call consultants and professors in all medical specialties.

The hospital has an oncology department for management of tumors by the three available modalities namely surgical, chemotherapy and radiotherapy.

At Nile Badrawi, there is also a unit for renal transplantation, haemodialysis and peritoneal dialysis.

There is also a Neonatal Unit with incubators, ventilators and monitoring equipment. The Intensive Care Unit and the Coronary Care Unit are equipped with medical technology.

The Infertility unit, which is the first in Egypt, is equipped to offer IVF services. A Physiotherapy facility for the rehabilitation of patients after CVA and sport injuries is also available.

Some of the other services include general surgery, neurosurgery, and plastic surgery, etc.
