= Joseph Rahme =

South African-American tennis player

Joseph Rahme Joseph Edmund Rahme (born 16 May 1971 in Johannesburg, South Africa) is a male South African, and later American, tennis professional. Rahme attended the University of Nebraska–Lincoln, where he studied Business Administration and lettered in tennis in 1989-90-92. He was the 1990 Big 8 Conference Singles Champion at number 6 singles while attending the University of Nebraska–Lincoln. Rahme turned professional in 1992 and competed on the ITF Men's Circuit and ATP Tour from 1992 to 1999. Rahme completed his Business Administration degree with UNISA in 1998. Rahme has been a certified tennis professional through the Professional Tennis Registry since 1999. He received the Georgia Professional Tennis Association's "Independent Professional of the Year" award in 2009, and again in 2014.

Rahme grew up one of seven children in a Catholic family in Johannesburg, South Africa. He has five older sisters and a younger brother. Rahme attended high school at King Edward VII School in Johannesburg, South Africa, which he graduated from in 1988. He was one of South Africa's top ranked junior tennis players.
