= Lebanese people in Ivory Coast =

Lebanese people in the Ivory Coast
- (Lebanon) (Ivory Coast)

Total population
- 80,000 - 100,000; Upper Estimate: 300,000

Regions with significant populations
- Abidjan, Yamoussoukro, Bouaké, San-Pédro.

Languages
- French, Arabic, Akan languages and other Languages of Ivory Coast.

Religion
- Islam (primarily Shia), Christianity

Related ethnic groups
- Lebanese diaspora

Lebanese people in the Ivory Coast are a community of people whose ancestors are Lebanese and either emigrated to the Ivory Coast directly or are descended from those who did. It is the largest Lebanese diaspora in Africa.

The number of Lebanese people in the Ivory Coast are variously estimated in the tens or hundreds of thousands. They are the largest Lebanese diaspora community in West Africa. 80% of the Lebanese community in Ivory Coast lives in Abidjan, and about 20% of them live in Bouaké.

== Migration history ==
There have been two major waves of migration from Lebanon to the Ivory Coast; the two groups, the durables (established families) and the nouveaux (newcomers), form separate communities. Though Lebanese migration to other countries of West Africa began as early as the 1890s, the colonial economy of the Ivory Coast did not develop until after World War I, and as such, no Lebanese community formed there until the 1920s. The journey took several weeks; migrants traveled by donkey from their home villages in southern Lebanon to Beirut, and from there took a ship to Marseille, where they would have to wait for one of the infrequent departures to West Africa. Some may have originally intended to head for the United States, but either found upon arrival in Marseille that they could not afford the fare and thus opted for a cheaper journey to West Africa, or were tricked into boarding ships for the wrong destination. Other early migrants did not come straight from Lebanon, but were instead drawn from among the children of earlier Lebanese migrants to Senegal. The community grew quickly due to the relative lack of entry formalities compared to other West African countries.

Beginning in the mid-1970s, a new wave of Lebanese émigrés began to arrive, fleeing the Lebanese Civil War. Their presence sparked government fears that they might bring with them the sectarian violence of their homeland; however, no such violence actually erupted. By the late 1980s, reportedly 60,000 to 120,000 Lebanese and Syrians lived in the Ivory Coast, although some observers gave a figure as high as 300,000. Many of these later migrants came from the town of Zrarieh in southern Lebanon. With recent advances in transport and communications, a form of transnationalism has emerged among the community; people are constantly going back and forth between Lebanon and the Ivory Coast, and greeting and farewell parties for new arrivals and departures have become "significant ritualised events".

== Trade and employment ==
The Lebanese began at the lowest level of commerce, trading in inexpensive commodities, but, during the Great Depression, expanded their scale of enterprise and began to displace independent European merchants. The petits blancs, in response, began a campaign to restrict Lebanese immigration, but government efforts in this regard were mostly ineffective. The Lebanese also invested heavily in urban real estate and were among the first to develop hotels and restaurants in previously less accessible areas of the interior. More recently, they have also become involved in football scouting, establishing training schools for youths and helping them to establish contact with European clubs. Groups from different villages in Lebanon dominate different trades; for example, those from Zrarieh are involved in the plastics business, while those from Qana work with textiles.

Lebanese Ivorians claim that they control about 40% of the economy of the Ivory Coast.

== Gender issues ==
The Lebanese community is largely endogamous. Young men hoping to get married either look for a Lebanese woman locally or else travel back to their ancestral villages in Lebanon and marry a woman there before bringing her back to the Ivory Coast. However, this has not always been the case. In the early 20th century, it was common for young Lebanese male migrants to be so poor that they could not afford such a trip back, or even to pay the fare to the Ivory Coast for a bride their relatives had arranged; as such, they married African women instead. Women's fashion has diverged sharply from the former agricultural norm in southern Lebanon, with competing "modern Muslim" and "westernised" styles, both consisting of clothes which seek to distinguish themselves from the so-called "peasant look" indicating that the wearer engages in manual labour.

== Interethnic relations ==
The Lebanese diaspora in the Ivory Coast is divided into two distinct communities: the people who have been in the country for two or more generations (durables) and the people who have only arrived in the country in the past two decades (nouveaux). Both groups find themselves vulnerable to political pressure and manipulation because of their inability to assimilate into Ivoirian society.

The Lebanese were particularly targeted by looters during the 2010–11 Ivorian crisis, after Lebanon’s ambassador to Ivory Coast, Ali Ajami, attended Laurent Gbagbo's presidential swearing-in ceremony (one of only two diplomats to do so), despite widespread support for his rival, Alassane Ouattara. Many Lebanese were also seen by Ivorians as being pro-Gbagbo.

== See also ==
- Arab diaspora
- Lebanese diaspora
- Lebanese people in South Africa
- Lebanese people in Senegal
- Lebanese people in Sierra Leone

== Bibliography ==
- Bierwirth, Chris (1997), "The Initial Establishment of the Lebanese Community in Cote d'Ivoire, ca. 1925-45", The International Journal of African Historical Studies, 30 (2): 325–348, doi:10.2307/221231, JSTOR 221231
- Bierwirth, Chris (1998), "The Lebanese communities of Cote D'Ivoire", African Affairs (98): 79–99, archived from the original on 2009-10-30
- Bigo, Didier (1992), "The Lebanese Community in the Ivory Coast: A Non-native Network at the Heart of Power?", in Hourani, Albert; Shehadi, Nadim (eds.), The Lebanese in the World: A Century of Emigration, I. B. Tauris, pp. 509–530, ISBN 978-1-85043-303-3
- Handloff, Robert E., ed. (1988), "The Levantine Community", Ivory Coast, Library of Congress Country Studies, Washington, DC
- Peleikis, Anja (2000), "The emergence of a translocal community: the case of a south Lebanese village and its migrant connections to Ivory Coast" (PDF), Cahiers d'études sur la Méditerranée orientale et le monde turco-iranien (30): 297–317
- Peleikis, Anja (2000b), "Female identities in a 'globalized village': a case study of South Lebanese migration to West Africa", in Jacqueline Knörr; Barbara Meier (eds.), Women and migration: anthropological perspectives, Palgrave Macmillan, pp. 63–79, ISBN 978-0-312-23239-9
