= Allan Thomas =

Lebanese-South African footballer

Personal information
- Full name: Allan Thomas
- Date of birth: 14 December 1990 (age 35)
- Place of birth: Benoni, South Africa
- Height: 1.75 m (5 ft 9 in)
- Position: Goalkeeper

Senior career*
Years	Team	Apps	(Gls)
2007–2010	Moroka Swallows		
- * Club domestic league appearances and goals

Allan Thomas (Arabic: ألان توماس; born 14 December 1990) is a Lebanese-South African football goalkeeper who is currently playing on Moroka Swallows in South Africa. The Ally Cat has been playing for the Swallows in the Premier Soccer League since the 2007–08 season.

== Career ==
He played for Moroka Swallows.
