= Emmanuel Addow-Obeng =

Ghanaian academic, administrator and cleric

- Education: PhD in New Testament Studies
- Occupations: Academic, university administrator, theologian
- Employer(s): Presbyterian University College, Ghana
- Known for: Vice-Chancellor of the University of Cape Coast
- Awards: Order of the Volta (2007); Doctor of Letters, University of Cape Coast (2012); Doctor Honoris Causa, University of Aberdeen (2013)

Emmanuel Addow-Obeng is a Ghanaian academic, administrator and cleric. He was the vice chancellor of the University of Cape Coast and served as the pro vice chancellor of the Central University of Ghana. He is currently the President of President of the Presbyterian University College.

== Educational and working life ==
Addow-Obeng obtained a Doctor of Philosophy degree from the University of Aberdeen in 1981. He returned to the University of Cape Coast to take up an appointment as a senior lecturer. After just a year at the university he moved to the University of Ilorin, Nigeria where he lectured till 1990. He moved to the Moi University, Eldoret, Kenya that same year and was promoted to full professorship in New Testament Studies and Theology in 1996. After years working outside Ghana, he returned in 1997 to the University of Cape Coast to head the Department of Religion. He was appointed the vice chancellor of the University of Cape Coast in 2001. He had a sabbatical at the Central University from 2008 to 2010. The release said Prof Addow-Obeng had also taught at Central University College, Miotso, Ghana, where he had spent his sabbatical in 2008–2010. In 1997, he returned from Kenya to teach at the University of Cape Coast. He has thirty-three years experience at the university level and is an ordained minister of the Presbyterian Church of Ghana. He is married with two sons.

== Publications ==
Addow-Obeng has published several books and articles in several national and international journals as well as served on several National and International Boards and committee. He has also authored chapters in books as well as edited books.

== Awards ==
- Bruce and Fraser Award of the University of Aberdeen
- Order of Volta of the Republic of Ghana
- Honorary degree of Doctor of Letters, University of Cape Coast
- Doctors Honoris from the University of Aberdeen (UK)
