= Kwame Nkrumah Memorial Park =

Building, park and museum in Ghana

Coordinates: 5°32′40″N 0°12′10″W

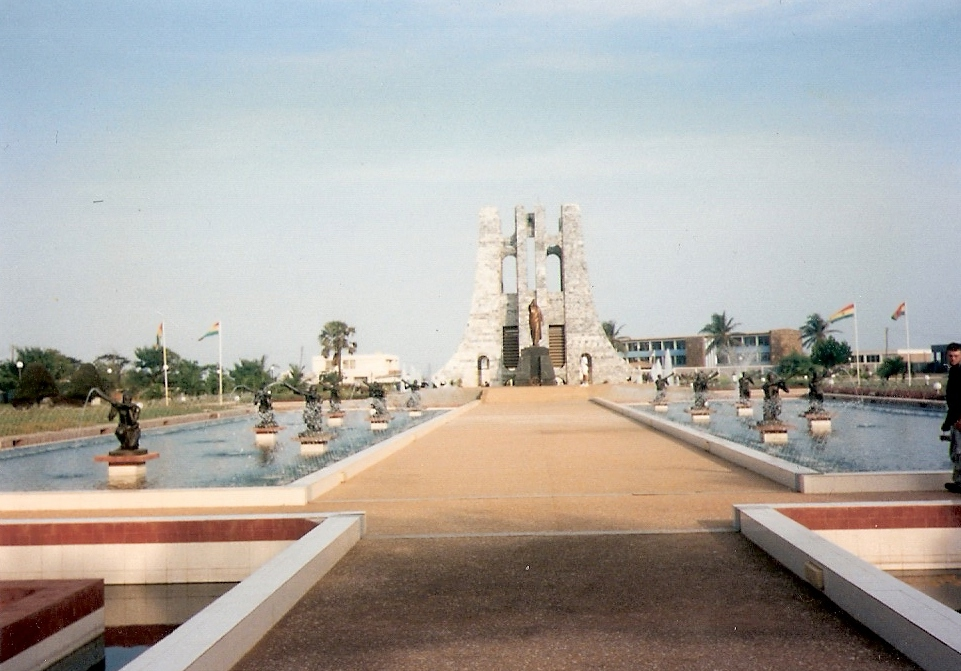

- Location within Ghana
- Established: 1 July 1992
- Dissolved: The Museum was shut down for one year for renovations and was opened to the public on the 4th of July 2023. The newly renovated Museum was commissioned by the president of Ghana, Pre. Akufo Addo.
- Location: Accra, Ghana

Kwame Nkrumah Mausoleum

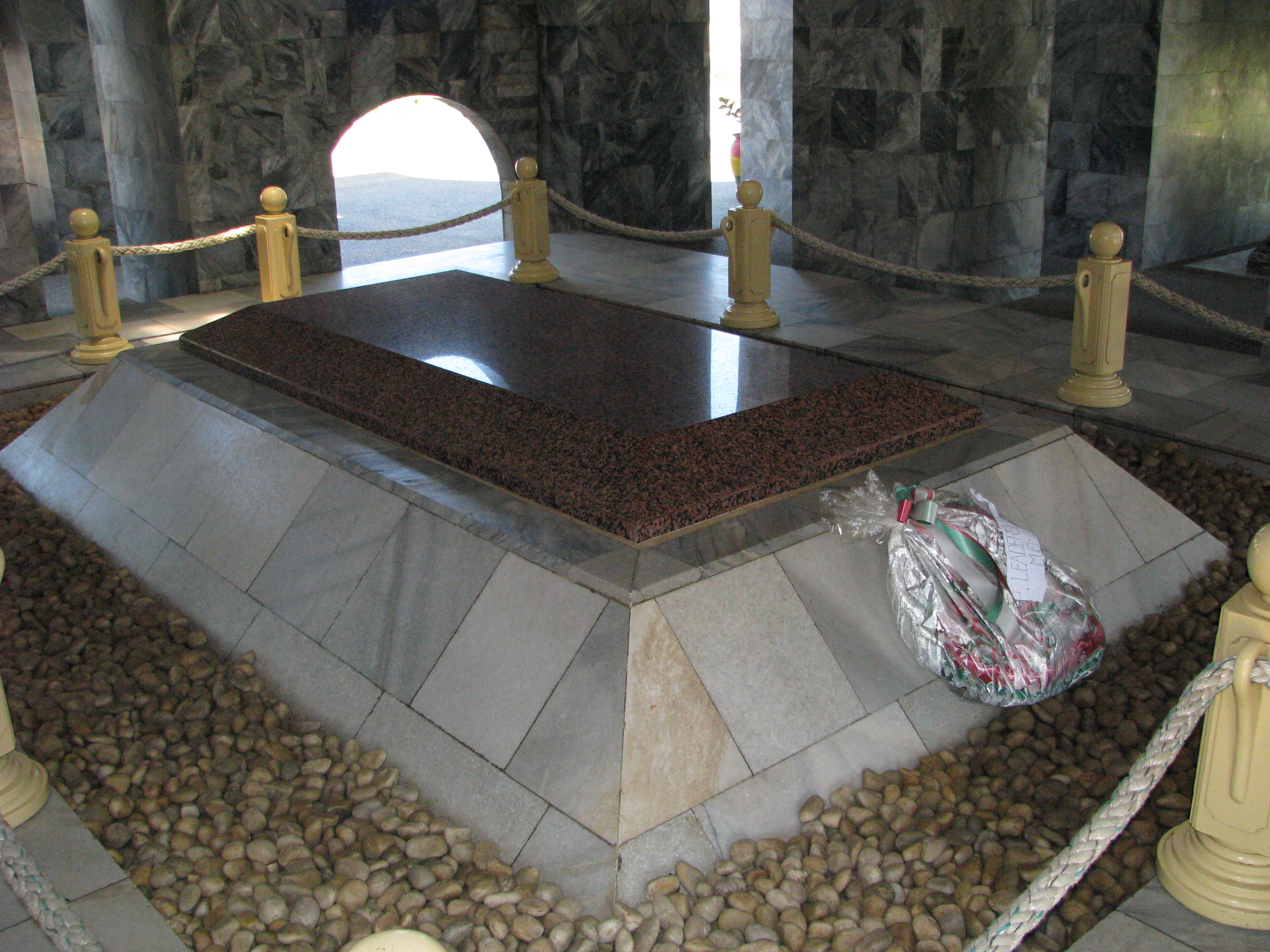
Kwame Nkrumah's grave inside the Kwame Nkrumah Memorial in Accra

The Kwame Nkrumah Memorial Park and Mausoleum is located in downtown Accra, the capital of Ghana.

The mausoleum, originally designed by Dr. E. G. A. Don Arthur, is the centerpiece of the Kwame Nkrumah Memorial Park and houses the final remains of the first President and his wife, Fathia Nkrumah.

== History ==
The Mausoleum is dedicated to the prominent Ghanaian President Kwame Nkrumah. The memorial complex was dedicated in 1992, and is situated on the site of the former British colonial polo grounds in Accra. It is five acres in size.

It is the spot where Nkrumah made the declaration of Ghana's independence. On the premises is a museum that has on display objects from various stages of his life. The building is meant to represent an upside down sword, which in Akan culture is a symbol of peace. The mausoleum is clad from top to bottom with Italian marble, with a black star at its apex to symbolize unity. The interior boasts marble flooring and a mini mastaba looking marble grave marker, surrounded by river-washed rocks. A skylight at the top in the mausoleum illuminates the grave. The mausoleum is surrounded by water, a symbol of life.

Nkrumah's political journey began after twelve years abroad, where he pursued higher education and refined his political philosophy. On his return to the Gold Coast, he established the Convention People's Party, quickly winning over the masses with his promise of national independence. Nkrumah's vision came to fruition in 1957 when the Gold Coast declared independence from Britain, and in 1960, Ghanaians elected Nkrumah as their president under a new constitution.

== Disrepair ==
Despite its popularity, the Kwame Nkrumah Memorial Park did not undergo significant renovation in its 25-year existence. Issues such as malfunctioning fountains, leaky roofs in the museum, and deteriorating facilities impacted the overall visitor experience.

On the 28th of May 2022, the government through its Ministry of Tourism closed down the Nkrumah Mausoleum to a temporary renovation.

== Refurbishment ==
A year later after its closure, what appeared to be a standard facelift and refurbishment was opened to the public on the 4th of July 2023 with a redesign by Bethel Maphrey The facelift cost an estimated US$3.5 million, which was part of a US$40 million World Bank development project fund for the development of tourism in various countries.

The Ministry of Tourism anticipates the facelift to help generate US$3.4 billion in tourism generated revenue.

=== New Features ===
The newly refurbished facility boasts of an array of facelifts and additional features:

1. A presidential library
2. A reception facility
3. An amphitheatre
4. A restaurant
5. Freedom hall
6. Digitalized payment and access system.
7. Audio-visual tunnel
8. A gift shop
