= Samia Nkrumah =

Ghanaian politician (born 1960)

Honourable Samia Nkrumah MP
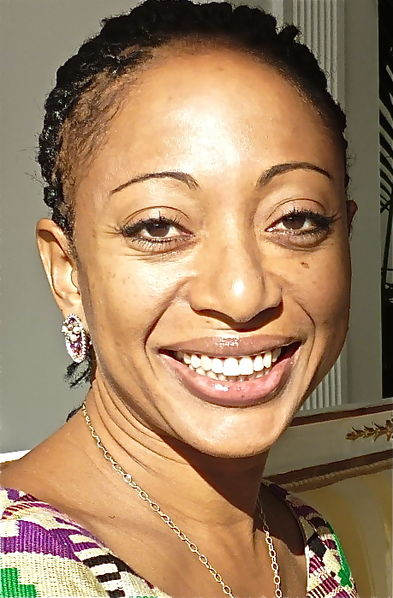
- Nkrumah in 2009

Chairperson of the Convention People's Party
- In office September 2011 – September 2015
- Preceded by: Ladi Nylander
- Succeeded by: Edmund N. Delle

Member of Parliament for Jomoro constituency
- In office 7 January 2009 – 6 January 2013
- Preceded by: Lee Ocran
- Succeeded by: Francis Kabenlah Anaman

Personal details
- Born: Samia Yaba Christina Nkrumah; 23 June 1960 (age 66) Aburi, Ghana
- Party: Independent
- Spouse: Michele Melega
- Children: 1
- Parent(s): Kwame Nkrumah (father); Fathia Nkrumah (mother)
- Relatives: Gamal Nkrumah (brother)
- Education: School of Oriental and African Studies
- Website: Party website

Honourable Samia Yaba Christina Nkrumah (born 23 June 1960) is a Ghanaian politician and former chairperson of the Convention People's Party (CPP) making her the first woman to ever head a major political party in Ghana. In the 2008 parliamentary election, she won the Jomoro constituency seat on her first attempt. She is the daughter of Kwame Nkrumah, the first President of Ghana.

== Early life and education ==
Samia was born at Aburi in the Eastern Region of Ghana in 1960. She was forced to leave Ghana with her mother and brothers on the day of the 1966 military coup that overthrew Kwame Nkrumah. The family were resettled in Egypt by the Egyptian government. She returned with her family in the year 1975 at the invitation of General Acheampong's National Redemption Council government and attended Achimota School. However, she left the country again when her mother decided to return to Egypt in the early 1980s. Samia proceeded to London, later completing her studies at the School of Oriental and African Studies of the University of London in the United Kingdom, where she obtained the degree of Bachelor Arabic Studies in the year 1991. She also completed a Master's degree at the same institution in the year 1993.

== Career ==
Honourable Samia Nkrumah started work as a bank clerk with the London branch of the Bank of India in 1984. She then worked with Al-Ahram as a journalist in various capacities starting from the year 1989. In 2024, she started working on a coconut factory in Jomoro Constituency, an initiative that seeks to make the Jomoro community a Global Hub for Coconut Processing and add value to the lives of the people living there.

== Politics ==
In an article about her, entitled "The new Mandela is a woman", the Huffington Post described and analyzed her impact on Ghanaian and African politics. She is one of the founders of Africa Must Unite, which aims to promote Kwame Nkrumah's vision and political culture. As part of this philosophy, she decided to go into active politics in Ghana. In 2023, she intended to contest for the Jomoro Constituency seat as an Independent Candidate in the 2024 Ghanaian general election. Samia Nkrumah, a former member of parliament and chair of a major political party in Ghana, urged the president to veto an anti-LGBT bill, calling it "brutal, harsh, and unjust." On February 28, Ghana's parliament passed a draconian bill that increases criminal penalties for consensual same-sex conduct and criminalizes individuals and organizations who advocate for the rights of LGBT people. Additionally, the bill criminalizes failure to report an LGBT person to the authorities and to report anyone who uses their social media platform to produce, publish, or disseminate content promoting activities prohibited by the bill.

Since then, prominent individuals, such as Nkrumah, have urged President Nana Akuffo Addo to reject the bill. This includes a memo from Ghana's finance minister to the president, warning of the bill's disastrous economic consequences if it were to become law.

=== Member of Parliament ===
In December 2008, she contested the Jomoro constituency seat in the Western Region of Ghana and beat the incumbent MP, Lee Ocran of the National Democratic Congress (NDC) with a majority of 6,571, winning about 50% of the total valid votes cast. Being the only CPP member of parliament, she had to either align with NDC who were the majority in parliament or the minority NPP. She decided on the latter, aligning with the NPP in the House of 5th Parliament of the 4th Republic of Ghana. She represented the constituency from 2011 to 2015.

=== Chairperson of CPP ===
She became the first woman to ever head a major political party in Ghana. Her victory, along with three other female members of the party, is hailed as marking the renaissance of the ailing CPP, and an affirmation of the party's long held tradition of promoting women's rights. She was elected as the first woman chairperson of the Convention People's Party on 10 September 2011. She won the poll with 1,191 votes, and her nearest contender, the incumbent, polled 353 votes. With this feat, she became the first woman to ever head a major political party in Ghana. She served in this role until 2015.

== Personal life ==
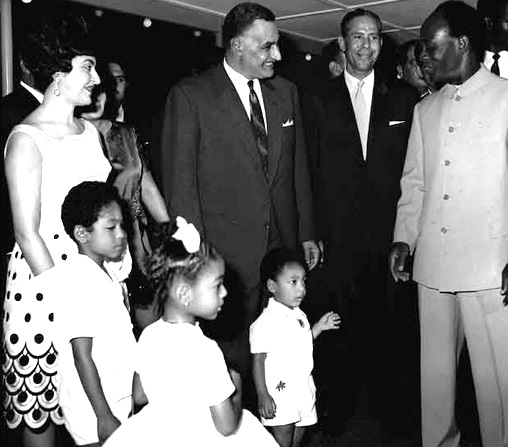
Nkrumah, his family and Nasser, 1965 (The little girl - Samia Nkrumah)

Samia is the second child and only daughter of Kwame Nkrumah, Ghana's first President and his Copt wife, Fathia Nkrumah. Nkrumah was the first Prime Minister and President of Ghana, having led the Gold Coast to independence from Britain in 1957.

An influential advocate of pan-Africanism, Nkrumah was a founding member of the Organization of African Unity and winner of the Lenin Peace Prize from the Soviet Union in 1962.

Samia has two brothers, Gamal Nkrumah (born 1958) and Sekou Nkrumah (born 1963). She also has an older paternal half-brother, Professor Francis Nkrumah (1936–2024), a retired lecturer of medical sciences and consultant pediatrician, who previously worked as director of the Noguchi Memorial Institute for Medical Research in Legon, Ghana and the only child of his relationship with a Euro-African woman, Fanny Miller whom he was briefly married prior to furthering studies in the United Kingdom. In July 2023, she had a debate with her brother Sekou Nkrumah on whether their father was a dictator or not.

After her father was overthrown in Ghana's first successful military coup d'état on 24 February 1966, Samia, her mother, and her brothers, had to flee to Cairo, Egypt on a plane sent by Egyptian President, Gamal Abdel Nasser, to stay in the country while her father went into exile in Guinea.

She is married to Michele Melega, an Italian-Danish man. They have a son, Kwame Thomas Melega. Samia is fluent in Arabic, Italian, Danish, and English. She has worked many years as a journalist and media consultant, including in the Egyptian media space. She is also an advocate against child marriage, for women's empowerment, and women's affairs.

Parliament of Ghana
| Preceded by Lee Ocran | Member of Parliament for Jomoro; 2009–2013 | Succeeded by Francis Kabenlah Anaman |
