= Ken Costa =

South African banker and philanthropist

Kenneth "Ken" Costa
- Born: 31 October 1949 (age 76); South Africa
- Education: University of the Witwatersrand; Queens' College, Cambridge
- Occupation: Banker

Kenneth Johann Costa, commonly known as Ken Costa, (born 31 October 1949) is a London-based South African banker and Christian philanthropist. He served as the Chairman of Lazard from 2007 to 2011.

== Early life ==
Ken Costa was born in South Africa on 31 October 1949. His family were farmers of Lebanese descent. He was educated at a boarding school in Pretoria.

He graduated from the University of the Witwatersrand, where he received a bachelor's degree in Law and Philosophy in 1972. During that time, he was the President of the students' council and identified as a marxist. He was an opponent of the apartheid regime and friends with fellow anti-apartheid activists like Ahmed Timol and Steve Biko.

He went on to receive a Masters of Law Degree and a Certificate in Theology from Queens' College, Cambridge in England.

== Career ==
Costa started his career in banking at S. G. Warburg & Co. in London in the 1980s, when he was mentored by Sir Siegmund Warburg. He joined UBS when S. G. Warburg & Co. merged with it. He eventually served as the Chairman of Europe, Middle East and Africa at UBS Investment Bank, retiring in September 2007.

He served as the Chairman of Lazard International from 2007 to 2011. He was an advisor to Mohamed Al-Fayed on his 1.5 billion sale of Harrods to the Qatari royal family.

In 2011 with other bankers he set up DMC Partners, a private equity fund that aimed to raise $2bn to invest in emerging markets. But the fund had to close in 2014 after failing to raise enough money.

In December 2014, he joined the Board of Directors of Songbird Estates, which owns 70% of Canary Wharf, replacing Khalifa Al-Kuwari.

In 2018 he became a Partner and Co-Chairman of Alvarium Investments, a private wealth management business, offering corporate finance deals to ultra-wealthy families.

Costa dismissed concerns about Saudi Arabia’s purchase of Newcastle United Football Club as just “noise” created by people jealous of the investment. His comment was criticised by Amnesty International and Layla Moran, foreign affairs spokesperson for the Liberal Democrats, who said “The Saudi Arabian government has one of the worst human rights records in the world: brushing that off as just noise is outrageous.”

He was Professor of Commerce at Gresham College and he is the dean of Leadership College London.

== Christian philanthropy ==
He is the Chairman of Alpha International, which promotes the Alpha course. He has spoken at Holy Trinity Brompton, where he was previously a church warden, and also at New Wine. He is the author of God At Work, a 2007 book about Christianity's relationship to the workplace and Know Your Why in 2016, a book about finding and fulfilling your calling.

== Political activity ==
Costa donated £50,000 to the Conservative Party in 2010, and gave £10,000 to Jeremy Hunt during the 2019 Conservative Party leadership election. During the 2019 United Kingdom general election, he donated £25,000 to the Conservative Party.

In 2017, UK Prime Minister Theresa May appointed Costa as the UK government’s special envoy to Saudi Arabia’s Vision 2030.

== Personal life ==
He has been married for thirty years and is a fan of Chelsea football club.
