= Lebanese people in Sierra Leone =

Ethnic diaspora

- (Lebanon) (Sierra Leone)

Total population
- 3,000 (estimate, as of 2022) - 30,000 (1984)

Regions with significant populations
- Freetown, Kenema.

Languages
- Krio, Sierra Leonean English, Arabic and others Languages of Sierra Leone.

Religion
- Islam and Christianity mainly Maronite Church.

Related ethnic groups
- Lebanese diaspora

There is a significant population of Lebanese people in Sierra Leone.

== Migration history ==
Lebanese immigrants first came to West Africa in the mid-19th century when a silk-worm crisis struck their homeland, then part of the Ottoman Empire; the first Lebanese arrived in British Sierra Leone in 1893. The first groups were Maronite Christians, but beginning in 1903, Shia Muslim Lebanese began to arrive from South Lebanon where there was an agricultural crunch. They worked as small traders, at first occupying the same position in the economic structure as indigenous coastal traders.

== Trade and employment ==
At first, they had little access to capital and little control of import or export; they were at the mercy of the large colonial merchant firms, the same as indigenous traders. They brought imported manufactured goods such as textiles, jewellery, and mirrors to rural areas where European and creole traders would not go, and traded them for local agricultural produce, primary palm kernels and kola nuts. As they expanded their trading interests into the interior, they gained some commercial power. However, they were blamed for a 1919 rice scarcity, and riots broke out against them in which their shops were looted. Even the colonial authorities, traditionally seen as the patrons of the Lebanese, did not protect them; instead, they deported two Lebanese traders blamed for causing the shortages. This was one of the first major incidents that contributed to the Lebanese having a negative image in Sierra Leone.

In the 1920s, they not only began to enjoy better access to credit, but also began to play a role themselves in extending credit to agricultural producers in the interior, sometimes at exorbitant rates which sparked the intervention of the colonial government. Beginning in the 1930s, the Lebanese began to outcompete indigenous traders, by concentrating their returns from commerce back into the same sector to expand their purchases of goods, rather than diversifying into other sectors. They also began to establish their own links to exporters in other countries. The worldwide Great Depression actually strengthened their position, as smaller African-owned trading enterprises were hit the hardest.

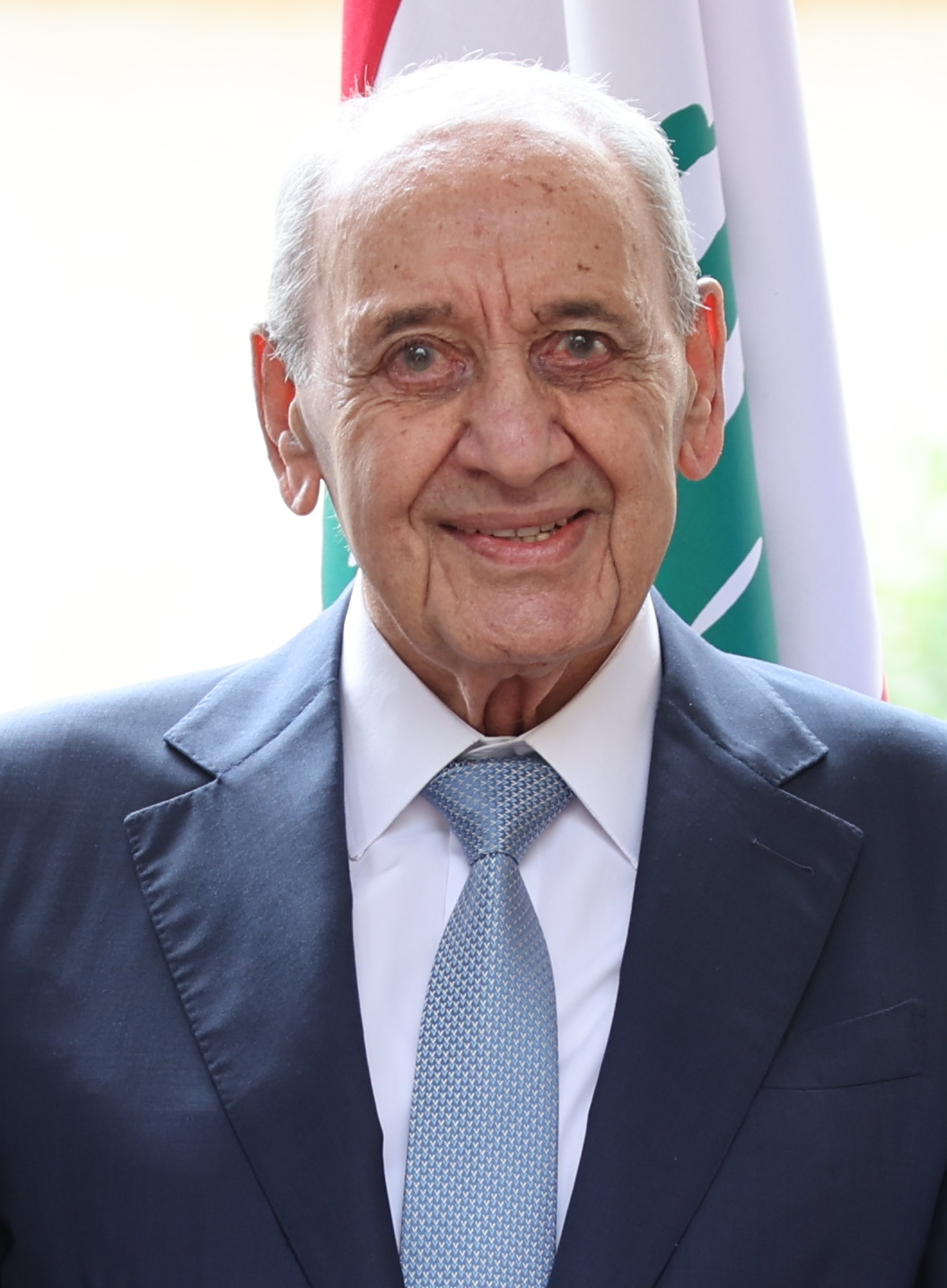
Nabih Berri

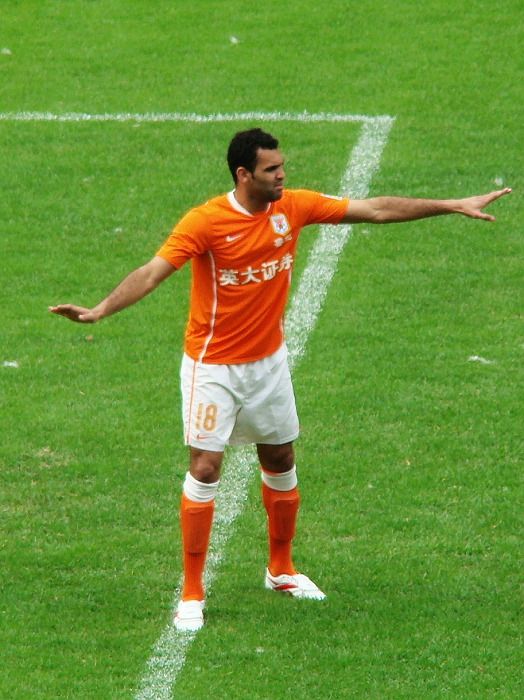
Roda Antar

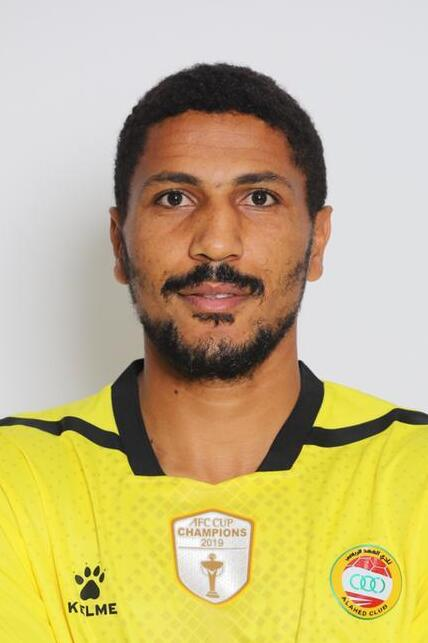
Tarek El-Ali

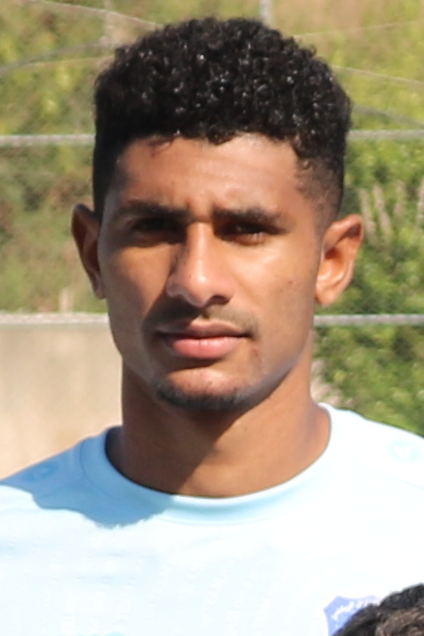
Walid Shour

During the same period, the discovery of diamonds at Kono District in 1930 sparked the beginning of a major shift in the business activities of the Lebanese. The first Lebanese trader arrived in Kono soon after the discovery of diamonds, two years ahead of the British rulers. The establishment of the Sierra Leone Selection Trust's monopoly on diamond mining and export did little to stem their involvement in the diamond trade; many Lebanese traders were deported in the 1940s for illicit diamond trading. By the 1950s, diamonds had become the most important business sector for Lebanese traders. Throughout the 1950s, they continued their diamond smuggling, mainly to Liberia; as many as 20% of diamonds on the world market may have passed through the hands of Lebanese and Mandingo traders in Sierra Leone and Liberia.

However, the Lebanese are not solely active in the diamond sector; they also operate cinemas, hotels, casinos, factories, and travel agencies. From 1963 to 1971, there was even a short-lived Lebanese-owned bank, the Intra Bank.

== Notable people ==
There are five key Lebanese families in Sierra Leone, who had largely consolidated their position by the 1970s; most Lebanese prominent in trade in the country and its neighbours have some connection to them.

== See also ==
- Arab diaspora
- Lebanese diaspora
- Lebanese people in Ivory Coast
- Lebanese people in Senegal
- Lebanese people in South Africa

== Bibliography ==
- Kaniki, Martin H. Y. (1973), "Attitudes and Reactions towards the Lebanese in Sierra Leone during the Colonial Period", Canadian Journal of African Studies, 7 (1): 97–113, JSTOR 483752
- Lansana, Gberie (2002), War and Peace in Sierra Leone: Diamonds, Corruption and the Lebanese Connection (PDF), Partnership Africa Canada Occasional Papers, vol. 6, ISBN 1-894888-16-2, archived from the original (PDF) on 2007-08-02
- Leighton, Neil Owen (1974), "The Lebanese in Sierra Leone", Transition (44): 23–29, doi:10.2307/2935102, JSTOR 2935102
- Mukonoweshuro, Eliphas G. (1993), "The Lebanese Traders: The Rise of a Comprador Bourgeoisie", Colonialism, class formation, and underdevelopment in Sierra Leone, University Press of America, pp. 31–54, ISBN 978-0-8191-8283-8
