= 2028 Lebanese general election =

- May 2028

All 128 seats to the Parliament of Lebanon 65 seats needed for a majority
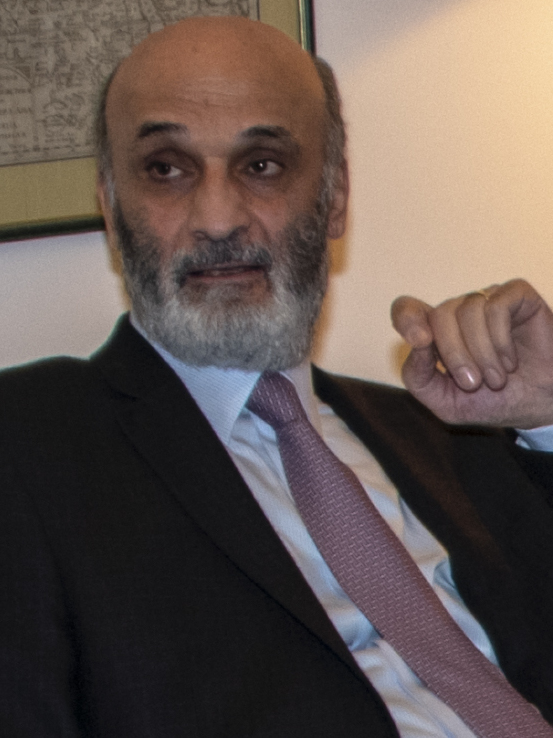

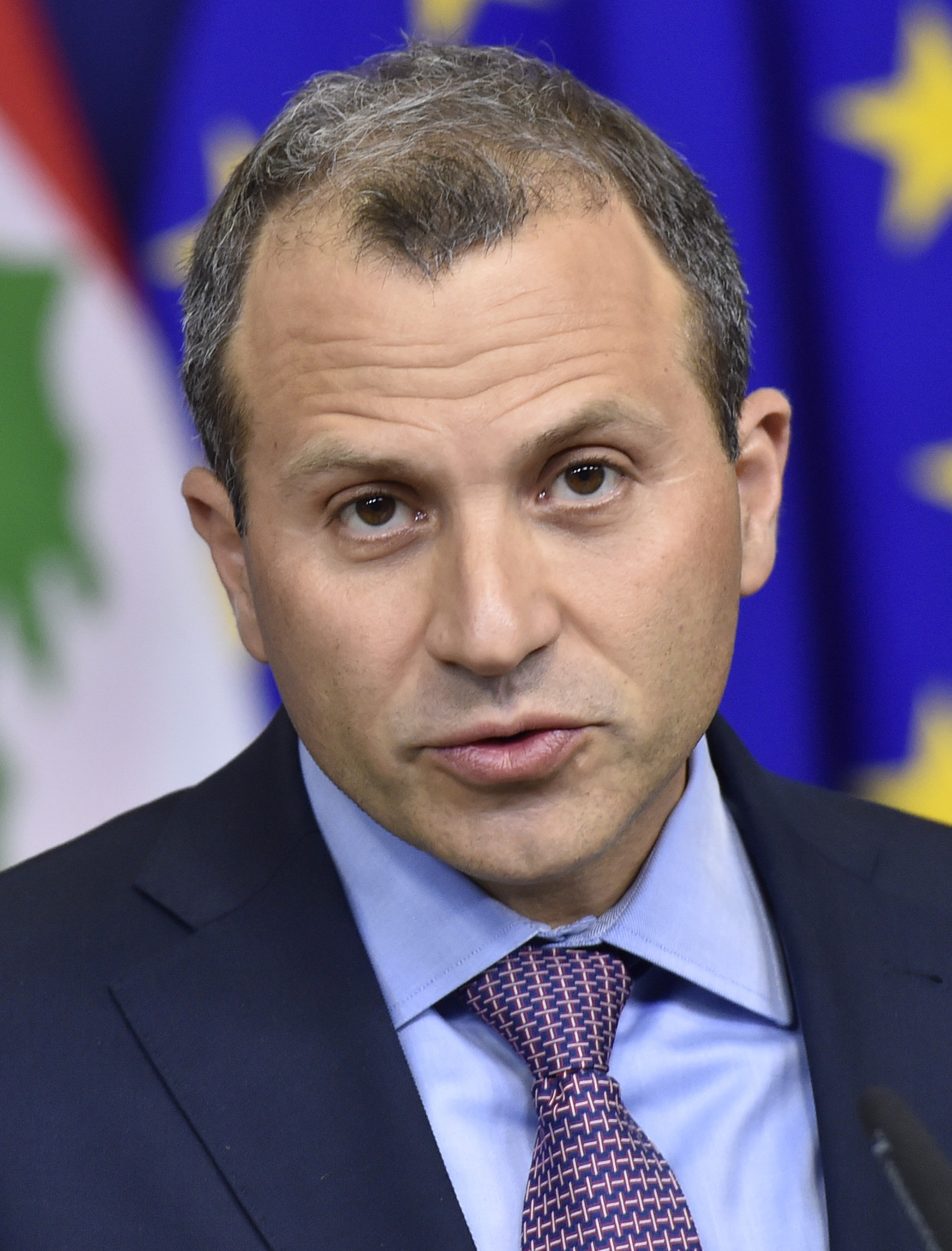

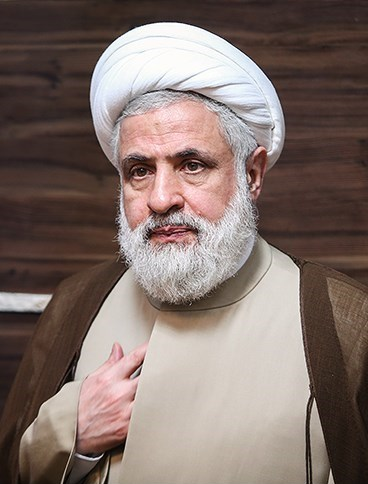

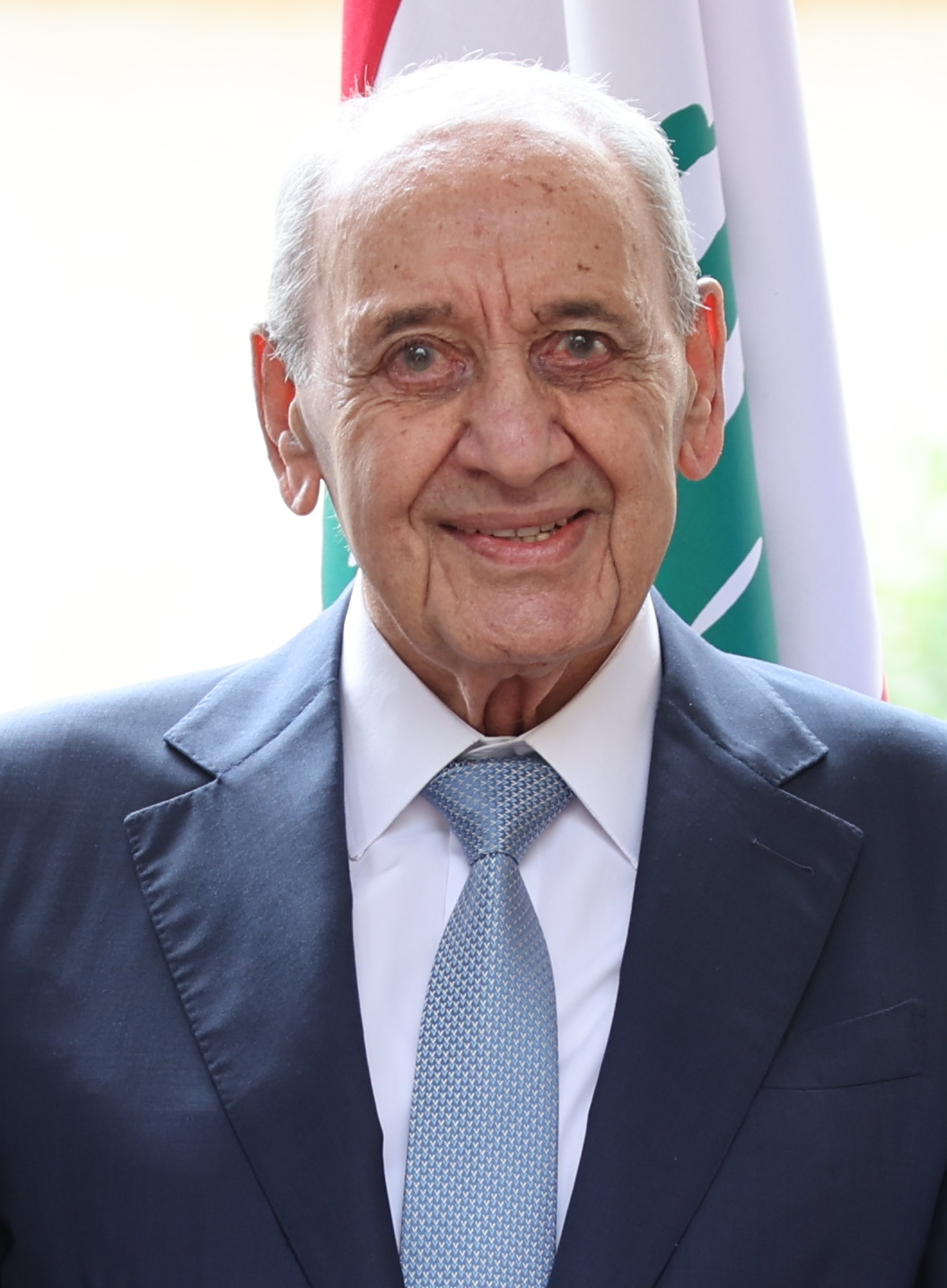

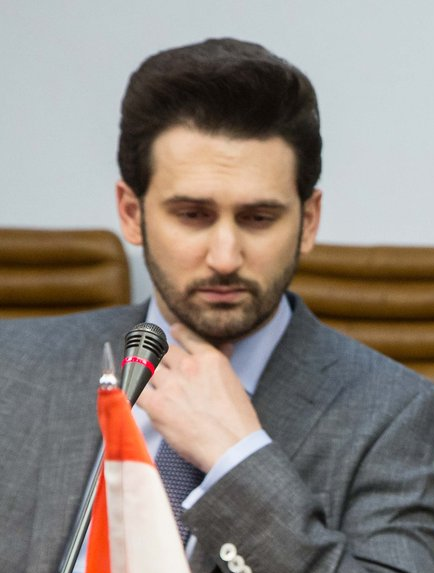

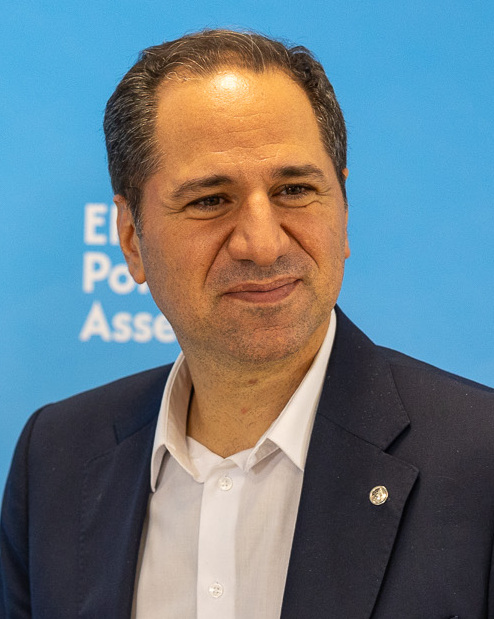

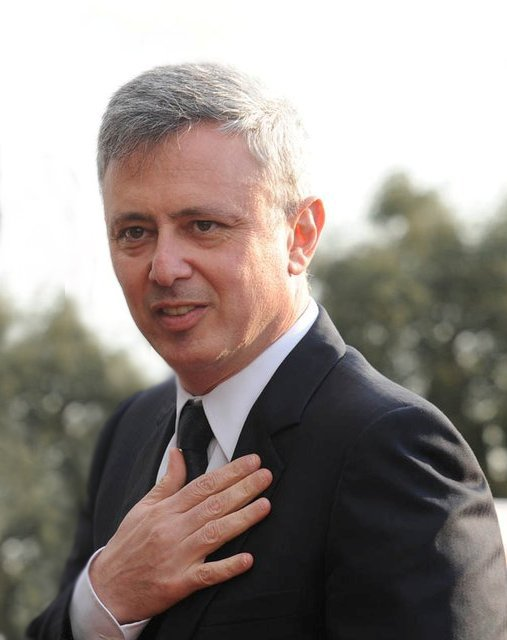

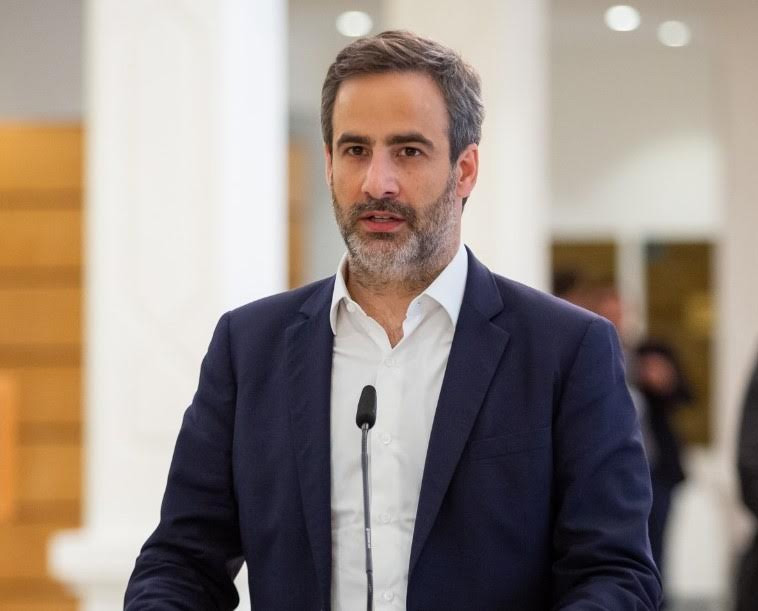
Leader	Samir Geagea	Gebran Bassil	Naim Qassem
Party	Lebanese Forces	FPM	Hezbollah
Leader's seat	Did not stand	Batroun	Did not stand
Last election	19	17	15
Leader	Nabih Berri	Taymur Jumblatt	Samy Gemayel
Party	Amal Movement	PSP	Kataeb
Leader's seat	Zahrani	Chouf	Metn
Last election	15	8	4
Leader	Albert Balabanian	Suleiman Frangieh	Michel Moawad
Party	Tashnag	Marada Movement	Independence Movement
Leader's seat	Metn	Did not stand	Zgharta
Last election	3	2	2
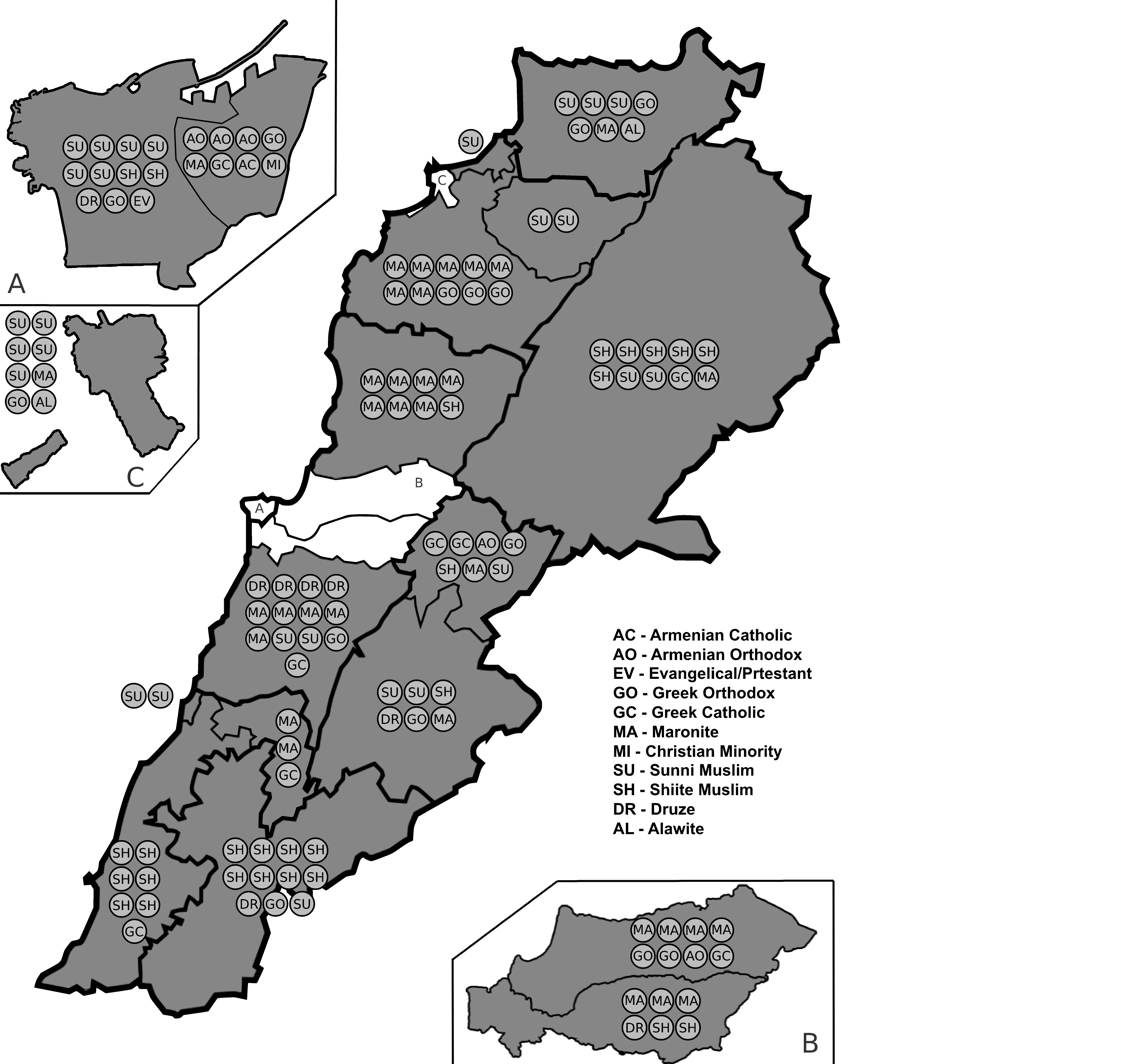
Incumbent Prime Minister
Nawaf Salam
Independent

General elections in Lebanon are scheduled for 2028 to elect all 128 members of the Lebanese Parliament. The elections were originally scheduled for May 2026, but were postponed by Parliament for two years due to the ongoing 2026 Lebanon war.

== Background ==
=== Election of Aoun and appointment of Salam ===
On 9 January 2025, Aoun was elected president in the second round of the electoral session. In his inaugural address, he vowed to fight the mafias, drug trafficking, interference in the justice system, corruption, poverty, and sectarianism. He also stated that he would promote economic, political, and judicial reform.

In one of his first acts as president, Aoun nominated Nawaf Salam, the head of the International Court of Justice, as Prime Minister of Lebanon after winning the majority of votes by the members of parliament. Salam and Aoun's election is seen as a manifestation of Hezbollah's diminished influence in Lebanese politics, partly due to the group's military and financial losses in the conflict with Israel and the fall of the Assad regime in Syria. Aoun formally appointed Salam as Prime Minister on 8 February 2025.

On 2 February 2026 President Aoun and Interior Minister Ahmad Hajjar, signed Decree No. 2438, setting the election dates between 1 and 10 May. Lebanese living abroad were scheduled vote on 1 May and on 3 May, depending on the country they live in. Citizens inside Lebanon were to vote on 10 May.

=== Disarming of Hezbollah ===
Hezbollah, facing regional pressures and internal challenges, expressed willingness to discuss its armament, contingent upon Israel's withdrawal from contested territories in southern Lebanon and the cessation of military strikes. Aoun emphasized direct talks between the presidency and Hezbollah to establish "modalities" for transferring weapons to state control. He stated that he aims to make 2025 the year of "state monopoly on arms". The Lebanese Army, under president Aoun's direction, was tasked with confiscating weapons and dismantling unauthorized military facilities in southern Lebanon. This is in line with the ceasefire agreement following the 2024 Israel-Hezbollah conflict, which requires the army to extend state authority and remove all unauthorized arms caches and outposts, regardless of the group controlling them.

=== Postponement ===
On 9 March 2026, the Lebanese Parliament approved a 2-year term extension during a plenary session, as the war between Israel and Hezbollah escalated. At the time of the extension, over 400 people had been killed and almost half a million displaced. The postponement of the elections by two years was opposed by the majority of Christian parties, who preferred a shorter extension, or one without a fixed date.

== Electorate ==
=== Electoral system ===
In accordance with the Lebanese practice of political confessionalism, the Lebanese religious communities distribute reserved seats in the different constituencies according to their demographic weight. The distribution of votes is proportional. Once all the ballot papers have been counted, the total of valid votes in each constituency is divided by the number of seats to be filled, which gives the electoral threshold necessary for a list to obtain a seat. The distribution of seats is done between the lists having reached this quorum proportionally according to the percentage of votes obtained, then within the lists in accordance with the denominational quotas and the number of preferential votes obtained by the candidates.

Electoral district under 2017 Election Law	Seats	Sunni	Shia	Druze	Alawite	Maronite	Greek Orthodox	Greek Catholic	Armenian Orthodox	Armenian Catholic	Evangelical	Minorities
Beirut I (East Beirut)	8					1	1	1	3	1		1
Beirut II (West Beirut)	11	6	2	1			1				1	
Bekaa I (Zahle)	7	1	1			1	1	2	1			
Bekaa II (West Bekaa-Rachaya)	6	2	1	1		1	1					
Bekaa III (Baalbek-Hermel)	10	2	6			1		1				
Mount Lebanon I (Byblos-Kesrwan)	8		1			7						
Mount Lebanon II (Metn)	8					4	2	1	1			
Mount Lebanon III (Baabda)	6		2	1		3						
Mount Lebanon IV (Aley-Chouf)	13	2		4		5	1	1				
North I (Akkar)	7	3			1	1	2					
North II (Tripoli-Minnieh-Dennieh)	11	8			1	1	1					
North III (Bcharre-Zghorta-Batroun-Koura)	10					7	3					
South I (Saida-Jezzine)	5	2				2		1				
South II (Zahrany-Tyre)	7		6					1				
South III (Marjaayoun-Nabatieh-Hasbaya-Bint Jbeil)	11	1	8	1			1					
Total	128	27	27	8	2	34	14	8	5	1	1	1
Source: elections.gov.lb

=== Registered voters ===
Preliminary lists of the numbers of voters (Feb 2026):

District	Resident registers	Non-resident registers	Total
Akkar	331,943	4,893	336,836
Aley	136,315	5,649	141,964
Baabda	175,091	8,200	183,291
Baalbek-Hermel	365,108	6,279	371,387
Batroun	62,946	4,356	67,302
Beirut I	133,168	5,109	138,277
Beirut II	384,521	13,777	398,298
Bint Jbeil	172,825	6,158	178,983
Bsharre	51,487	4,031	55,518
Chouf	220,478	9,255	229,733
Dinnieh	80,994	1,427	82,421
Jbeil	87,820	4,015	91,835
Jezzine	63,199	3,341	66,540
Keserwan	97,292	5,096	102,388
Koura	63,454	3,301	66,755
Marjaayoun-Hasbaya	185,428	6,423	191,851
Metn	184,281	8,434	192,715
Minnieh	51,852	520	52,372
Nabatieh	169,966	5,693	175,659
Sidon (City)	70,211	1,606	71,817
Tripoli	269,167	4,271	273,438
Tyre	217,482	10,593	228,075
West Bekaa-Rachaya	162,080	3,905	165,985
Zahle	190,057	6,291	196,348
Zahrani	130,256	6,421	136,677
Zgharta	83,682	5,354	89,036
Total	4,141,103	144,406	4,285,509
Source: Directorate General of civil status &

=== Debate of changing the electoral law ===
The electoral system has been a matter of significant debate within Lebanese politics. The key question is whether elections will be held under the current proportional representation system with amendments or under an entirely new law, such as the "single electoral district" proposal by Parliament Speaker Nabih Berri. The proposed single electoral district system raises concerns among Christian parties and independent Christian MPs, who argue that it would significantly diminish the Christian political influence.

== Lebanese living abroad ==
Lebanese citizens living abroad are eligible to participate in legislative elections. Although the Lebanese diaspora is estimated to number several million, a significant portion no longer holds Lebanese nationality due to decades of emigration. Registration for the 2026 elections indicated continued engagement among expatriates, building on trends observed in previous electoral cycles.

Under the 2017 electoral law, six parliamentary seats are allocated specifically for the diaspora; however, expatriate votes are still counted within their respective domestic constituencies. Voting for Lebanese abroad was organized in multiple phases, with citizens residing in Arab countries casting their ballots prior to the main election day in Lebanon, and those living in other regions voting shortly thereafter. Lebanese expatriates were reported to participate from dozens of countries worldwide.

Voter turnout for Lebanese living abroad
Electoral District	District	Votes	Registered	Total votes	Total Registered	% Participation
Beirut 1	East Beirut		5,109		5,109	
Beirut 2	West Beirut		13,777		13,777	
Bekaa 1	Zahle		6,291		6,291	
Bekaa 2	Rachaya – West Bekaa		3,905		3,905	
Bekaa 3	Baalbek – Hermel		6,279		6,279	
Mount Lebanon 1	Keserouane		5,096		9,111	
Mount Lebanon 1	Byblos/Jbeil		4,015		9,111	
Mount Lebanon 2	Metn		8,434		8,434	
Mount Lebanon 3	Baabda		8,200		8,200	
Mount Lebanon 4	Aley		5,649		14,904	
Mount Lebanon 4	Chouf		9,255		14,904	
North 1	Akkar		4,893		4,893	
North 2	Minieh		520		6,226	
North 2	Tripoli		4,279		6,226	
North 2	Denieh		1,427		6,226	
North 3	Zgharta		5,354		17,042	
North 3	Bcharre		4,031		17,042	
North 3	Koura		3,301		17,042	
North 3	Batroun		4,356		17,042	
South 1	Saida		1,606		4,947	
South 1	Jezzine		3,341		4,947	
South 2	Tyre		10,593		17,014	
South 2	Zahrani		6,421		17,014	
South 3	Hasbaya – Marjayoun		6,423		18,274	
South 3	Bint Jbail		6,158		18,274	
South 3	Nabateye		5,693		18,274	
Total	Lebanon		144,406		144,406	

=== Registered voters per country ===
Rank	Country	Registered voters (2022)	Registered voters (2026) 1
Europe		70,432	53,194 ▼
1	France	28,142 (Note: Including 3 Lebanese registered in Adelie Land and 3 registered in Wallis and Futuna)	21,303 ▼
2	Germany	16,171	14,698 ▼
3	United Kingdom	6,535	3,922 ▼
4	Sweden	4,023	3,020 ▼
5	Belgium	3,092	2,593 ▼
6	Switzerland	2,601	2,183 ▼
7	Italy	2,128	1,457 ▼
8	Spain	1,226	722 ▼
9	Netherlands	965	651 ▼
10	Cyprus	840	601 ▼
11	Denmark	706	433 ▼
12	Romania	696	498 ▼
13	Greece	528	264 ▼
14	Ukraine	341	—N/a ▼
15	Russia	323	261 ▼
16	Austria	282	243 ▼
17	Ireland	233	203 ▼
18	Hungary	221	—N/a ▼
19	Poland	215	—N/a ▼
20	Luxembourg	200	322 ▲
21	Belarus	172	—N/a ▼
22	Norway	162	—N/a ▼
23	Czech Republic	153	—N/a ▼
24	Portugal	148	—N/a ▼
25	Rest of Europe	329	—N/a ▼
Asia		56,874	28,655 ▼
1	UAE	25,066	12,739 ▼
2	Saudi Arabia	13,105	6,459 ▼
3	Qatar	7,344	4,562 ▼
4	Kuwait	5,760	514 ▼
5	Syria	1,018	—N/a ▼
6	Turkey	999	255 ▼
7	Oman	903	475 ▼
8	Iran	642	498 ▼
9	Bahrain	638	451 ▼
10	Jordan	483	—N/a ▼
11	Iraq	327	—N/a ▼
12	Armenia	192	—N/a ▼
13	Rest of Asia	397	—N/a ▼
North America		56,680	34,397 ▼
1	USA	27,982	15,345 ▼
2	Canada	27,447	18,658 ▼
3	Mexico	1,242	394 ▼
4	Rest of North America	9	—N/a ▼
Oceania		20,808	11,009 ▼
1	Australia	20,661	11,009 ▼
2	New Zealand	147	—N/a ▼
Africa		18,869	14,898 ▼
1	Ivory Coast	6,070	5,512 ▼
2	Nigeria	2,580	1,910 ▼
3	Congos	1,428	1,355 ▼
4	Ghana	1,012	885 ▼
5	Gabon	848	989 ▲
6	Sierra Leone	724	435 ▼
7	Senegal	707	514 ▼
8	Egypt	709	441 ▼
9	Benin	518	532 ▲
10	Togo	458	451 ▼
11	Zambia	409	441 ▲
12	South Africa	406	200 ▼
13	Liberia	376	218 ▼
14	Guinea	532	208 ▼
15	Angola	332	475 ▲
16	Mali	317	—N/a ▼
17	Burkina Faso	293	144 ▼
18	Morocco	248	—N/a ▼
19	Cameroon	228	188 ▼
20	Equatorial Guinea	178	—N/a ▼
21	Gambia	166	—N/a ▼
22	Rest of Africa	330	—N/a ▼
South America		4,693	2,261 ▼
1	Brazil	2,861	1,447 ▼
2	Venezuela	991	814 ▼
3	Colombia	273	—N/a ▼
4	Ecuador	219	—N/a ▼
5	Argentina	118	—N/a ▼
6	Paraguay	67	—N/a ▼
7	Rest of South America	164	—N/a ▼
Other countries		2,740	12,661 ▲
Total		228,356	144,406 ▼

== Online Voter Registration for the Diaspora ==
The registration process for Lebanese expatriates to vote in the 2026 Lebanese parliamentary elections saw the launch of a new dedicated online platform by the Ministry of Foreign Affairs and Emigrants. The initiative aimed to significantly increase diaspora participation and streamline the logistical process for voting abroad.

=== Launch and Mechanism ===
On 2 October 2025, the Minister of Foreign Affairs and Emigrants, Youssef Rajji, officially announced the opening of the digital voter registration platform. This launch was a collaborative effort with the Ministry of Interior and Municipalities, designed to implement the provisions of Lebanon's electoral law concerning non-resident citizens.

The registration period commenced immediately following the announcement, running from 2 October 2025, until 20 November 2025 (midnight Beirut time). Eligible citizens (those born on or before 30 March 2005) are required to register their intent to vote at a specific Lebanese embassy or consulate in their country of residence.

The online platform, accessible via the Foreign Ministry's official website, requires applicants to provide personal details, verify their existing information on the electoral rolls, and upload mandatory documentation:

- A Lebanese identification document (ID card, valid or expired passport, or civil status record).
- A proof of residency outside Lebanon (e.g., residency permit, foreign ID, or foreign driver's license).

The platform was intended to clarify and accelerate the registration process, particularly in anticipation of a high turnout following the significant participation observed in the 2022 elections.

== See also ==
- 2022–2025 Lebanese presidential election
