= Lebanese diaspora =

Descendants of Lebanese immigrants

- World map of the Lebanese diaspora

Total population
- 1.2 million Lebanese citizens residing abroad, from a total of 4 to possibly 14 million of Lebanese origin

Languages
- Brazilian Portuguese, Spanish, French, English, Arabic, Armenian

Religion
- Christianity (mainly Maronite, Greek Orthodox, Melkite, Roman Catholic, Protestant), Islam (mainly Shia, Sunni, Sufi and Alawite), Druze, and Judaism

Lebanese diaspora refers to Lebanese immigrants and their descendants who emigrated from Lebanon to countries worldwide. There are more people of Lebanese origin (15.4 million) living outside Lebanon than within Lebanon (6 million). The Lebanese diaspora consists of Christians, Muslims, Jews, Druze, and Armenians. Lebanese Christians trace their origin to several waves of emigration, beginning with an exodus ensuing the 1860 Mount Lebanon conflict.

Under the Lebanese nationality law, diaspora Lebanese do not have an automatic right to return. Varying degrees of assimilation and a high degree of interethnic marriages in the diaspora communities, regardless of faith, have caused the lack of passage of Arab fluency to their children, while most consider themselves Lebanese. Factors that have contributed to Lebanese emigration include civil wars, foreign invasions of Lebanon, and political and economic crises.

== Demographics ==
Despite the lack of reliable figures, the diaspora is estimated to be around 4 to 14 million people, far more than the internal population of Lebanon of around 4.6 million citizens in 2020. According to other estimates, the number of Lebanese living outside the country is thought to at least double the number of citizens living inside, which means at least 8 million people. Of the diaspora, 1.2 million are Lebanese citizens.

Lebanese people registered abroad for the legislative elections
Contients	2018		2022		2026	
Contients	Pop.	%	Pop.	%	Pop.	%
Europe	24,113	35.62%	69,463 ▲	30.79% ▼	53,194 ▼	36.84%▲
North America	21,550	25.97%	55,431 ▲	24.57% ▼	34,397 ▼	23.82%▼
Asia	12,610	15.2%	56,310 ▲	24.96% ▲	28,655 ▼	19.84% ▼
Oceania	10,856	13.09%	20,661 ▲	9.16% ▼	11,009 ▼	7.62% ▼
Africa	6,328	7.63%	18,172 ▲	8.05% ▲	14,898 ▼	10.32% ▲
South America	4,183	5.04%	5,587 ▲	2.48% ▼	2,261 ▼	1.57% ▼
Total Lebanese population registered abroad	82,965	100%	225,624 ▲	100%	144,406 ▼	100%

== History ==
The Lebanese diaspora has always been a target to the Lebanese state to create institutional connection. In 1960, the World Lebanese Cultural Union was established under the authority of the President Fouad Chehab.

France has always been an important destination for the Lebanese diaspora, because Lebanon used to be administrated by the French after WWI and because the French language is massively spoken in Lebanon.

The Lebanese diaspora, while historically trade-related, has more recently been linked to the Lebanese Civil War, during which around 990,000 individuals fled Lebanon, with many Lebanese emigrating to Western countries. Because of the economic opportunities, many Lebanese have also worked in the Arab World, most notably Arab states of the Persian Gulf such as Saudi Arabia and Kuwait.

The Americas have long been a destination for Lebanese migration, with the Lebanese arriving in some countries at least as early as the nineteenth century. The largest concentration of Lebanese outside the Middle East is in Brazil, which has, according to some sources, at least 6 million Brazilians of Lebanese ancestry, making Brazil's population of Lebanese greater than the entire population of Lebanon. According to research conducted by IBGE in 2008, covering only the states of Amazonas, Paraíba, São Paulo, Rio Grande do Sul, Mato Grosso and Distrito Federal, 0.9% of white Brazilian respondents said they had family origins in the Middle East.

Besides Brazil, there are also large Lebanese communities in Argentina, the United States, Canada, Australia, New Zealand, the United Kingdom, Germany, Norway, and in the European Union member states. In addition, sizable Lebanese populations also exist in the United Arab Emirates and Singapore, as well as West Africa, particularly Ivory Coast and Ghana.

A law which was passed in 2008 permitted Lebanese abroad to vote in the Lebanese elections beginning in 2013.

== Lebanese diaspora in Africa ==
The Lebanese diaspora in Africa started in the late 19th century when the first migrants departed from Ottoman Mount Lebanon to find economic opportunities and escape political and sectarian tensions. During the early 20th century, there were two major migration waves: after World War I and during Lebanon’s civil war from 1975 to 1990 when thousands of people left the country to seek refuge abroad.

The number of Lebanese people in Africa is estimated to be about 450,000 with the majority of them residing in West and Central Africa in countries such as Côte d’Ivoire, Senegal, Ghana, Nigeria, and Sierra Leone. Contemporary estimates of the Lebanese population in West Africa are less precise than those from the mid-twentieth century, primarily due to the challenges many African nations face in conducting comprehensive censuses. It is currently estimated—though with considerable uncertainty—that the Lebanese population in West Africa, including individuals of mixed descent, numbers between 170,000 and 200,000, approximately half of this population reside in the Ivory Coast and Senegal. Côte d’Ivoire is home to a Lebanese population estimated at around 100,000, making it one of the largest Lebanese diasporic groups on the continent. Lebanese migration also expanded into Central Africa—especially in the Democratic Republic of Congo and Cameroon—and to a lesser extent into Southern Africa, where communities formed in South Africa and Angola.

After their arrival, the Lebanese quickly recognized areas in colonial economies where European merchants often monopolized large-scale trade and left smaller and local markets relatively unattended. This allowed them to establish their businesses, often in challenging and underserved areas that European merchants had neglected. Over time, Lebanese migrants experienced economic progress as they went from small businesses to establishing bigger businesses in textiles, construction, and retail sectors.

Their role during colonial times was significant. They often served as intermediaries between European colonial powers and local African populations to distribute imported goods and export raw materials. During the colonial period, French consulates and embassies sought to register Lebanese emigrants and use them as a tool to extend French influence. Generally, they held a middle-tier status within the racial and social hierarchies imposed by colonial powers. This position enabled them to benefit economically, but it also generated a resentment that is growing in recent years among local populations, who at times viewed Lebanese traders as complicit in the broader colonial exploitation of African resources and labor.

Culturally, Lebanese in Africa have preserved their cultural heritage through religious institutions, schools and social organizations. Maronite and Orthodox churches, as well as mosques for Muslim Lebanese, played key roles in preserving traditions and community ties. For instance, the Maronite church of Notre Dame du Liban in Dakar, Sengal functions not only as a place of worship but also as a symbol of Lebanese national identity. Over generations, many Lebanese still maintain their distinct cultural identities. Younger generations, born and raised in Africa, have often blended Lebanese customs with local cultural elements to form a hybrid identity that represents their original heritage and their current environment.

=== Lebanese traders in Africa ===
Small villages in Burkina Faso, between Bobo-Dioulasso and Nouna, have Lebanese-owned shops—each village has at least one or two. Lebanese traders strategically send Lebanese newcomers to various shops across West-African cities to learn the local language and understand the workings of regional commerce. In the initial phase, these newcomers assist their employers—often relatives—in trading goods. The employer not only mentors the newcomer but also provides him financial support, usually through a small investment. Many of these shop owners eventually grow into prominent entrepreneurs with expansive trade networks that reach into rural areas.

However, not all West African countries offered the same flexibility in trade regulations. For example, under President Modibo Keïta, Mali adopted a centralized economic policy in which the state played a dominant role. The government tightly monitored economic planning and progress, leaving little room for entrepreneurial freedom.

Similarly, Guinea, under the leadership of Sékou Touré, implemented a strict socialist policy with a closed, anti-capitalist economy. Private enterprise was strongly supervised, and opportunities for private economic activities were limited. Lebanese traders had to deal with these restrictive economic policies. As a result, many relocated to other African countries with more favorable economic environments. Their financial stability and strong trade networks allowed them move to new places and keep doing business, even when the economic environment was challenging.

Lebanese traders in Africa were highly motivated and faced significant social pressure not to fail in their business ventures. Economic success in Africa gave them a higher social status in Lebanon. The recruitment of new traders often began in Lebanon and extended outward to various parts of Africa. This structured recruitment, along with pressure from the community and strong business drive helped Lebanese trade keep growing across Africa.

== Lebanese diaspora in South America ==
The Lebanese diaspora in South America was formed in the last decades of the 19th century and the first of the 20th century. It was the at the beginning of the end to the Ottoman empire, along with the Tanzimat reform, segregation and exclusion towards Christians that started the waves of immigration to South America, in search of a better life and future. Many Lebanese intellectuals who could not publish in the old Arab world, found an outlet of freedom of expression in South America.

The reasons for immigrating to South America were the large Catholic population. Then as is today Christians are the majority in the continent, making it easy for Lebanese who were mainly Maronites, to find their place. As civil wars and conflicts subsided, there was a greater need for wealth and skilled working people. As it turned out, South America was a perfect hub for the diaspora to create flourishing communities. During the Lebanese civil war, more Lebanese chose to move to South America, creating a new future among the existing Lebanese community. In South America they are about 15 million of Lebanese descent, about half of them live in Brazil.

=== Luis Abinader ===
Luis Abinader, is a Dominican economist, businessman, and politician who has served as the 54th president of the Dominican Republic since 2020. He was the Modern Revolutionary Party candidate for President of the Dominican Republic in the 2016, 2020, and 2024 general elections.

=== Abdalá Bucaram ===
Abdala Bucaram, is an Ecuadorian politician and lawyer who was the 38th president of Ecuador from 1996 until his removal from office in 1997.

== Lebanese diaspora in Australia ==
The Lebanese diaspora in Australia began to form in the late 19th century and continues into the present. Immigration from 1880 onward was influenced by changes in immigration policy in the pre- and post-war periods. Between 1880 and 1947, Australia had less than two thousand Lebanon-born individuals, the majority of whom were Christian Lebanese. After the Six-Day War in 1967, the number of Lebanese migrants grew, reaching 33,000 in the 1976 Australian census. After 1990, the number of migrants reduced significantly as a result of Australia's shift in the 1980s towards a service-driven and knowledge-based economy left fewer opportunities in the industrial sector. According to the 2021 Australian census, the number of Lebanon-born individuals in Australia now exceeds 87,000. Most of the population resides in New South Wales and Victoria.

=== Lebanese religious communities in Australia ===
Prior to the Lebanese Civil War, migrants from Lebanon consisted of Christians. Those who emigrated during and after the Civil War were predominantly Muslim. Currently, 38.6 percent of Lebanese-born people in Australia are Muslims, with Sunnis at 34 percent and the remaining 2 percent Shiites. About 40 percent of the Lebanese-born in Australia are Catholics, with Maronites at 30 percent and 10 percent Melkite. The rest are made up of about 11 percent Antiochian Orthodox, along with smaller communities of Druze and Protestantism.

=== Lebanese newspaper in Australia ===
The four main Lebanese newspapers in Australia, published in Sydney, are El-Telegraph, An-Nahar, Al-Bairak, and El Herald. El-Telegraph, the oldest newspaper originating in 1970 founded by George Jabbour and Joseph Khoury, is politically neutral. In 1978, Peter Indary and Pater Maroun, shareholders of El-Telegraph newspaper, split ways and formed An-Nahar. An-Nahar, which initially leaned left politically, now has no particular political stance in their papers and features up to three pages highlighting community news and updates. In 1986, another change took place at El-Telegraph, resulting in Joseph Khoury launching Al-Bariak newspaper. Originally a Lebanese leftist newspaper, Al-Bairak now focuses largely on commercial, however some of its original political stance can still be seen in their work. El Herald, the most recently founded newspaper, is supported by the Lebanese Nationalist Movement and advocates for Lebanon’s national unity and independence.

== Business networks and economic effects ==
Lebanese diaspora is often viewed as one of the most successful and influential diasporas in the world. Many Lebanese entrepreneurs and business people worldwide have proved very successful in all kinds of sectors and contexts. Lebanese abroad are considered "rich, educated and influential." Remittances from Lebanese abroad to family members within the country were estimated at $8.9 billion in 2014 and accounted for 18% of the country's economy. However, there remains a great untapped potential for further collaboration and cooperation between the diaspora and the Lebanese in their home country. Foreign direct investment is below 7% of the GDP, and almost half the Lebanese population is in tertiary education.

Throughout its history, the Lebanese diaspora used the Lebanese identity to create strong networks to help its members out. Over the course of time, immigration has indeed yielded Lebanese "commercial networks" throughout the world. Lebanese migrants play an important role in assisting Lebanon and its people through financial support, touristic visits, starting businesses and trades.

In West Africa, dozens of Lebanese entrepreneurs have established diverse business concerns in Ivory Coast, Senegal, Nigeria, Cameroon, Burkina Faso and other countries, and are viewed as business dynasties contributing to the development of the local economies in the region.

== Lebanese festivals in the United States ==
St. John Maron Catholic Church in Orange County, California hosts an annual OC Lebanese Cultural Festival in June to celebrate Lebanese culture. The event includes live Arabic music, Mediterranean food, and drinks. In Washington DC, a Catholic Church, Our Lady of Lebanon Maronite Church, has their annual Lebanese festival with free entry. The 10-hour event includes live performances featuring traditional Lebanese dance and music, as well as Lebanese cuisine and beverages. Individuals can feel involved in the event by learning traditional Lebanese dances and taking part in raffles and other activities planned throughout the festival. The annual Lebanese American Festival is held at St. Sharbel Maronite Catholic Church in Las Vegas. In addition to live music and dance groups, the festival features prayers, food vendors and amusement rides to entertain attendees.

== Lebanese populations in the diaspora ==
Number of Lebanese people (including descendants) per country Lebanon + 1,000,000 + 100,000 + 10,000 + 1,000

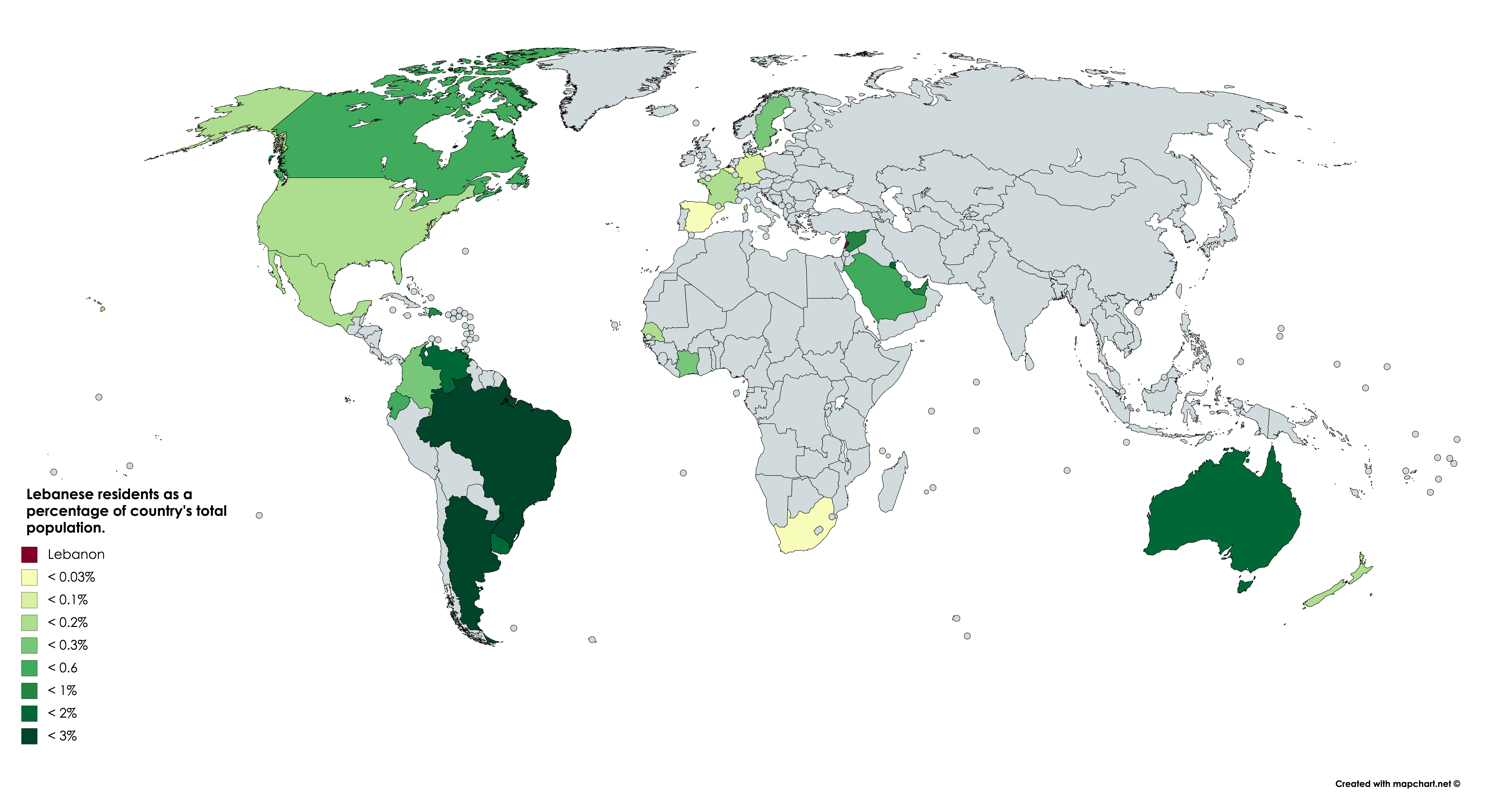
Lebanese residents as a percentage of country's total population

The list below contains approximate figures for people of full or partial Lebanese descent by country of residence, largely taken from the iLoubnan diaspora map. Additional reliable cites have been provided where possible. Additional estimates have been included where they can be cited; where applicable, these are used in place of the iLoubnan figures. The figure below uses the data from the list and calculates the amount of Lebanese residents as a percentage of the total population of the respective country.

Country	Estimate	Upper estimate	Region	Country article in English Wikipedia	List of personalities of Lebanese origin
Brazil	2,000,000 according to research conducted by IBGE in 2008, covering only the states of Amazonas, Paraíba, São Paulo, Rio Grande do Sul, Mato Grosso and Distrito Federal, 0.9% of white Brazilian respondents said they had family origins in the Middle East	5,800,000-7,000,000 (Brazilian/Lebanese governments)	Latin America	Lebanese Brazilian	Brazil
Argentina	1,200,000 – 3,000,000	3,200,000	Latin America	Lebanese Argentine	Argentina
Colombia	125,000 – 1,200,000	2,500,000	Latin America	Lebanese Colombian	Colombia
United States	440,279	450,000	North America	Lebanese American	United States
Venezuela	340,000	340,000	Latin America	Lebanese Venezuelan	Venezuela
France	300,000	375,000	European Union	Lebanese French	France
Australia	340,000	390,000	Oceania	Lebanese Australian	Australia
Canada	190,275	250,000 – 270,000	North America	Lebanese Canadian	Canada
Germany	147,000	ca. 200,000	European Union	Lebanese German	Germany
Saudi Arabia	1,200,000		Arab World	Lebanese people in Saudi Arabia	Saudi Arabia
Syria	105,000(citizenship) Around 4 to 9 millions by decent		Middle-East	Lebanese people in Syria	Syria
Ecuador	100,000	250,000	Latin America	Lebanese Ecuadorian	Ecuador
Ivory Coast	100,000	300,000	Sub-Saharan Africa	Lebanese people in Ivory Coast	
Mexico	600,000	620,000	North America	Lebanese Mexican	Mexico
Dominican Republic	80,000	500,000	Latin America	Arab Dominicans	
United Arab Emirates	80,000		Arab World	Lebanese people in the United Arab Emirates	United Arab Emirates
Uruguay	53,000	70,000	Latin America	Lebanese Uruguayan	Uruguay
Senegal	50,000	150,000	Sub-Saharan Africa	Lebanese Senegalese	
Kuwait	41,775	106,000	Arab World	Lebanese people in Kuwait	
Nigeria	30,000	30,000	Sub-Saharan Africa	Lebanese Nigerian	
Sweden	26,906		European Union	Lebanese people in Sweden	Sweden
Denmark	26,705		European Union	Lebanese people in Denmark	Denmark
DR Congo	25,000		Sub-Saharan Africa	Lebanese people in Democratic Republic of the Congo	Democratic Republic of the Congo
Qatar	25,000		Arab World	Lebanese people in Qatar	
Spain	11,820		European Union	Lebanese People in Spain	Spain
New Zealand	8,500		Oceania	Lebanese New Zealander	
Turkey	7,340		Eurasia		
South Africa	20,000	30,000	Sub-Saharan Africa	Lebanese people in South Africa	South Africa
Israel	3,500 (2021) (Note: The Lebanese community in Israel mostly consists of members of Antoine Lahad's Militia who continued to live in and receive salaries from the state of Israel since their group was disbanded in 2000.)		Middle East	Lebanese in Israel	
Sierra Leone	3,000	3,000	Sub-Saharan Africa	Lebanese people in Sierra Leone	
Liberia	3,000				
Belgium	2,400	5,000	European Union	Lebanese people in Belgium	Belgium
Caribbean (Note: Includes Cuba, Guadalupe & Haiti)	545,200		Latin America	Lebanese Jamaican	Caribbean · Cuba · Haiti · Jamaica
Rest of Latin America, ex. Caribbean (Note: Belize, Bolivia, Chile, Costa Rica, El Salvador, Guatemala, Honduras, Nicaragua, Panama, Paraguay, Peru)	181,800		Latin America	Lebanese Chileans	Chile · Dutch Antilles
Rest of GCC (Note: Excludes Saudi Arabia & Kuwait, includes Iraq & Jordan)	105,000		Arab World		
Rest of European Union (Note: Belgium, Cyprus, Greece, Italy, Monaco, Switzerland, United Kingdom)	96,781		European Union	Lebanese British · Lebanese Bulgarian** · Lebanese Greek	Bulgaria · · Germany · Italy · Monaco · Netherlands · Switzerland · UK
Scandinavia	108,220		European Union	Lebanese Swedish	Sweden · Denmark
Rest of Sub-Saharan Africa (Note: Burkina Faso, Gambia, Ghana, Liberia, Nigeria & Sierra Leone)	42,510		Sub-Saharan Africa	Lebanese Sierra Leonean	Ghana · Sierra Leone
North Africa (Note: Egypt, Libya & rest of North Africa)	14,000		North Africa	Lebanese Egyptian	Egypt
Asia (Note: Iran, Indonesia, and Philippines)	2,600		Asia		

Note: An important percentage of Middle-Easterners in Argentina, Brazil, Colombia, Mexico, Venezuela, Bulgaria, Romania, Italy, Portugal and Spain are of Lebanese ancestry. They are denoted ** for this purpose.

== Outreach to the Lebanese diaspora by the Lebanese government ==
The Lebanese government increasingly sees the diaspora as a critical resource for investment and new immigrants. A 2016 television ad tried to entice Lebanese in the United States to move to Lebanon to help improve the standard of living.

The Lebanese government launched the DiasporaID program in August 2017 to better connect Lebanese abroad to Lebanon itself. Funding for the project was provided by USAID with an objective of improving foreign investment in Lebanon.

On August 8, 2017, Lebanese President Michel Aoun advocated children of Lebanese in the diaspora take on Lebanese citizenship during a speech to the Maronite Diaspora Institution at Baabda Palace.

== Notable persons of Lebanese descent ==
Prominent Lebanese Figures وجوه من لبنان
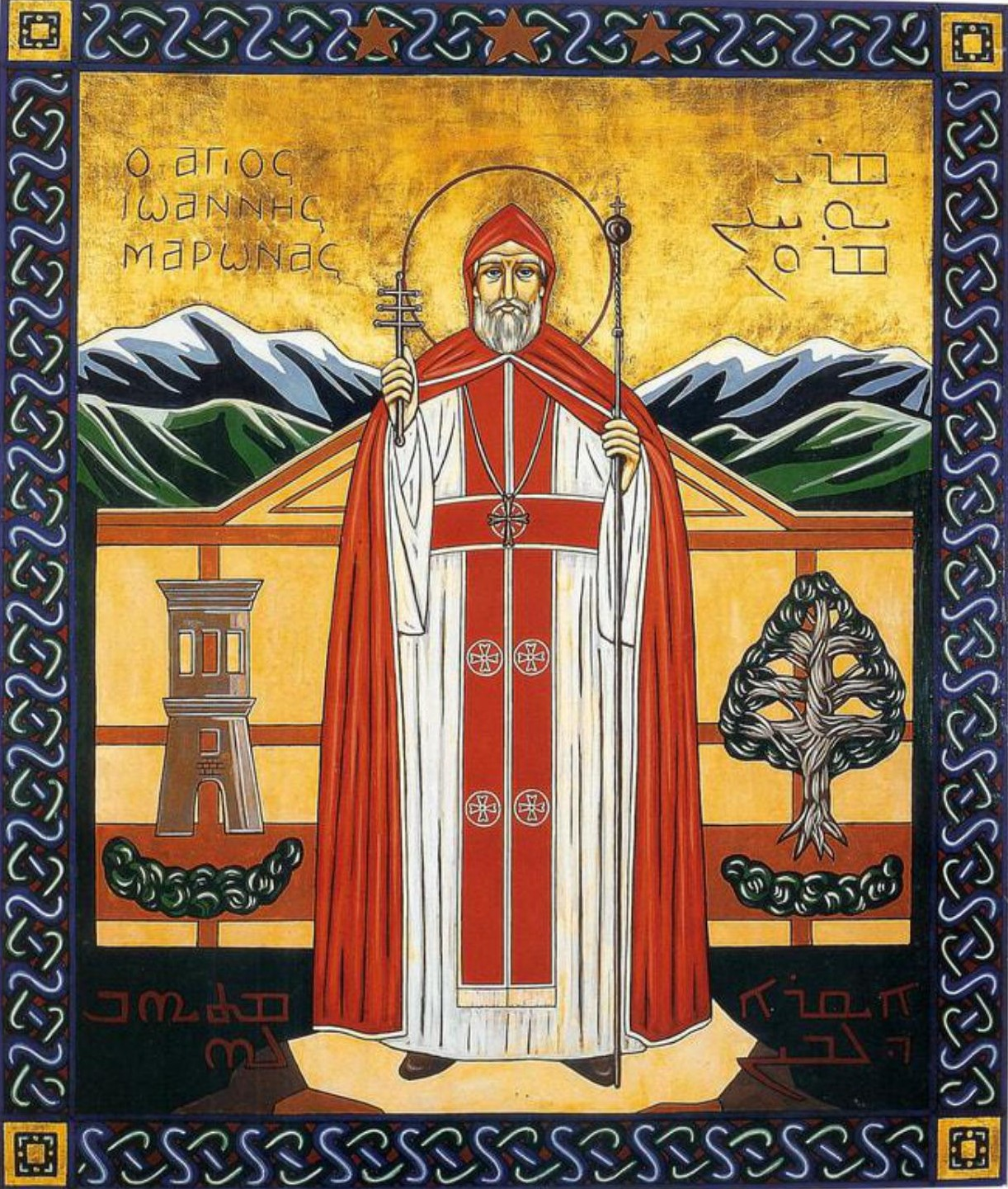
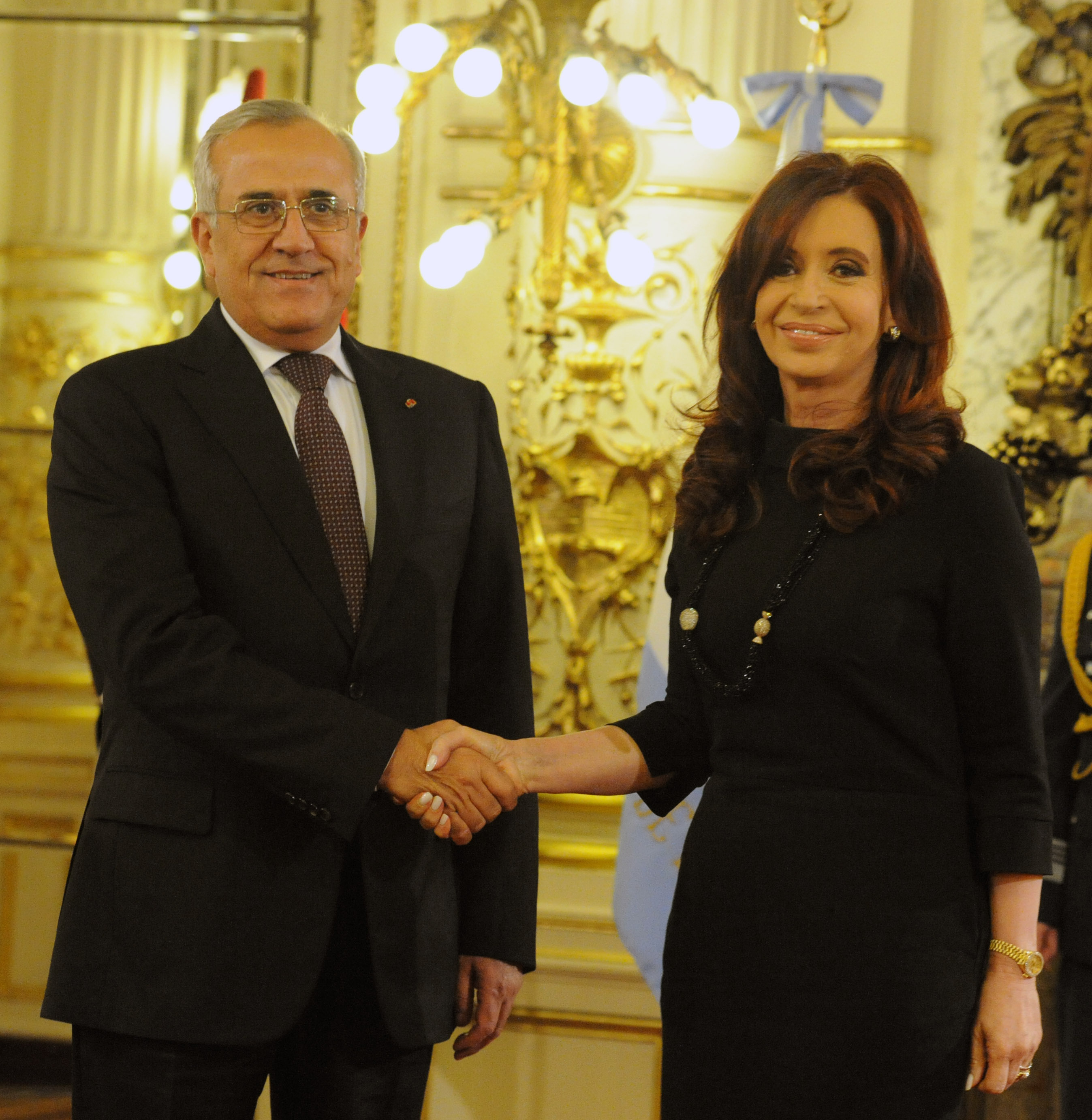
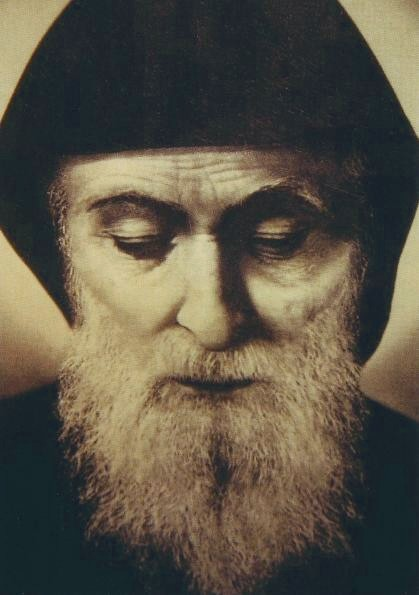
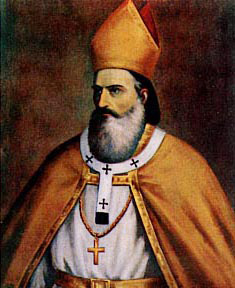
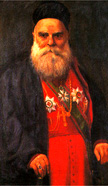
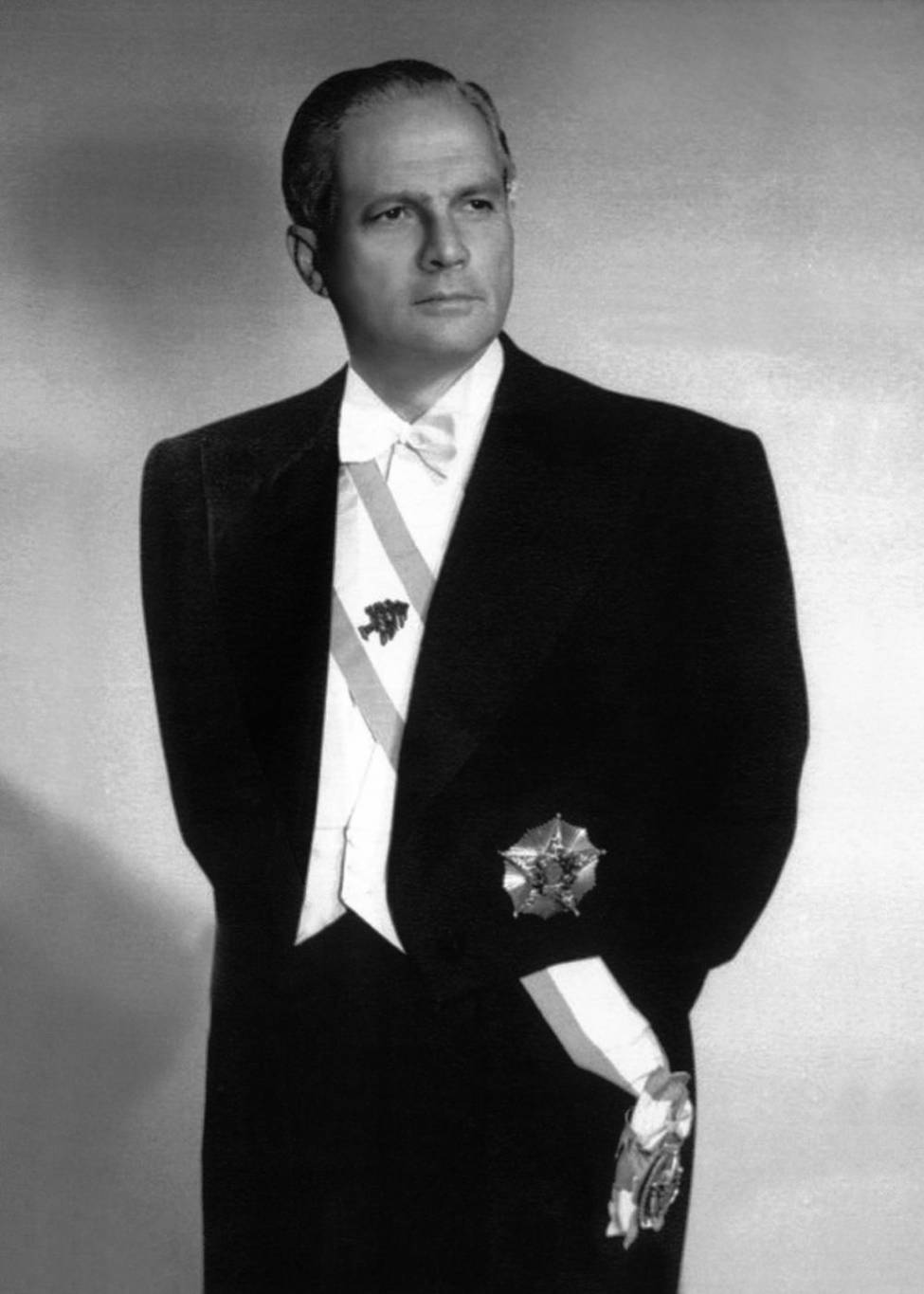
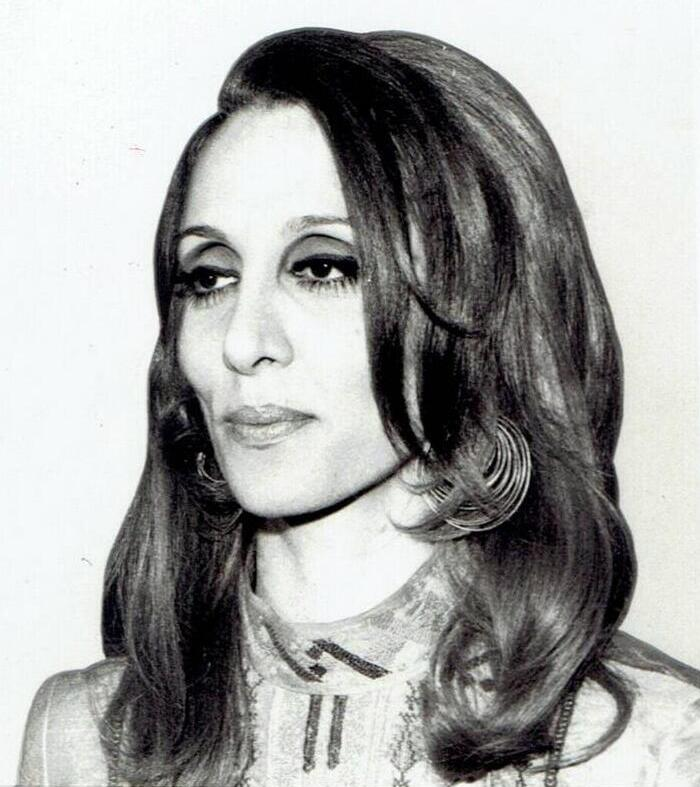
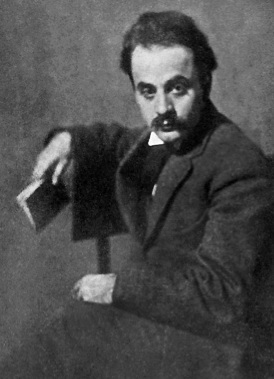
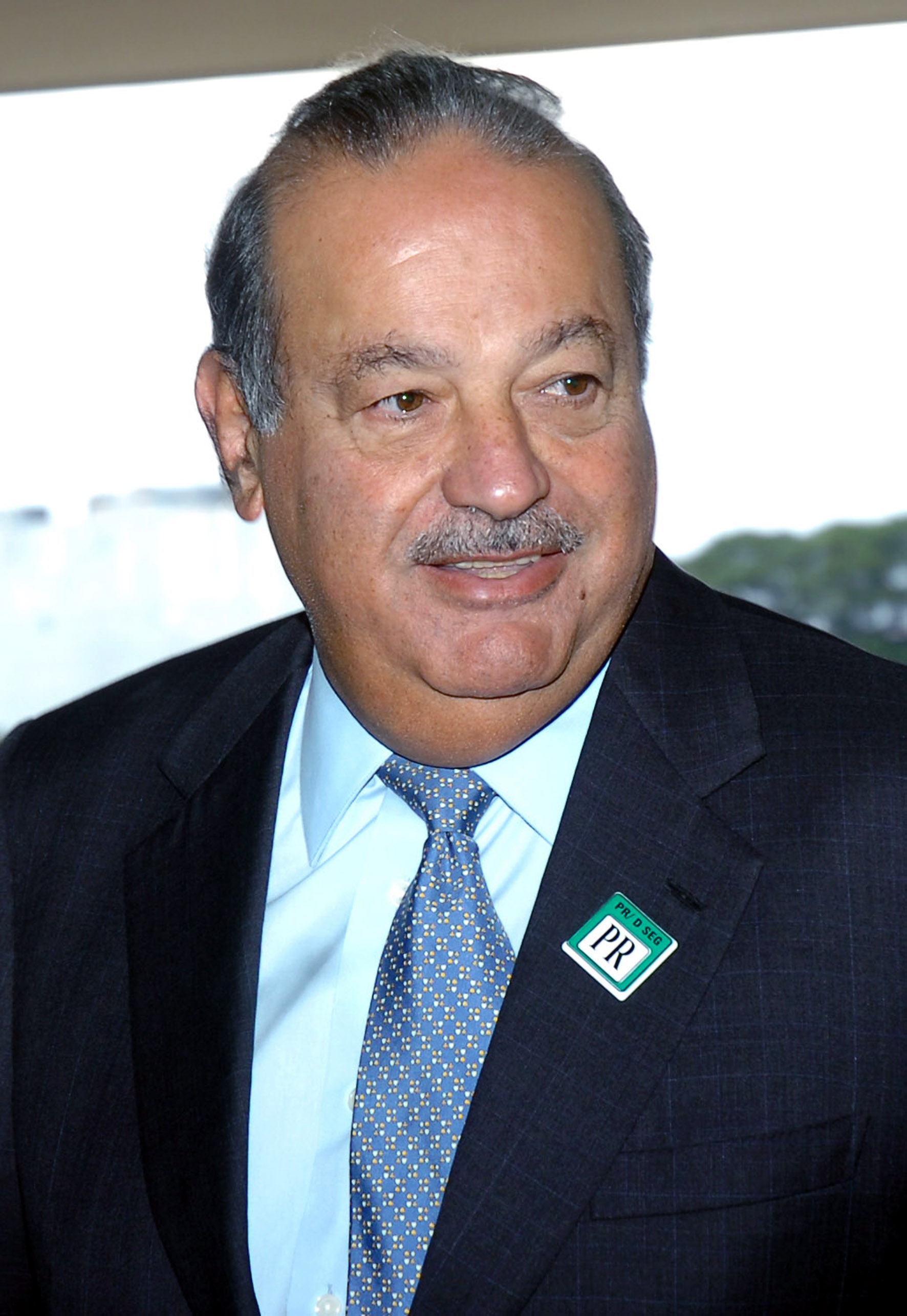
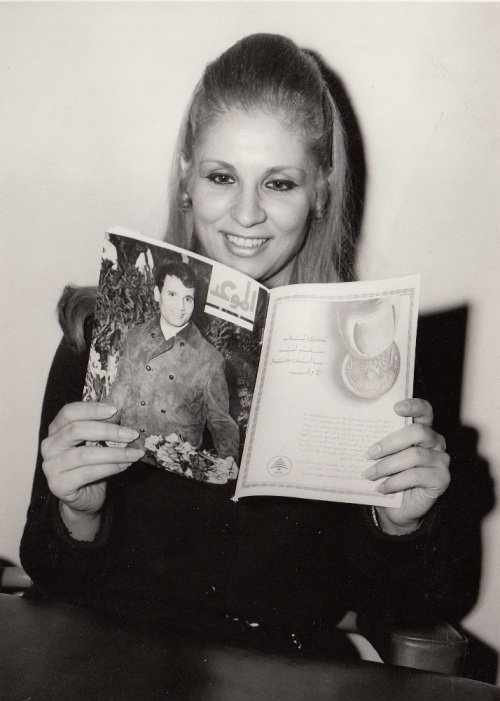
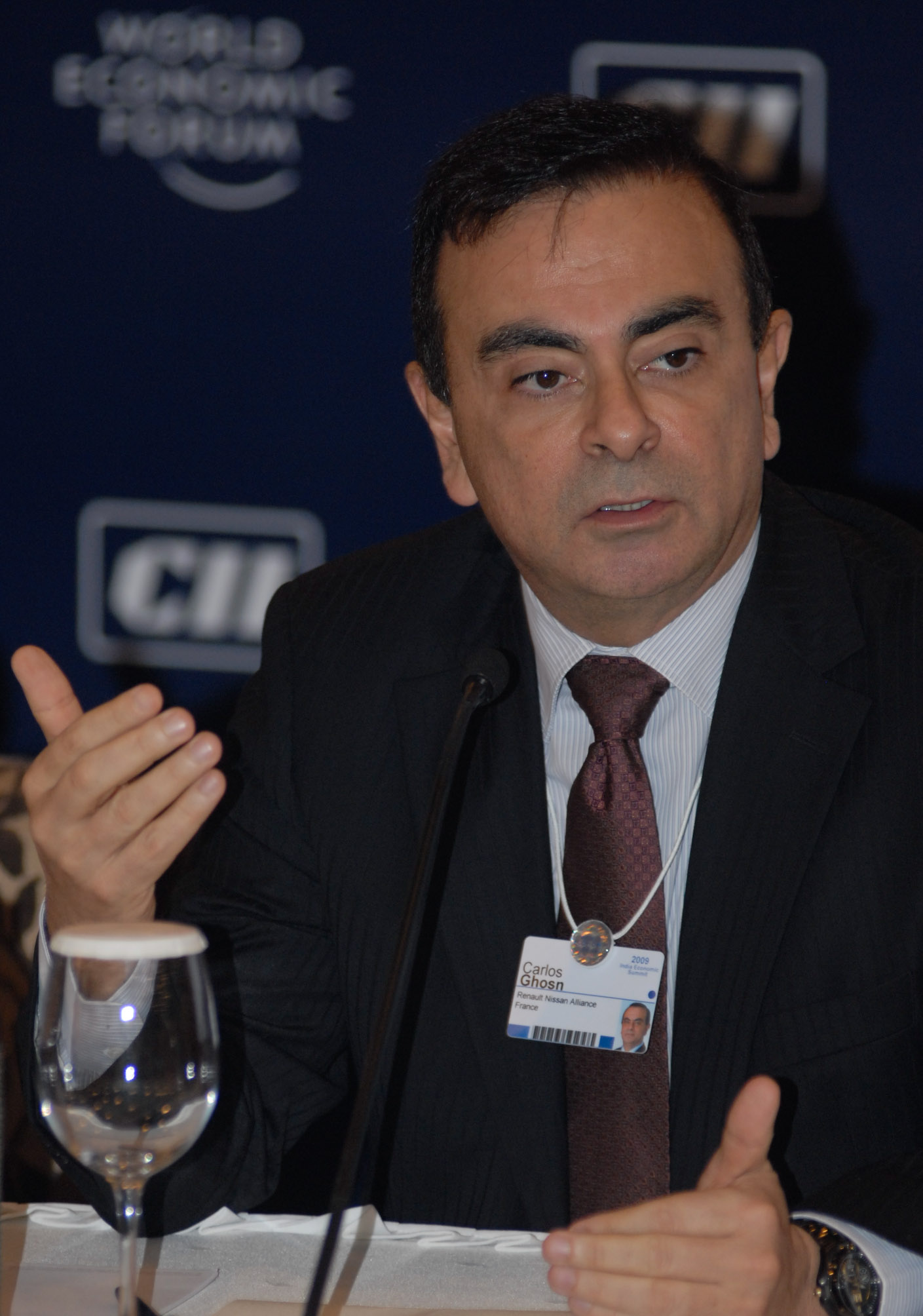
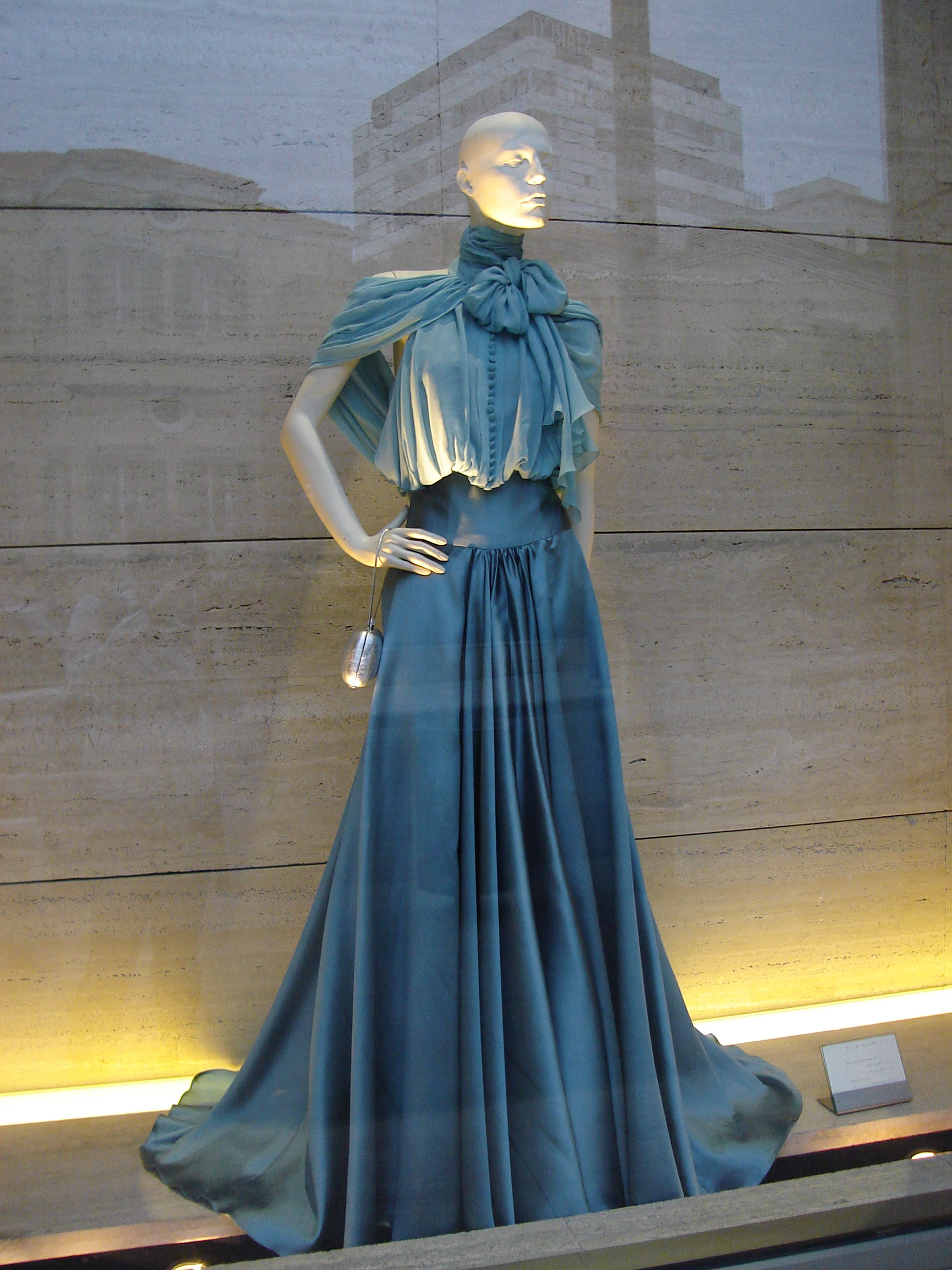
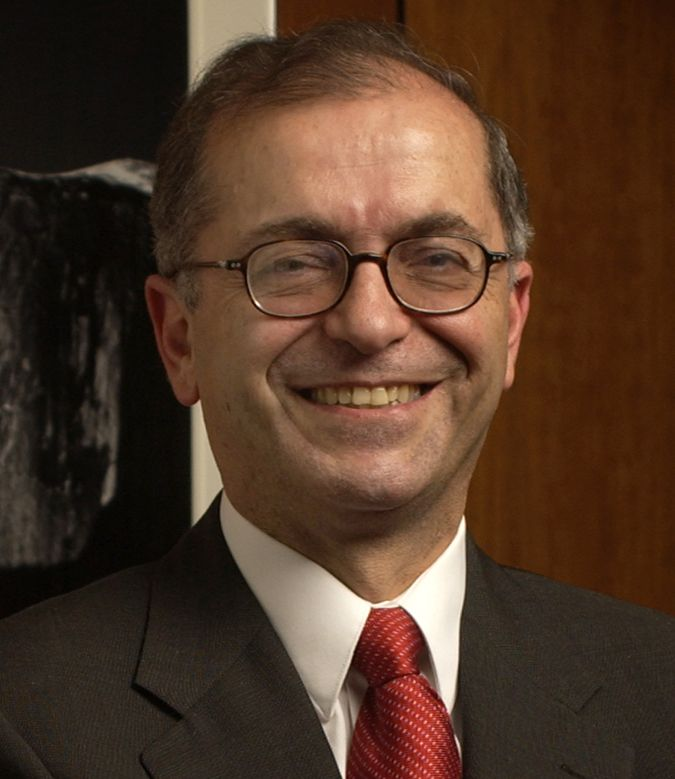
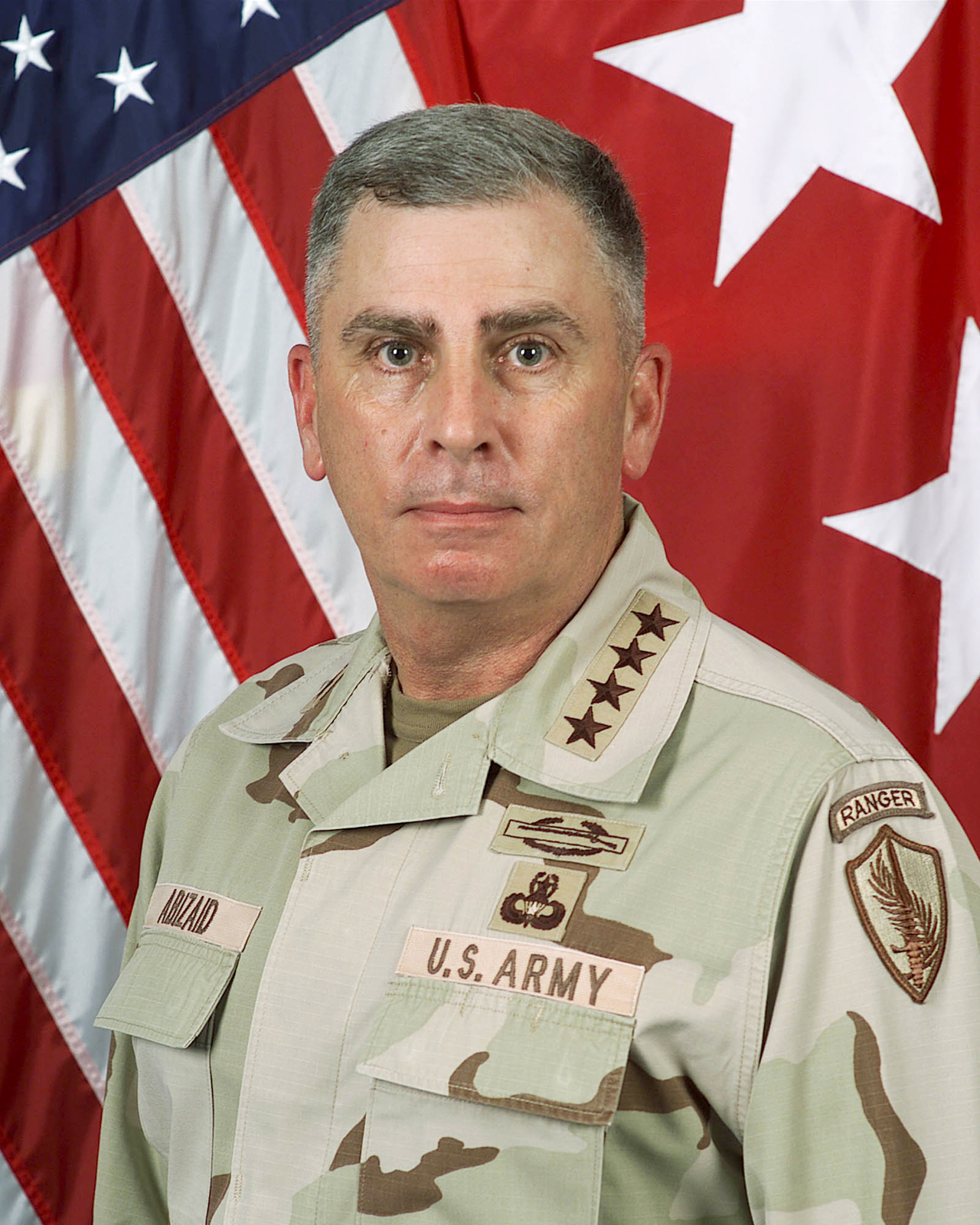
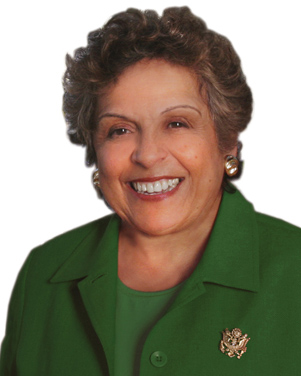
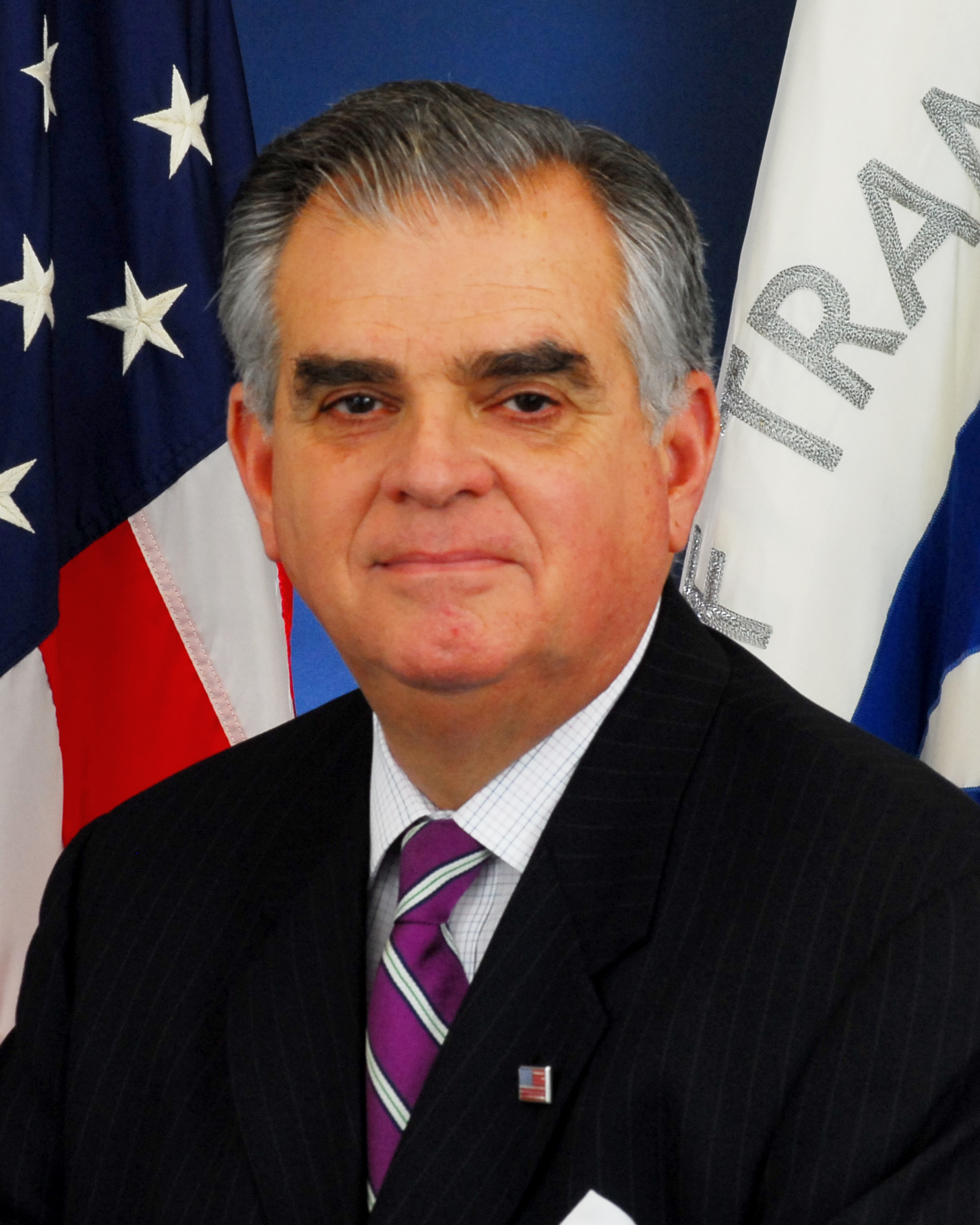
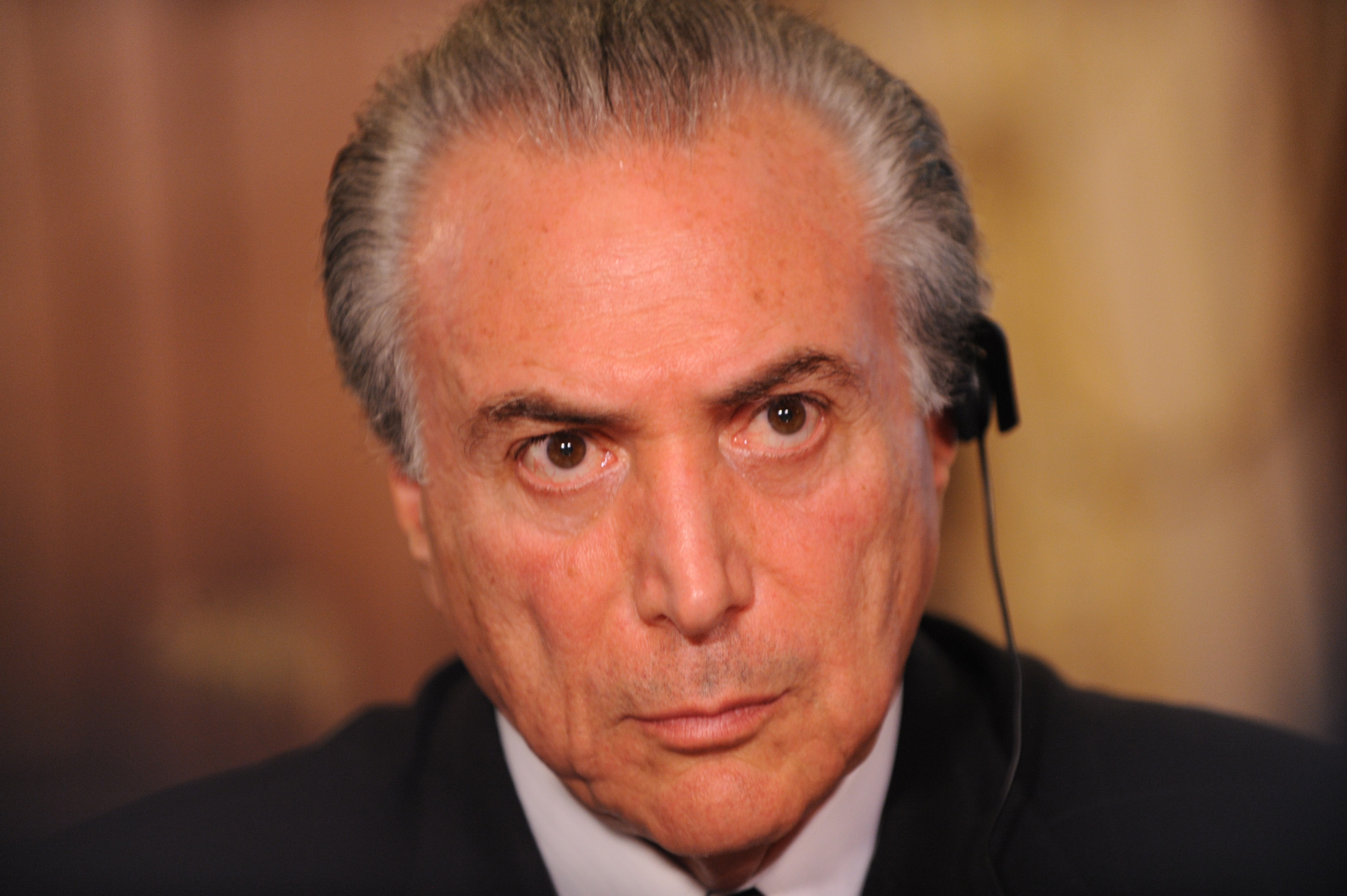
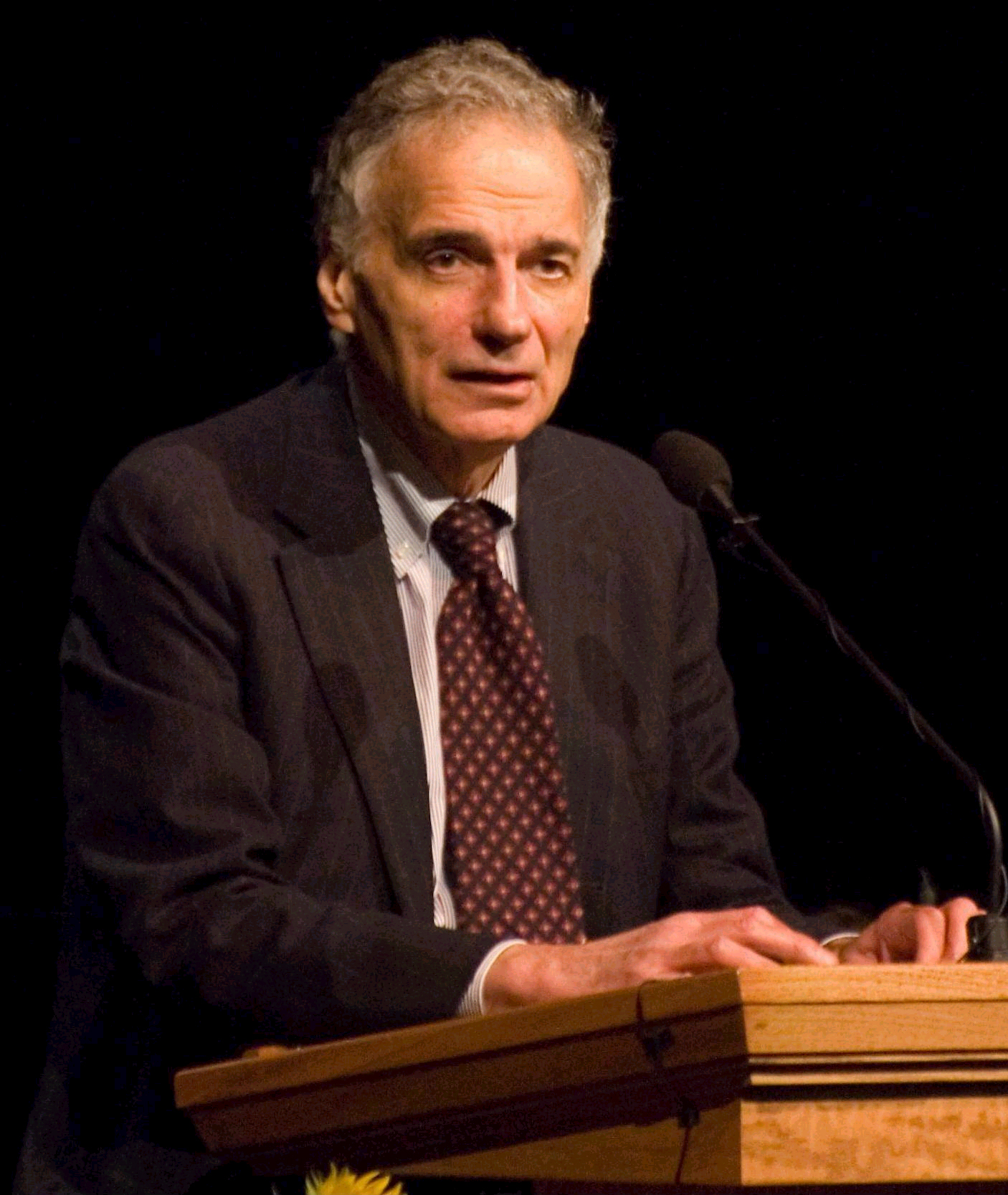
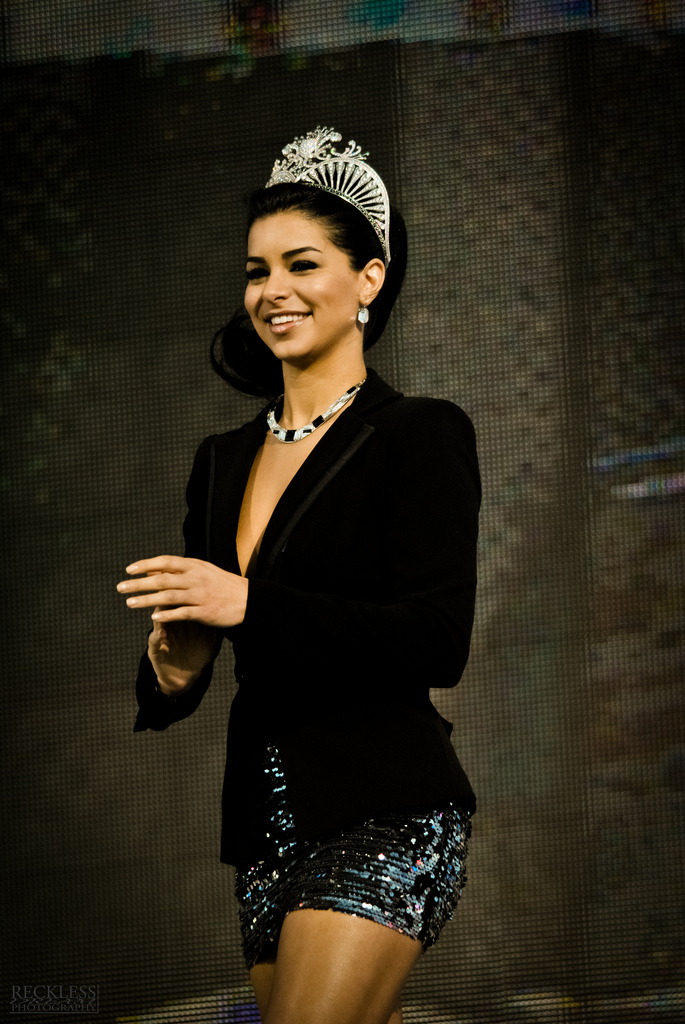
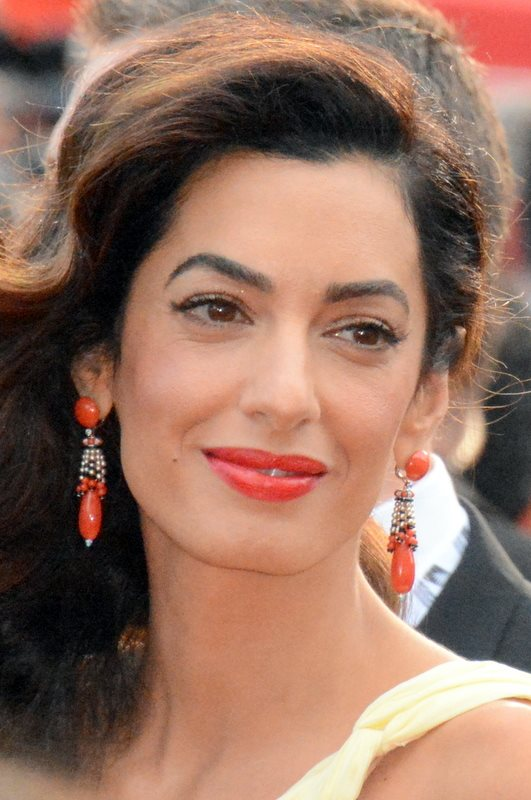
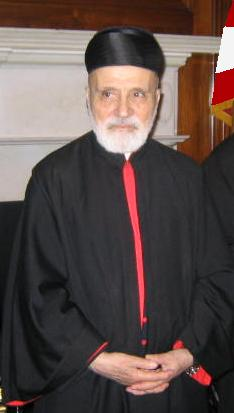
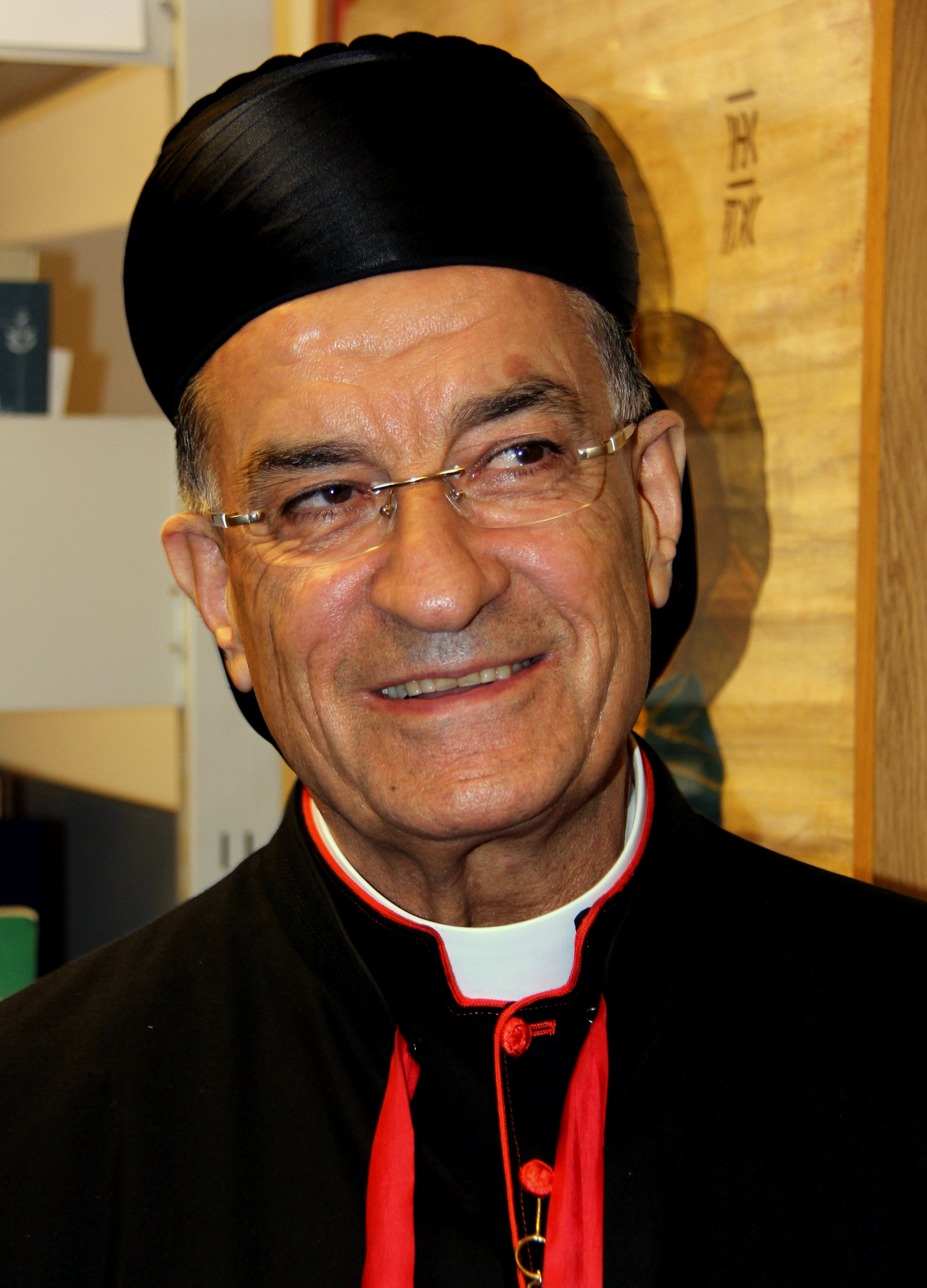
- Top row (left to right); Some of the figures are of Lebanese Descent, while others are Lebanese Citizens John Maron • Charbel Makhluf • Estephan El Douaihy • Elias Peter Hoayek • Youssef Bey Karam • Former Lebanese President Camille Chamoun • Fairuz • Khalil Gibran • Former Lebanese President Bachir Gemayel • Carlos Slim • Sabah • Carlos Ghosn • Elie Saab • Charles Elachi • John Abizaid • Etienne Saqr • Donna Shalala • Ray LaHood • Michel Temer • U.S. Presidency Candidate Ralph Nader • Miss USA 2010 Rima Fakih • Amal Clooney • Nasrallah Boutros Sfeir • Bechara Boutros al-Rahi • Lebanese President Michel Suleiman

Famous scientists of Lebanese descent include: Peter Medawar (Nobel Prize in Physiology and Medicine), Elias Corey (Nobel Prize in Chemistry), Ardem Patapoutian (Nobel Prize in Physiology or Medicine), Michael Atiyah (Fields Medalist, Mathematics), Michael DeBakey (medical innovator), Mona Nemer (Canada's Chief Science Advisor) and geneticists Huda Zoghbi, Anthony Atala and Joanne Chory. Famous writers include William Peter Blatty, Nelly Sfeir Gonzalez, film director Alex Garland, Nassim Nicholas Taleb and screenwriters and film producers Geoff Johns, Tony Thomas, Ronald Schwary, Tomas Langmann, Mario Kassar and Michael Tadross.

Prominent members of the Lebanese diaspora include Presidents and vice-presidents, e.g. Juan Lechin (Bolivia), Michel Temer (Brazil), Julio Teodoro Salem, Abdalá Bucaram, Alberto Dahik, Jamil Mahuad (all in Ecuador), Jacobo Majluta Azar, Luis Abinader (Dominican Republic), Julio Cesar Turbay (Colombia), Alberto Abdala (Uruguay) and Mario Abdo (former president of Paraguay). Other famous politicians include Ralph Nader, 2000, 2004 and 2008 US presidential candidate, Alex Azar former United States Secretary of Health, Spencer Abraham former United States Secretary of Energy, Mark Esper former United States Secretary of Defense, John Sununu former White House Chief of Staff, Darrell Issa US politician, George J. Mitchell US Politician and Peace Envoy, Charlie Crist Governor of Florida, Philip Habib US Politician and Peace Envoy, Victoria Reggie Kennedy American lawyer and diplomat, politician and author Jeanine Pirro, US Representative Donna Shalala, US Representative Ray Lahood, Governor of São Paulo State in Brazil Paulo Maluf, Edward Seaga Prime Minister of Jamaica and Benjamin Miguel Harb Bolivian politician and lawyer.

Notable military and astronauts include US army general John Abizaid, Navy Seal and Medal of Honor recipient Michael Monsoor as well as astronaut and Congressional Space Medal of Honor recipient Christa McAuliffe. Computer scientists include Richard Rashid, Tony Fadell and Jean Paoli.

Businessmen of Lebanese descent include Carlos Slim Helú, Carlos Ghosn, Nicolas Hayek, John J. Mack, Jacques Nasser, Debra Cafaro, Joseph J Jacobs, Joe Jamail, Swiss-Lebanese banker Salim Sfeir, Swiss-Brazilian banker Edmond Safra, Mauricio Gonzalez Sfeir, Lucie Salhany, Kevin O' Leary, Marcus Lemonis, Canadian industrial psychologist Gad Saad, and famous names in entertainment like Danny Thomas, Marlo Thomas, Salma Hayek, Shakira, Jenna Dewan, Terrence Malick, Tom Shadyac, Tony Shalhoub, Kathy Najimy, Tiffany, Jim Backus, Jane Wiedlin, Kristy McNichol, Zoe Saldaña, James Stacy, Catherine Keener, Vince Vaughn, Amy Yasbeck, Khrystyne Haje, Skandar Keynes, Jace Norman, Morena Baccarin, Barbara Mori, Omar Sharif, Ricardo Darin, Xavier Dolan, Damian Bichir, Paul Anka, Emilio Stefan, Drake's long time producers and Grammy winners Noah "40" Shebib and Oliver El-Khatib, Alfredo Bojalil, Oscar-winning composer Gabriel Yared, guitarists Dick Dale, Tommy Bolin and G. E. Smith, Armand Van Helden, Tyler Joseph, Jack Barakat, Bazzi, Thomas Rhett, Patrick Gemayel, comedian el Gran Sandy, Uruguayan actress Dahd Sfeir, Mika, models Yamila Diaz-Rahi, Daniella Sarahyba and Zaira Nara; Miss Universe Bolivia Lenka Nemer, and sportsmen like Doug Flutie, Rony Seikaly, Marcos Bagdhatis, Sammy Giammalva, professional tennis player and coach, Patrick Maroon, Johnny Manziel, surfers Kelly Slater and Maya Gabeira, winner of the Indy 500 Bobby Rahal, Carlos Alberto captain of Brazil 1970 world cup champion, FIFA World Cup record holder Mario Zagallo, Bolivian national goalkeeper Jose Issa, chess Grandmaster Jennifer Shahade and Olympic medalists Jordyn Wieber, Florencia Habif, Matt Abood, Thaisa Daher and Beatriz Haddad Maia, top-10 woman tennis professional.

== Lebanese food in the diaspora ==
Lebanese cuisine has ingrained itself as a staple in a multitude of cultures, wherever people from the Lebanese diaspora emigrated. Examples include Brazil, Canada and the United States. The language of food can contribute to feelings of cultural belonging, as shown through literary analysis. It has served as both a source of identity and income for people of the Lebanese diaspora everywhere around the world.

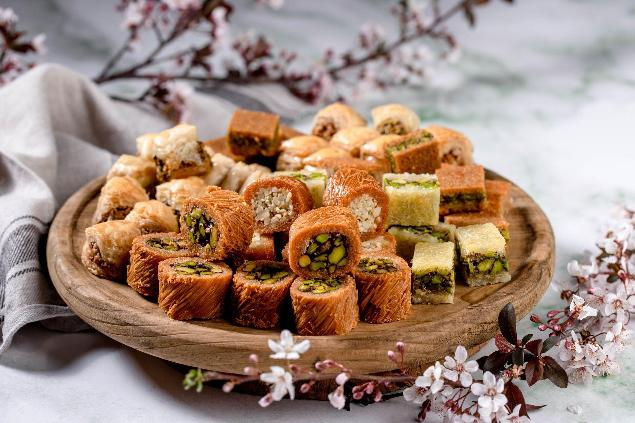
Hallab baklava

== See also ==
- Arab diaspora
- Constitution of Lebanon
- Dearborn, Michigan
- Driving licence in Lebanon
- Foreign relations of Lebanon
- History of Lebanon
- Lebanese Argentines
- Lebanese Brazilians
- Lebanese identity card
- Lebanese passport
- Levantine Arabic
- List of Lebanese diaspora
- List of Lebanon international footballers born outside Lebanon
- List of Lebanese people
- Little Syria, Manhattan
- Politics of Lebanon
- Vehicle registration plates of Lebanon
- Visa policy of Lebanon
- Visa requirements for Lebanese citizens

== External links and further reading ==
- Arab American National Museum
- Hage, Ghassan. (2021). The Diasporic Condition: Ethnographic Explorations of the Lebanese in the World. University of Chicago Press.
- Kusumo, Fitra Ismu. Islam en América Latina. Tomo I: La expansión del Islam y su llegada a América Latina [Islam in Latin America, Volume I: The Expansion of Islam and Its Arrival in Latin America]. Rumah Jade Production, 2013.
- Kusumo, Fitra Ismu. Islam en América Latina. Tomo II: Migración Árabe a América Latina y el caso de México [Islam in Latin America. Volume II: Arab Migration to Latin America and the Case of Mexico]. Rumah Jade Production, 2013.
- Kusumo, Fitra Ismu. Islam en América Latina. Tomo III: El Islam hoy desde América Latina [Islam in Latin America, Volume III: Islam Today from Latin America]. Kindle ed., Rumah Jade Production, 2013.
- The Lebanese Demographic Reality Lebanese Information Center, reviewed by Statistics Lebanon. 14 January 2013.
- Moise A. Khayrallah Center for Lebanese Diaspora Studies at North Carolina State University
- Verdeil, Éric, & Dewailly, B. (2019). International Migration and the Lebanese Diaspora. In E. Verdeil, G. Faour, & M. Hamzé (Eds.), Atlas of Lebanon (1–). Presses de l’Ifpo. https://doi.org/10.4000/books.ifpo.13224.
