= List of Lebanese people in Syria =

This is a list of notable individuals born in Syria of Lebanese ancestry or people of Lebanese and Syrian dual nationality who live or lived in Syria.

== Arts ==
- Colette Khoury - novelist and poet
- Hazem Sannib - painter and photographer

== Religion ==
- John X of Antioch - priest
- Raymond Eid - priest

== Politics ==
- Fares al-Khoury - politician and statesman

== Sports ==
- Agop Donabidian - footballer

== See also ==
- List of Lebanese people
- List of Lebanese people (Diaspora)
- Lebanese people in Syria
