= List of Lebanese people in Spain =

This is a list of notable individuals born in Spain of Lebanese ancestry or people of Lebanese and Spanish dual nationality who live or lived in Spain.

== Musicians ==
- Chenoa, singer with Lebanese maternal grandmother

== Politicians ==
- José María Benegas, Lebanese-Jewish politician

== Sports ==
- Noel Jammal, European F3 Open Championship driver
- Miguel Layún, Mexican footballer with dual Spanish citizenship is of Lebanese descent
- Roberto Merhi, Spanish racing driver of Lebanese-Brazilian origin

== Translators ==
- Miguel Casiri, Arabic–Latin translator and Arabic–Spanish translator

== Visual Artists ==
- Douglas Abdell, Sculptor

== See also ==
- Lebanese people in Spain
- List of Lebanese people
- List of Lebanese people (Diaspora)
