= Lebanese people in Spain =

Lebanese people in Spain Libaneses en España
Total population
- 11,820

Regions with significant populations
- Madrid, Barcelona, Sevilla, Valencia, Palma de Mallorca

Languages
- Spanish, Arabic

Religion
- Christianity and Islam

Related ethnic groups
- Lebanese people, Lebanese diaspora, Lebanese Americans, Lebanese Argentines, Lebanese Brazilians, Lebanese Canadians, Lebanese Mexicans, Lebanese Colombians

Lebanese people in Spain (Spanish: Libaneses en España) are people from Lebanon or those of Lebanese descent, who live in the country of Spain. Most of the Lebanese people in Spain are expatriates from Lebanon but also there is a sizable group of people with Lebanese descent from Latin American countries with sizable Lebanese diasporas like Argentina, Colombia, Ecuador, Venezuela, Mexico, Uruguay, Chile, Paraguay and Brazil.

== Notable people ==
- Miguel Casiri
- Yamila Diaz
- Noel Jammal
- José María Benegas
- Roberto Merhi
- Shakira
- Chenoa

== See also ==
- Lebanon–Spain relations
- List of Lebanese people in Spain
- Arabs in Spain
- Arabs in Europe
- Lebanese diaspora
