= List of Lebanese people in Sweden =

This is a list of notable individuals born in Sweden of Lebanese ancestry or people of Lebanese and Swedish dual nationality who live or lived in Sweden.

== Business and commerce ==
- Samir Brikho - businessman; former Chief Executive of Amec Foster Wheeler

== Film, performing, and visual arts ==
- Alexander Abdallah - actor and filmmaker
- Fares Fares - actor
- Josef Fares - film director
- Nour El-Refai - film actress and comedian
- Rebecca Stella Simonsson - blogger, TV host, designer and artist

== Musicians ==
- Emilè Azar - singer who took part in Melodifestivalen in 2007
- Rabih Jaber - singer; member of band Rebound!
- Ralana - musician of Palestinian origin
- Maher Zain - Islamic singer
- Elias Zazi - musician/composer of Assyrian origin

== Politics ==
- Roger Haddad, politician, member of the Riksdag (2010–2022, 2026–present)

== Sports ==
- Mouhammed-Ali Dhaini - footballer
- Alexander Michel Melki - footballer
- Felix Michel Melki - footballer
- Mohamed Ramadan - footballer

== See also ==
- Lebanese in Sweden
- List of Lebanese people
- List of Lebanese people (Diaspora)
