= Lebanese people in Qatar =

Total population
- 25,000 - 40,000

Regions with significant populations
- Doha

Languages
- Arabic (Lebanese Arabic), English, French

Religion
- Christianity and Islam

Lebanese people in Qatar have a population exceeding 25,000 Lebanese people form one of the largest community of non-citizen Arabs in Qatar. In addition, an increasing number of Lebanese students seeking education and career opportunities opted for the country in light of its relatively reputable institutions across the Middle East. Most of the Lebanese people in Qatar live mainly in the capital city of Doha.

== Lebanese people in Qatar ==
- Ahmed Omar

== See also ==
- Lebanese diaspora
- Armenians in Qatar
