= Lebanese people in the United Kingdom =

Total population
- 15,935 Lebanese-born (2011 Census); 90,000 total (2018 estimate)

Regions with significant populations
- London, South East England, Birmingham, Liverpool, Manchester

Languages
- English, Arabic and French

Religion
- Maronite, Greek Orthodox, Shiite, Druze, Sunni, Protestant

Lebanese people in the United Kingdom include people originating from Lebanon who have migrated to the United Kingdom and their descendants.

== History and settlement ==
Although there has been sporadic migration from the Middle East to Britain since the 17th century, the real growth of the UK Lebanese population began in 1975, with the start of the civil war in Lebanon which drove thousands of people away. The exodus was aggravated in 1982 with the Israeli invasion.

== Demographics ==
The 2001 UK Census recorded 10,459 Lebanese-born people. The 2011 census recorded 15,341 people born in Lebanon residing in England, 228 in Wales, 314 in Scotland and 52 in Northern Ireland. However, the number including those not born in Lebanon has been estimated to be around 90 thousand, according to Arab News in 2018.

Edgware Road in London is one of a number of areas that the Lebanese community has settled in and has shops selling Arabic newspapers, books and music. Other areas with Lebanese communities in London include Bayswater, Kensington and Westbourne Grove.

== See also ==
- Lebanon–United Kingdom relations
- British Arabs
- Arabs in the United Kingdom
- Arabs in Europe
- Lebanese diaspora
