= Ralana =

Musical artist

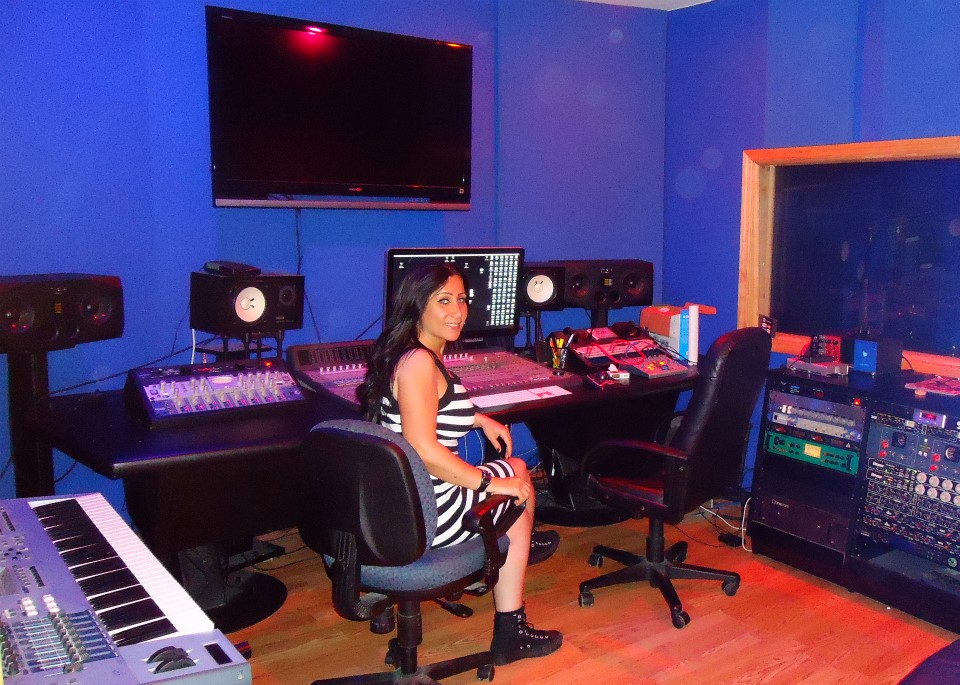
- Swedish musician Ralana in a recording studio
- Born: Fadia Dirawi; December 28, 1975 (age 50); Beirut, Lebanon
- Other name: Lana
- Occupations: Singer songwriter record producer dj
- Years active: 2005–present
- Musical career
- Genres: EDM; Electro house; Trap; R&B
- Labels: Xlency Records; Spinnin' Records

Fadia Dirawi (born December 28, 1975), more known by her artistic name Ralana, is a Swedish singer, songwriter, record producer and DJ. Dirawi is also the CEO and founder of Xlency Records.

Ralana began her music career singing mediterranean music, but in 2014 she branched out to more worldwide genres with the single “Struck By Lightning”. A year later she was #1 on the ReverbNation’s EDM global chart-toppers, with the single “Money Talks” which was picked up for distribution by the Dutch label Spinnin' Records. In 2015 she also partnered with Zo Baren and recorded “Toi et Moi” which charted in the Middle East and North Africa. Her single "When The Sun" which been released June 8, 2018 has peaked #2 on stockholm Edm charts just few days after the release date. On June 13, 2019 Ralana dropped her newest album "Badass vibes" content of 12 songs 10 original and two remixes, with “We Need Love” song Ralana hit the EDM chart #2.

== Early life ==
Ralana was born on December 28, 1975, in Beirut, to Palestinian parents who immigrated in the 1980s to Sweden, where she grew. Ralana studied "Commerce and Administration" at Värnhemsskolan in Malmö than she study TV and video production in Skurup Folkhögskolan. As a kid, she dreamed of being an artist.

== Career ==
Upon finishing her graduation, Ralana started a career in the Swedish television, as a broadcaster, before deciding to pursure a music career. In 2005 she released her debut single, called "Taqleaa", the song was released on Kelma one collection by Egyptian record label "Kelma Music Production". In 2007, Ralana released her debut album, called "Meen Kal". A music video for the song "Ma Testahilneesh" was released to promote the album and was aired at Alam El Phan's music channel Mazzika. "Meen Kal" was distributed by ARM Records. In 2010, she released another single called "Zalan Menny". These releases reached commercial success in the arab world, leading the artist to appear in several TV programs, magazines, newspapers' articles and a movie. In 2014, she started an international career, more focused on electronic music. In the same year, she released her first single "Struck by Lightning". In the following year, she released the song "Toi et moi", a partnership with Algerian-born musician ZO Baren. The single charted in Middle East and North Africa, and was executed on commercial radios in several territories including Paris, Dubai and Beirut. "Toi et moi" was followed by the solo single, "Money talks", produced by SkyeLab Music Group. The single topped the EDM ReverbNation's charts in Sweden and also globally. Due to its success, the single was picked for distribution by Dutch record label Spinnin' Records. On June 8, 2018, Ralana released her single "When The Sun", the song peaked #2 on the Stockholm EDM charts.

On June 13, 2019, Ralana released her newest album titled "Badass Vibes", content of 12 songs 10 original and 2 remixes, with “We Need Love” song Ralana hit the EDM chart #2.

== Personal life ==
Ralana is also known by her nickname, Lana. Many journalists, friends and even her family calls her simply, Lana. Due to her multi-ethnic background, she can speak Arabic, English and Swedish fluently. Ralana has a twin brother.

== Discography ==
=== Studio albums ===
- Meen Kal (2007)
- Badass Vibes (2019)

=== Singles ===
- Taqleaa (2005)
- Zalan Menny (2010)
- Struck by Lightning (2014)
- Toi et moi (2014)
- Money talks (2015)
- When the Sun (2018)
