= Lebanese people in Syria =

- (Lebanon) (Syria)

Total population
- 105,000 (before the Syrian civil war); Unknown (today)

Regions with significant populations
- Mostly Damascus & Aleppo.; Also Yabroud, Al-Zabadani, Homs, Hama, Latakia, Tartus.

Languages
- Arabic & French.

Religion
- Islam (Shia/Sunni) & Christianity (Greek Orthodox, Melkite Catholic, Maronite Catholic).

Related ethnic groups
- Lebanese diaspora

The Lebanese people in Syria are people from Lebanon, or those of Lebanese descent, who live in the country of Syria.

== Background ==
On 1 September 1920, France reestablished Greater Lebanon after the Moutasarrifiya rule removed several regions belonging to the Principality of Lebanon and gave them to Syria. The exact population of Lebanese people in Syria is quite difficult to define. In terms of social consequences, the division of Bilad al-Sham presented many dilemmas for its inhabitants. For example, up until 1950, many Lebanese who were born before 1920 considered themselves Syrians Many who were considered Lebanese by the French mandate worked as Syrian educators, businessmen, traders, etc. and did not distinguish themselves from the Syrians as such. As to border lines, they were fictitious in the eyes of the population, especially for those who were living on one side or the other of the border. Hence, an extended family, tribe or clan, found itself divided by such lines, placing one part of the family within Syrian territory, and the other part within Lebanon. In addition, there are several towns and villages inhabited by a community of some 15,000 Lebanese Shiites who have lived for decades on the Syrian side of a frontier that is not clearly demarcated in places and not fully controlled by border authorities. They are mostly Lebanese citizens, though some have dual citizenship or are only Syrian citizens.

== Religious affiliations ==
The Lebanese people of Syria are mostly Lebanese Shia Twelver Muslim and Lebanese Christian (Greek Orthodox, Melkite, Maronite) with a minority that belongs to Sunni Islam in Lebanon.

More specifically, most Lebanese people within the territory of Syria belong to either Twelver Shia Islam, Maronite or Greek Orthodox Christianity.

In Damascus there are Lebanese Twelvers living near to the Shia pilgrimage sites, especially in the al-Amara-quarter which is near to Umayyad Mosque and Sayyidah Ruqayya Mosque, and around Sayyidah Zaynab Mosque. Another important site is Bab Saghir Cemetery. The Shia Twelvers in Syria have close links to the Lebanese Shi'a Twelvers. Twelver Shias are also found in villages in Idlib, Homs and Aleppo provinces. More specifically, the Lebanese Shiite enclave on the Syrian side of the border is near the central city of Homs and across from Hermel, a predominantly Shiite region of northeastern Lebanon.

As a result of the Syrian Civil War many Lebanese people from Syria, mainly dual citizens of Lebanon and Syria, returned and continue to return to Lebanon. Many of these are dual citizens from the so-called “Lebanese villages”, predominantly Shiite villages just inside Syria, where the villagers are said to hold Lebanese citizenship. Also, Lebanese Shias try to defend the area around the holy Shiite shrine of Sayida Zeinab, named for the granddaughter of Islam's Prophet Muhammad's, south of Damascus. The conflict around these border areas with Lebanese minority populations is used to increase the Syrian Civil War spillover in Lebanon.

== See also ==
- List of Lebanese people in Syria
- Lebanese diaspora
- Lebanon–Syria relations
- Syrians in Lebanon
