= List of Dutch people of Lebanese descent =

This is a list of notable individuals born in the Netherlands, including the overseas constituent countries of Aruba, Curaçao, and Sint Maarten and the now defunct Netherlands Antilles (Bonaire, Saba and Sint Eustatius), of Lebanese ancestry or people of Lebanese and Dutch dual nationality who live or lived in the Netherlands.

== Politicians ==
- Abdul Nasser El Hakim - Curaçaoan businessman, politician and Minister of Economic Affairs
- Emily de Jongh-Elhage - former Prime Minister of the Netherlands Antilles

== See also ==
- Demographics of the Netherlands
- List of Dutch people
- List of Lebanese people
- Lebanese diaspora
