= Lebanese people in Kuwait =

Total population
- 41,775 - 106,000

Regions with significant populations
- Kuwait City

Languages
- Arabic (Lebanese Arabic), English, French

Religion
- Christianity and Islam

Lebanese people in Kuwait have a population exceeding 41,775 and other estimates report a total of 106,000 Lebanese in Kuwait. Lebanese people form one of the largest community of non-citizen Arabs in Kuwait. In addition, an increasing number of Lebanese students seeking education and career opportunities opted for the country in light of its relatively reputable institutions across the Middle East. Most of the Lebanese people in Kuwait live mainly in the capital city of Kuwait City.

== Lebanese people in Kuwait ==
- Samir Atallah
- Mouna Ayoub
- Diana Haddad
- Wadih el-Hage
- Abdalla El-Masri
- Rabih Haddad
- Ahmed Al-Tarabulsi

== See also ==
- Arab diaspora
- Lebanese diaspora
- Armenians in Kuwait
