= Lebanese Belgians =

Lebanese-Belgians
Total population
- 8,000 (2006 est.)

Regions with significant populations
- Belgium (Brussels and Antwerp); Lebanon

Languages
- Lebanese Arabic, French and Dutch

Religion
- Islam, Christianity and Atheism

Related ethnic groups
- Lebanese people, Lebanese diaspora

Lebanese people, who come from various religious and ethnic groups, form a distinct community in Belgium as part of the global Lebanese diaspora. It was estimated in 2006 that there were 8,000 Belgians who identified as Lebanese in terms of origin or descent. More recent estimates put their numbers at only 3,500. The majority are Belgian citizens and live in major cities such as Brussels and Antwerp. In addition, it was reported the same year that 1,200 were living in Lebanon. They sometimes refer to themselves as Belgo-Libanais in French or Belgisch-Libanees in Dutch.

Although small in contrast to the much larger Moroccan and Turkish communities, the different ethnic and religious groups from within Lebanon are represented in Belgium. This includes a significant Maronite Christian community which traces its origin to traders who settled in Belgium during the 19th century. Some Maronites are involved in the trade of diamonds in the Antwerp diamond district. Restaurants serving Lebanese cuisine exist in numerous Belgian towns and cities. A small Lebanese community existed in the Belgian Congo before its independence in 1960.

The Arab European League was founded by Dyab Abou Jahjah, Lebanese-Belgian activist, as a Pan-Arabist political group in Belgium which is a vocal exponent of Palestinian nationalism. It was criticised for participating in violent racist and antisemitic demonstrations in Antwerp in 2002. The 2006 Lebanon War was reported to have brought different ethnic and religious denominations within the community together. Around 20 Lebanese-Belgian men are believed to have travelled to Lebanon through Libya in 2006 to fight against Israel. Mohammad Bazzi, a Belgian-Lebanese, has been accused of being a "key financier" of Hezbollah.

The Belgian-Lebanese community held small demonstrations in Brussels in sympathy with the 2019–2020 Lebanese protests in November 2019. It also organised humanitarian aid to be sent to Beirut in the aftermath of the 2020 Beirut explosion.

== Notable people ==
- Dyab Abou Jahjah (b. 1971), Pan-Arabist political activist and polemicist
- Khalil Sehnaoui (b. 1975), hacker and internet security consultant

== See also ==
- Islam in Belgium
- Lebanese people in France
- Lebanese people in Germany
- Lebanese people in the Netherlands
