= Lebanese people in Denmark =

Total population
- 28,485

Regions with significant populations
- Aarhus, Copenhagen, Odense, Aalborg

Languages
- Arabic (Lebanese Arabic), French, Danish

Religion
- Christianity and Islam

Related ethnic groups
- Lebanese people, Lebanese diaspora

Lebanese people of Denmark (Arabic: اللبنانيون في الدنمارك, romanized: al-Lubnānīyūn fī al-Danmārk) are people from Lebanon or those of Lebanese descent who live in the country of Denmark. The majority of Lebanese people came to Denmark in the 1970s and 1980s, either escaping the Lebanese Civil War or for economic reasons. Per 1 October 2016, 26,404 persons in Denmark were of Lebanese origin.

== Demographics ==
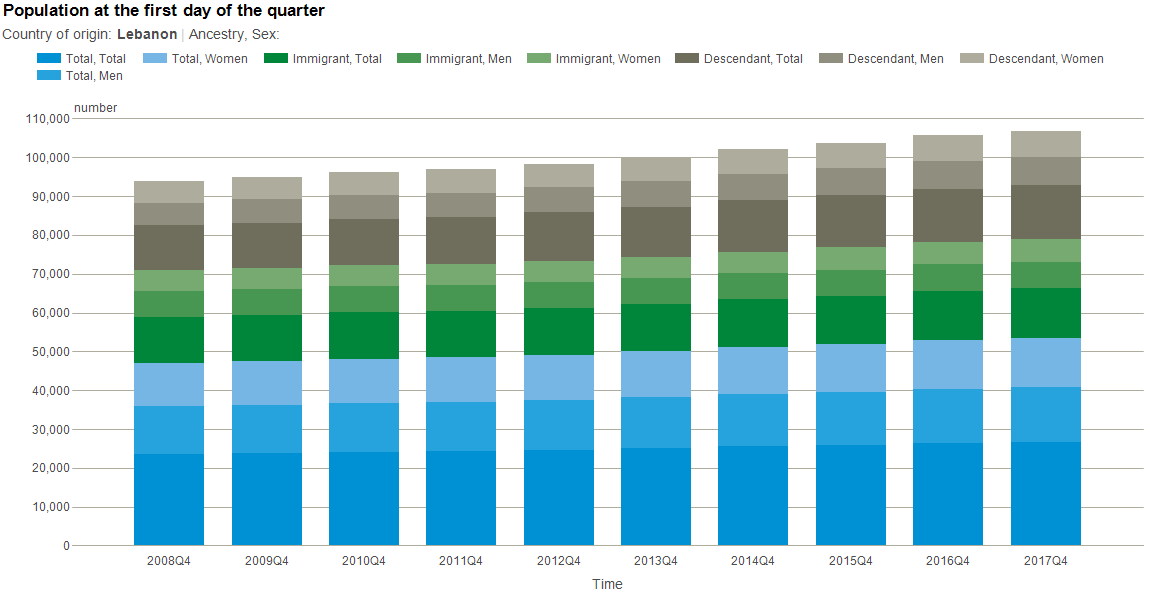
Population of Lebanese origin in Denmark by sex, yearly fourth quarter 2008-2017 (Statistics Denmark).

According to Statistics Denmark, as of 2017, there are a total 26,705 persons of Lebanese origin living in Denmark. Of those individuals, 12,800 are Lebanon-born immigrants and 13,905 are descendants of Lebanon-born persons. 1,379 individuals are citizens of Lebanon (591 men, 788 women).

As of 2016, a total of 29 Lebanon-born persons have been granted residence permits in Denmark for family reunification, 10 for asylum, 2 for EU/EEA residing family members, and 1 for other reasons. Lebanese residents are generally young, with most belonging to the 20–24 years (3,566 individuals), 15–19 years (3,132 individuals), 10–14 years (2,620 individuals) and 25–29 years (2,572 individuals) age groups. According to data from the fourth quarter of 2025, the total population of Lebanese origin in Denmark is 28,474. These residents are generally young to middle-aged, with the largest age groups being 30–34 years (3,547 individuals), then 25–29 years (3,387 individuals), 20–24 years (3,066 individuals) and finally 35–39 years (2,384 individuals)

Distribution of lebanese people in Denmark by age groups (2025)
1. 0-19 (18.7%)
2. 20-64 (75.2%)
3. 65-100 (6.13%)

Number of Lebanese people residing in Denmark across the years:

| Years | Immigrants | Descendant | Total | Growth (%) |
|---|---|---|---|---|
| 2008 | 12,017 | 11,456 | 23,473 | —N/a |
| 2009 | 12,010 ▼ | 11,715 ▲ | 23,725 ▲ | +1.06% ▲ |
| 2010 | 12,068 ▲ | 11,984 ▲ | 24,052 ▲ | +1.36% ▲ |
| 2011 | 12,005 ▼ | 12,214 ▲ | 24,219 ▲ | +0.69% ▼ |
| 2012 | 12,062 ▲ | 12,526 ▲ | 24,588 ▲ | +1.50% ▲ |
| 2013 | 12,151 ▲ | 12,855 ▲ | 25,006 ▲ | +1.67% ▲ |
| 2014 | 12,332 ▲ | 13,191 ▲ | 25,523 ▲ | +2.02% ▲ |
| 2015 | 12,491 ▲ | 13,416 ▲ | 25,907 ▲ | +1.48% ▼ |
| 2016 | 12,733 ▲ | 13,671 ▲ | 26,404 ▲ | +1.88% ▲ |
| 2017 | 12,800 ▲ | 13,905 ▲ | 26,705 ▲ | +1.13% ▼ |
| 2018 | 12,922 ▲ | 14,099 ▲ | 27,021 ▲ | +1.17% ▲ |
| 2019 | 12,987 ▲ | 14,275 ▲ | 27,262 ▲ | +0.88% ▼ |
| 2020 | 13,092 ▲ | 14,447 ▲ | 27,539 ▲ | +1.01% ▲ |
| 2021 | 13,235 ▲ | 14,632 ▲ | 27,867 ▲ | +1.18% ▲ |
| 2022 | 13,368 ▲ | 14,747 ▲ | 28,115 ▲ | +0.88% ▼ |
| 2023 | 13,387 ▲ | 14,794 ▲ | 28,181 ▲ | +0.23% ▼ |
| 2024 | 13,497 ▲ | 14,859 ▲ | 28,356 ▲ | +0.62% ▲ |
| 2025 | 13,555 ▲ | 14,919 ▲ | 28,474 ▲ | +0.41% ▼ |
| 2026 (Q1) | 13,542 ▼ | 14,925▲ | 28,467 ▼ | -0.02% ▼ |
| 2026 (Q2) | 13,548 ▲ | 14,937▲ | 28,485 ▲ | +0.06% ▲ |
| 2026 (Q3) | 13 551 ▲ | 14 953▲ | 28 504 ▲ | +0.06% ▲ |
Source: Statistics Denmark

== Socioeconomics ==
According to Statistics Denmark, as of 2014, Lebanon-born immigrants aged 30–64 in Denmark have an employment rate of approximately 31.9%. Lebanon-born individuals aged 16–64 also have a self-employment rate of around 17%.

According to Statistics Denmark, as of 2016, among Lebanon-born adults aged 30–59 in Denmark, around 61% of men and 75% of women live full-time in public housing units. This is because many arrived via family reunification or as refugees, and such immigrants usually settle in government-owned properties. Lebanese primarily inhabit the regions of Hovedstaden (9,777), Midtjylland (6,285), Syddanmark (5,607), Sjælland (3,578), and Nordjylland (1,458), and the cities of Aarhus (5,030), Copenhagen (4,959), Odense (2,756), and Aalborg (1,017).

According to Statistics Denmark, as of 2016, male immigrants from Lebanon aged 20–59 have an annual income of around 250,000 Danish krone before taxation. Most of that income comprises earned income, with the remainder consisting of public transfers, investment income and second income. As of 2017, a total of 11,464 persons of Lebanese origin in Denmark received public benefits. Of these individuals, the government funds were primarily allocated toward disability pension (3,687), the Danish State Education Grant and Loan Scheme Authority (2,990 persons), social benefits (2,782 persons), net unemployment (743 persons), subsidized employment (464 persons), guidance and activities upgrading skills (334 persons), maternity benefits (245 persons), job-based sickness benefits (195 persons), persons receiving holiday benefits (19 persons), and early retirement pay (6 persons).

== Employment ==
According to Statistics Denmark, as of 2014, Lebanon-born immigrants aged 30–64 in Denmark have an employment rate of approximately 31.9%. Lebanon-born individuals aged 16–64 also have a self-employment rate of around 17%.

== Education ==
According to the Danish Institute for Local and Regional Government Research, in the 2012 Programme for International Student Assessment (PISA), Lebanese pupils constituted 10% of the student population in Denmark. They obtained PISA scores of 421 in mathematics (Matematik), 428 in reading (Læsning), 401 in science (Naturfag), and 422 in problem-solving (Problem-løsning). Of the most frequent countries of origin for students examined by the PISA, these were among the lowest scores in all categories. As of the 2015 PISA, Lebanese pupils represent 9% of Denmark’s student population. Their scores have decreased in each of the examined PISA categories except math, scoring 399 in science (399 when unadjusted for socioeconomic status), 404 in reading (405 unadjusted), and 434 in mathematics (434 unadjusted). These PISA scores are generally in the lower range of the most frequent countries of origin for students.

== Notable people ==
See List of Lebanese people in Denmark

== See also ==
- Iraqis in Denmark
- Syrians in Denmark
- Arabs in Denmark
- Lebanese people in Sweden
- Immigration to Denmark
