= List of Lebanese people in Denmark =

This is a list of notable individuals born in Denmark of Lebanese ancestry or people of Lebanese and Danish dual nationality who live or lived in Denmark.

== Politics ==
- Asmaa Abdol-Hamid, social worker and politician
- Ahmed Akkari, political activist

== Athletes ==
- Wassim El Banna, footballer (soccer)
- Bassel Jradi, footballer (soccer)
- Ahmed Khaddour, boxer

== See also ==
- Lebanese people in Denmark
- List of Lebanese people
- List of Lebanese people (Diaspora)
