= Hazem Sannib =

Syrian artists (born 1976)

- Born: September 16, 1976 (age 49); Kuwait
- Education: Fine Arts workshops (Syria and Norway)
- Known for: Dreamalism movement
- Notable work: Paintings of God's names, door of Kaaba, golden Mecca
- Style: Digital art work, Arabic and Western arts
- Spouse(s): Kira Camilla Kavli (children: Josef, Shadia, Ayoub H.)
- Website: www.sannib.art

Hazem Sannib (Arabic: حازم صنيب; born September 16, 1976, in Kuwait) is a Syrian painter and photographer. He is the creative director and founder of Sannib Arts and The Kavli Advertising Ltd in Kuwait. Sannib is known for creating the Dreamalism movement, a new art concept and contemporary paintings using oil and acrylic colors.

== Life and work ==
Sannib is a Syrian contemporary artist born to a Syrian father and a Lebanese mother. He’s currently living in London. Sannib started painting at the age of 10 with no prior lesson nor technique. From 1997 to 1998, he took his first figurative and abstract painting lessons with Syrian painter Fared Jorgeuos. Sannib participated in his first art exhibition in 1994 in Kuwait and later with the Syrian Artist Group Exhibition in Homs, Syria in 1998. From 2001 to 2002, Sannib lived in London, UK where he took additional painting lessons and improved his technique and style. In 2006, he experimented with abstract themes and acrylic painting under the guidance of Mard Issa, a Norwegian classical painter and author who inspired him. Sannib's work focus on digital art, Islamic and Western art and around humanitarian and contemporary themes. The concept of "Dreamalism" is his signature style and a movement he started in 2014. According to him, Dreamalism is for the preservation of the aspirations and dreams of people longing for liberation, prosperity, freedom of expression and speech. He is known for his paintings of God's names, the door of Kaaba and the golden Mecca. His most recent creation is a digital Islamic art that combines graphic design and fine art.

== Selected exhibitions ==
Date	Location	Nature
February 2012	Parallax Art Fair, Chelsea Town Hall (London)	Collective exhibition
2011	Bu Gallery (Kuwait)	Collective exhibition
December 2011	The studio at PM Gallery (London)	Solo exhibition
December 2010	London Art Case Exhibition	Collective exhibition
2008	Al Raya Complex (Kuwait)	Collective exhibition
1995	Homs Art Association (Syria)	Collective exhibition
