= Miguel Casiri =

Spanish academic and orientalist (1710–1791)

- Born: 1710; Tripoli, Lebanon (formerly in Ottoman Syria)
- Died: 1791 (aged 80–81); Madrid, Spain
- Education: Studied at Rome
- Occupations: Maronite, Orientalist, Librarian
- Known for: Bibliotheca Arabico-Hispana Escurialensis

Miguel Casiri (Arabic: الاب مخايل الغزيري; Mikhael Ghaziri) (1710–1791) was a learned Maronite and Orientalist.

== Biography ==
He was born in Tripoli, Lebanon (formerly in Ottoman Syria). He studied at Rome, where he lectured on Arabic, Syriac, Aramaic, philosophy and theology. Together with Joseph Assemani he participated in the famous Lebanese Council of 1736 at the monastery of Our Lady of Luwayza.

In 1748 he went to Spain and was employed in the royal library at Madrid. He was successively appointed a member of the Royal Academy of History, interpreter of oriental languages to the king, and joint-librarian at the Escorial. In 1763 he became principal librarian, a post which he appears to have held till his death in 1791.

Casiri published a work entitled Bibliotheca Arabico-Hispana Escurialensis (2 vols., Madrid, 1760–1770). It is a catalogue of more than 1800 Arabic manuscripts, which he found in the library of the Escorial; it also contains a number of quotations from Arabic works on history. The manuscripts are classified according to subjects. The second volume gives an account of a large collection of geographical and historical manuscripts, which contain valuable information regarding the wars between the Moors and the Christians in Spain. Casiri's work is not yet obsolete, but a more scientific system is adopted in Hartwig Derenbourg's incomplete treatise, Les Manuscrits arabes de l'Escorial (Paris, 1884).
