= Lebanese people in Sweden =

Total population
- 29,774 (2024)

Regions with significant populations
- Stockholm, Gothenburg, Uppsala, Malmö

Languages
- Arabic (Lebanese Arabic), and Swedish

Religion
- Christianity and Islam

Related ethnic groups
- Lebanese people

The Lebanese people of Sweden are people from Lebanon or those of Lebanese descent who live in the country of Sweden. The majority of Lebanese people immigrated to Sweden in the period between 1970s and 1980s, either escaping the Lebanese Civil War or for economic reasons. In 2016, there were 148 registered emigrations from Sweden to Lebanon.

The Lebanese people in Sweden have set up their own traditional cultural and political organizations, including the Swedish Lebanese Friendship Association (SLFA). There is a Lebanese embassy in Stockholm.

Most Lebanese in Sweden belong to various Christian denominations (Maronite, Greek Orthodox, Melkite Catholic, Protestant), but there is also a sizable number of Muslims (Sunni and Shi'a) and also some Druze.

== Demographics ==
Distribution of lebanese people in Sweden by age groups (2024)
1. 0-19 (6.98%)
2. 20-64 (80.9%)
3. 65-100 (12.2%)

Number of Lebanese people (born in lebanon only) residing in Sweden across the years:

| Years | Men | Women | Total | Growth (%) |
|---|---|---|---|---|
| 2000 | 11,046 | 8,992 | 20,038 | —N/a |
| 2001 | 11,131 ▲ | 9,097 ▲ | 20,228 ▲ | +0.94% ▲ |
| 2002 | 11,287 ▲ | 9,186 ▲ | 20,473▲ | +1.19% ▲ |
| 2003 | 11,445 ▲ | 9,366 ▲ | 20,811 ▲ | +1.62% ▲ |
| 2004 | 11,599 ▲ | 9,507 ▲ | 21,106 ▲ | +1.40% ▼ |
| 2005 | 11,805 ▲ | 9,636 ▲ | 21,441 ▲ | +1.56% ▲ |
| 2006 | 12,488 ▲ | 10,209 ▲ | 22,697 ▲ | +5.53% ▲ |
| 2007 | 12,634 ▲ | 10,333 ▲ | 22,967 ▲ | +1.17% ▼ |
| 2008 | 12,844 ▲ | 10,447 ▲ | 23,291 ▲ | +1.39% ▲ |
| 2009 | 13,082 ▲ | 10,619 ▲ | 23,701 ▲ | +1.73% ▲ |
| 2010 | 13,356 ▲ | 10,760 ▲ | 24,116 ▲ | +1.72% ▼ |
| 2011 | 13,543 ▲ | 10,851 ▲ | 24,394 ▲ | +1.14% ▼ |
| 2012 | 13,758 ▲ | 10,985 ▲ | 24,743 ▲ | +1.41% ▲ |
| 2013 | 14,012 ▲ | 11,200 ▲ | 25,212 ▲ | +1.86% ▲ |
| 2014 | 14,299 ▲ | 11,400 ▲ | 25,699 ▲ | +1.90% ▲ |
| 2015 | 14,496 ▲ | 11,663 ▲ | 26,159 ▲ | +1.76% ▼ |
| 2016 | 14,877 ▲ | 12,029 ▲ | 26,906 ▲ | +2.78% ▲ |
| 2017 | 15,183 ▲ | 12,304 ▲ | 27,487 ▲ | +2.11% ▼ |
| 2018 | 15,514 ▲ | 12,605 ▲ | 28,119 ▲ | +2.25% ▲ |
| 2019 | 15,722 ▲ | 12,786 ▲ | 28,508 ▲ | +1.36% ▼ |
| 2020 | 15,912 ▲ | 12,973 ▲ | 28,885 ▲ | +1.31% ▼ |
| 2021 | 16,119 ▲ | 13,194 ▲ | 29,313 ▲ | +1.46% ▲ |
| 2022 | 16,358 ▲ | 13,412 ▲ | 29,770 ▲ | +1.54% ▲ |
| 2023 | 16,408 ▲ | 13,468 ▲ | 29,876 ▲ | +0.35% ▼ |
| 2024 | 16,291 ▼ | 13,483 ▲ | 29,774 ▼ | -0.34% ▼ |
| 2025 | 16 126 ▼ | 13 450 ▼ | 29 576▼ | -0.67% ▼ |
Source: Statistics Sweden

According to 2024 data from the Swedish Migration Agency, the number of Lebanese citizens granted first-time residence permits has shifted significantly compared to historical figures. In 2024, while Sweden overall issued over 93,000 permits, the specific grants for Lebanese nationals were primarily distributed among family reunification and work categories. Notably, Sweden granted the lowest number of asylum-related permits on record in 2024 (6,250 total for all nations), with Lebanese applicants representing a small fraction of this total. According to data from 2024, the Lebanese-born population in Sweden is more established, with the largest age groups being 40–44 years (3,777 individuals (2,062 men and 1,715 women)), then 55–59 years (3,751 individuals (2,111 men and 1,640 women)), 45–49 years (3,513 individuals (1,841 men and 1,672 women)) and finally 35–39 years (3,043 individuals (1,716 men and 1,327 women))

== Notable people ==
See List of Lebanese people in Sweden

== See also ==
- Arabs in Sweden
- Asian immigrants to Sweden
- Lebanese people in Denmark
- Immigration to Sweden
