= Lebanese Venezuelans =

Lebanese Venezuelan
- (Venezuela) (Lebanon)

Total population
- 500,000

Regions with significant populations
- Caracas, Maracaibo, Valencia, Maracay, Barcelona-Puerto La Cruz, Ciudad Guayana, Margarita Island, Punto Fijo

Languages
- Venezuelan Spanish, Lebanese Arabic

Religion
- Overwhelmingly Catholic Christian, some Druze and Muslims

A Lebanese Venezuelan is a Venezuelan citizen of Lebanese origin or descent. There are around 500000 people of Lebanese ancestry in Venezuela.

== Migration history ==
Lebanese immigration to Venezuela started when the first wave began to arrive to the country during 1862, in the last months of the Federal War. Once disembarked in the ports of Venezuela, they were classified by the authorities as Turks, because they had only been issued passports with that nationality. According to research, two of the entry points were Margarita Island and Puerto Cabello. The first contingent of Lebanese settled in these ports and also in Cumaná, La Guaira and Punto Fijo, from where they spread to the interior of the country. They worked mainly in the commercial sector, helping to develop this sector in the national economy that until the moment presented little progress.

The second wave of Lebanese immigration developed after 1918. After the defeat of the Ottoman Empire in World War I, the French Mandate of Syria was established, with one of its subdivisions being the State of Greater Lebanon. The harsh conditions of the postwar period once again motivated the Lebanese to embark on a path similar to that of the 19th century towards the American continent, including Venezuela.

Despite the fact that the Lebanese had arrived in Venezuela on several occasions, it was not until the mid-1960s and early 1970s that immigration became more forceful, since at that time Venezuela had many employment opportunities and of good living.

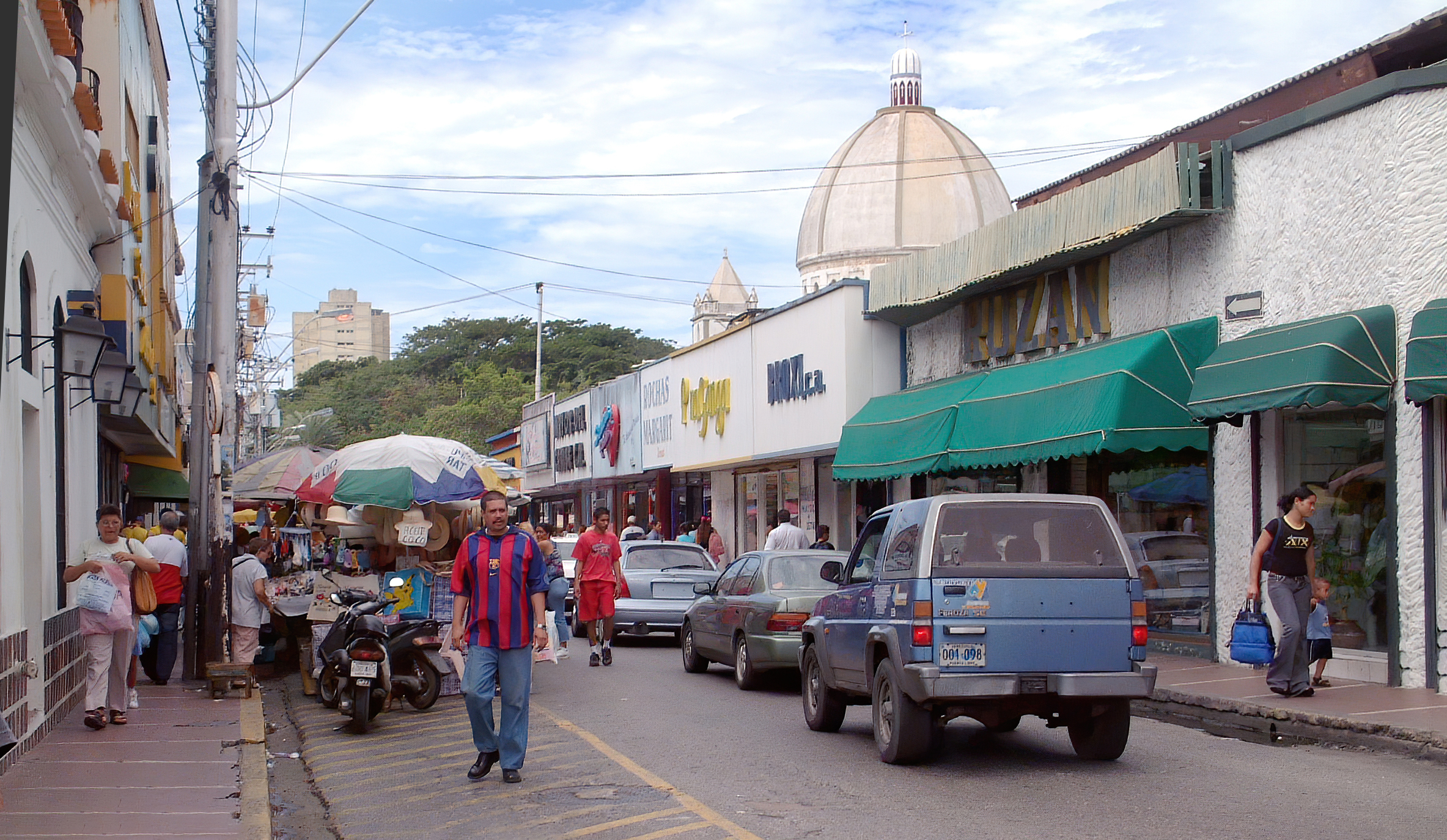
Porlamar, Nueva Esparta, a city with a significant Lebanese Venezuelan population

The Lebanese were able to maintain their traditions and their identity already in Venezuelan territory, which they prioritize in relation to the education of young people in their community.

== Religion ==
In religion, the majority of Lebanese-Venezuelans are Christians who belong to the Maronite Catholic Church, Roman Catholic, Eastern Orthodox and Melkite Catholic. A scant number are Muslims.

Venezuela is home of the largest Druze communities outside the Middle East, the Druze community are estimated around 60,000, and they are mostly Lebanese and Syrian.

== Notable people ==
- Tareck El Aissami, politician who has served as Vice President of Venezuela from 4 January 2017 to 14 June 2018.
- Dad Dager, actress.
- Jorge Dager, politician.
- Elías Jaua, politician, former Vice President of Venezuela and university professor.
- Joanna Hausmann Jatar, comedian, writer and actress.
- Braulio Jatar Dotti, politician
- Braulio Jatar, lawyer and journalist
- Coraima Torres, actress.
- Elizabeth Ayoub, singer and actress
- Julian Chela-Flores, astrobiologist and physicist.
- Nelson Mezerhane- banker, owner of Diario Las Americas of Miami, Florida
- Abelardo Raidi- journalist
- Henry Ramos Allup, politician and former president of the National Assembly
- Elías Sayegh, politician, mayor of El Hatillo Municipality
- Tarek William Saab, politician, governor of Anzoátegui from 2004 to 2012 and attorney general of Venezuela since 2017

== See also ==
- List of Lebanese people (Venezuela)
- Lebanese diaspora
- Arab Venezuelans
