= Lydia Canaan =

Lebanese singer-songwriter

Lydia Canaan ليديا كنعان
- Also known as: Angel
- Born: Lydia Kanaan; December 2, 1967 (age 58); Brummana, Lebanon
- Origin: Lebanese
- Genres: Pop; heavy metal
- Occupation: Singer-songwriter
- Instrument: Vocals (mezzo-soprano)
- Years active: 1984–2001
- Spouse: Thomas Vitins (m. 1993)

Lydia Canaan (Arabic: ليديا كنعان; born December 2, 1967) is a Lebanese singer-songwriter.

Canaan gained local recognition in Lebanon performing heavy metal cover songs during the Lebanese Civil War despite the conflict. Canaan was one of the first Middle Eastern artists to sing solely in English, and one of the first to have music videos played on MTV Europe, MTV Southeast Asia, MTV Russia, and MTV Middle East.

== Life and career ==
=== Early life and education ===
Born and raised in Brummana, Lebanon during the Lebanese Civil War to a Greek Orthodox family, Canaan studied at Brummana High School (BHS). From a young age singing, lyrical composition, and dancing served as an outlet and catharsis for Canaan. Canaan's parents discouraged her from singing heavy metal and forbid her to have a musical education or formal training. As reported by the newspaper Campus, "For Lydia Canaan's first gig, she had to throw her trademark short rockish black leather skirt and studs out of her bedroom window in Brummana, put on a long skirt, lie to her conservative father about where she was going, and, after changing into her leather gear, singing her teenage heart out as Angel with the band Equation".

=== Early career ===
In 1984, Canaan—under the stage name Angel—joined the heavy metal band Equation, who until then had been intent on finding a male lead singer. Canaan's talent, personality, and stage presence gained her national popularity among Lebanese youth. The same year, she donned what would become her trademark, trend-setting look: revealing, studded leather outfits with dramatic capes and hip-length blonde-streaked hair. Off stage, Canaan's Alma Mater, Brummana High School (BHS), voted her "Best Dressed". On stage, her provocative costumes contributed to the perception of her as a sex symbol. The Daily Star wrote: "On stage, with her daring looks and style, Canaan became a role model". At the height of their success the band drew a crowd of over 15,000. Canaan's first original composition, "Why All The Hurt", a tribute to a deceased friend that she wrote as a teenager, was a No. 1 hit on the radio charts in Lebanon.

Following Canaan's first concert with Equation, a The Gulf Today writer noted: "the first show produced a phenomenal reaction . . . It is incredible that amidst the state of civil war that existed in Lebanon at that time when most people had no idea if they would see another day she managed to keep her ambitions alive". Society magazine stated: "tickets were sold out but more teenagers stormed in to see the young Angel perform... To accommodate the crowd concert organizers had to stamp on each fan's hand as they ran out of tickets. It was... her first success".

Since her first public appearance, Canaan held over 25 sell-out concerts in the country from 1984 to 1988, and despite the risks and dangers of warring militias and armies, recorded her songs for radio, and topped the charts in Lebanon. Her last concert with Equation was held in 1986.

=== Solo career ===
In 1987, Canaan embarked on a solo career, performing her original compositions, such as "To Oblivion and Back", "Does it Need Some Action", "A Hard Situation", "Hey Richie", and "The Christmas Wish", all which were radio hits.

As Canaan's music evolved, her local fame grew. With Lebanon under Syrian occupation, Canaan's concerts were held in East Beirut, Mount Lebanon, and the north of Lebanon. In Tripoli, the second largest city in Lebanon, Canaan performed in front of a sold-out crowd under tight security despite having received death threats.

In 1987, Canaan performed to a crowd of 20,000 at the Beirut Rock Festival. In 1988, she held sell-out concerts for three consecutive nights at Casino du Liban, the last performer to grace its stage until it resumed activity following the end of the Liberation War in 1990.

Canaan's local success and aspirations for international success were reported on by the Arab media, Al-Hayat writing that she had " ... invaded the European market with her ballads". In 1989, she left Lebanon and settled in Zurich, Switzerland, where she became a naturalized Swiss citizen. There she took vocal lessons with soprano Anita Monti. In 1990, she was interviewed by Radio Z in Zurich where her songs received airplay.

In 1991, Canaan began working with record producer David Richards (producer of Queen and David Bowie). The same year she gave a live interview for NBC Europe. Also in 1991 Canaan signed a two-year contract with London-based production company Spinny Music (led by Queen manager Jim Beach) to write and record her original songs produced by David Richards at Mountain Studios in Montreux, Switzerland. The same year she recorded the duet "Love and Lust" with Queen drummer Roger Taylor.

The same year, she recorded the duet "Love and Lust" with Queen drummer Roger Taylor.

In 1993, Canaan recorded songs "Libnan", "Fallin'", and her cover of John Lennon's "Gimme Some Truth".

In February 1995, Canaan, who had up until that time performed rock under the stage name Angel, dropped the moniker, and under the name Lydia Canaan presented the pop ballad "Beautiful Life" (produced by Barry Blue and The Rapino Brothers) at the Midem in Cannes, France. That Spring, Canaan's international release of the single "Beautiful Life" by London-based Pulse-8 Records gained her international critical acclaim, the buzz culminating in a promo tour in England and radio airplay in the UK, Europe, South Africa, and the Middle East.

Canaan performed "Beautiful Life" at the launch of MTV Europe held in Beirut on May 12, 1995. In promoting the event, MTV Europe billed her as "the diva from the Middle East". During the press conference, President of MTV Europe Peter Einstein stated: "MTV is proud and privileged to play Lydia's videos on Music-Non-Stop Show... All at MTV have fallen in love with Lydia, her songs, and her performance."

Canaan's second single, "The Sound of Love", produced by Barry Blue and The Rapino Brothers and recorded at Maison Rouge Studios in London, was released in 1997. In 1998, Canaan's recordings made in New York City at Jay Ward's Dogbrain Music were exhibited on billboardtalentnet.com and appeared on its RadioBTN top 10 chart.

Canaan's never-released studio album The Sound of Love was completed in the summer of 2000. Recorded in London and New York City, it included the track "Right on the Verge", featuring Bryan Adams' keyboardist Tommy Mandel. The album was distributed by SIDI/XEMA in Saudi Arabia, Kuwait, UAE, Bahrain, Qatar, Oman, Egypt, Jordan, and Lebanon. In support of the album release, Canaan performed at various venues in Beirut, Jumeira Beach Hotel in Dubai, and Savage Garden Club and Rifaa Golf Club in Manama, Bahrain.

In 2004, "Libnan" was chosen as the title song of the advertisement "Rediscover Lebanon", produced and broadcast by CNN and commissioned by the Lebanese Ministry of Economy & Trade to promote Lebanon as a tourist destination.

In 2014, Canaan was named a semi-finalist by the UK Songwriting Contest for her song "Never Set You Free".

=== Public speaking and advocacy performances ===
Lydia Canaan gave talks at the United Nations Human Rights Council (UNHRC) in Geneva, Switzerland, on seven occasions between 2014 and 2017, and reportedly spoke at Casino du Liban in Beirut in 2014. In 2001, she spoke at the American Community School in Beirut, Lebanon, performed at the United Nations International Volunteers Day, and was awarded for her humanitarianism. She participated in the Arab International Forum in Solidarity With Palestinian Prisoners in 2014 and the International Forum for Justice in Palestine in 2015, both held in Beirut. In 2015, she performed at a rally in solidarity with Cardinal Patriarch Bechara Boutros Al-Rahi's call to elect a president of Lebanon.

=== Literature ===
American author Robert W. McGee mentioned Canaan's songs "So Much To Give" and "Never Set You Free" in his two novels Justifiable Homicide (2014) and Annie and the Senator (2015); Canaan and her songs "Shine", "Fallin'", and "Libnan" were referenced in all three volumes of McGee's The Iraqi Girl Trilogy (2015). McGee's characters often risk their lives to listen to Lydia Canaan's music.

In 2017, Canaan was featured in British journalist for Newsweek Orlando Crowcroft's book Rock in a Hard Place: Music and Mayhem in the Middle East, about the dangers she faced and obstacles she overcame as a rock music pioneer in Lebanon.

== Honors and awards ==
=== Honors ===
On January 16, 2002, President Emile Lahoud thanked Lydia Canaan for her services to Lebanon. The First Lady, Andree Lahoud, expressed admiration for Canaan's positive representation of Lebanon and invited her to give a short a capella performance at the Presidential Palace on January 28 and February 15. On March 21, 2002, Canaan again gave a brief performance a capella at a presidential ceremony honoring the wives of fallen Republican Guard Officers.

=== Awards ===
- 1988: Scoop d'Or Award by Scoop magazine. Reference:
- 1997: Lebanese International Success Award by Lebanese Ministry of Tourism. Reference:
- 2001: International Year of Volunteers Award by United Nations Development Programme (UNDP). Reference:
- 2003: Association pour la Promotion Feminine Award by Association pour la Promotion Feminine. Reference:
- 2005: Caritas Award by Caritas. Reference:
- 2014: Lebanese Army Award by Lebanese Armed Force.
- 2014: UK Songwriting Contest Semi-finalist Award by UK Songwriting Contest. Reference:
- 2016: Silver Medal for Outstanding Achievement by Global Music Awards. Reference:

== Videography ==
=== Music videos ===
- Hey Richie (1988): Broadcast by LBCI and NBC Europe.
- Beautiful Life (1995): Filmed at Canalot Studios and Syon House, London, England.
- The Sound of Love (1997): Filmed at the palace of Sir Francis Dashwood in West Wycombe, England.

=== Concerts ===
- Live in Concert at Casino du Liban (1988): Lydia Canaan performing as Angel live in concert at Casino du Liban. References:

=== Oration ===
- Hostage to Injustice (2014): Delivered at the United Nations Human Rights Council (UNHRC) in Geneva, Switzerland.
- Fighting Terrorism Without Violating Human Rights (2016): Delivered at the UNHRC in Geneva.
- Global Effects of the Persecution of Religious Minorities in the Middle East (2017): Delivered at the UNHRC in Geneva.

== Discography ==
=== Studio album ===
The Sound of Love

Label: None
Released: Unreleased
Format: Compact disc (CD)
Track listing:

- Beautiful Life by Barry Blue & Marco Sabiu (4:17)
- Right On The Verge (Tommy Mandel Mix) by Noel Cohen & Daryl Hair (4:37)
- The Sound of Love by Barry Blue & Marco Sabiu (4:10)
- A Love That Shines by Noel Cohen & Keith Plex Barnhart (4:42)
- The Hurt Won't Hurt (No More) by Barry Blue (3:51)
- Every Goodbye Ain't Gone by Geena Breedlove, Noel Cohen & Daryl Hair (4:07)
- Without You by Sandy Wilbur & Keith Barnhart (4:32)
- Somewhere in the Night by Barry Blue (4:24)
- Right On the Verge (Original Mix) by Noel Cohen & Daryl Hair (4:28)
- Fade Away by Noel Cohen & Keith Barnhart (4:30)

=== Singles ===
- 1985: The Sound of Equation – Lydia Canaan (Unreleased)
- 1986: Why All the Hurt? – Lydia Canaan (Unreleased)
- 1986: To Oblivion and Back – Lydia Canaan (Unreleased)
- 1987: The Hope Song – Lydia Canaan (Unreleased)
- 1987: Does It Need Some Action? – Lydia Canaan (Unreleased)
- 1987: A Hard Situation – Lydia Canaan (Unreleased)
- 1988: And You Call Me – Lydia Canaan (Unreleased)
- 1988: Hey Richie – Lydia Canaan (Unreleased)
- 1989: The Christmas Wish – Lydia Canaan (Unreleased)
- 1989: Me and Little Andy – Dolly Parton cover (Unreleased)
- 1995: Beautiful Life – Barry Blue (Unreleased)
- 1997: The Sound of Love – Barry Blue (Unreleased)
- 2004: Libnan – Lydia Canaan (Unreleased)
- 2014: Shine – Lydia Canaan (Unreleased)
- 2014: Fallin' Remix – Lydia Canaan (Unreleased)
- 2014: Love – Lydia Canaan (Unreleased)
- 2014: So Much to Give – Lydia Canaan (Unreleased)
- 2014: Gimme Some Truth – John Lennon cover (Unreleased)
- 2014: Never Set You Free – Lydia Canaan (Unreleased)
- 2017: Desire – Lydia Canaan (Unreleased)
- 2017: Never Never Never – Alberto Testa & Tony Renis cover (Unreleased)
- 2017: Fallin' – Lydia Canaan (Unreleased)
- 2017: Love is Blind – Lydia Canaan (Unreleased)
- 2017: Everybody's Running After a Dream – Lydia Canaan (Unreleased)
- 2017: Wish I Could Fly – Lydia Canaan (Unreleased)

== See also ==
- Fairuz, "The Cedar of Lebanon"
- Nancy Ajram, "Queen of Arab Pop"
- Julia Boutros, "The Lioness of Lebanon"
