= List of Lebanese people in the Caribbean =

The following is a list of people of Lebanese descent living in the Caribbean.

== Curaçao ==
This is a list of individuals born in Curaçao of Lebanese ancestry or people of Lebanese and Dutch dual nationality who live or lived in Curaçao.

- Isa, Ramez J(orge), byname Ronchi Isa (b. Oct. 17, 1917, Curaçao - d. March 17, 2005, Curaçao), prime minister of the Netherlands Antilles (1971, 1972–73)
- Emily de Jongh-Elhage, former Prime Minister of the now defunct Netherlands Antilles
- Abdul Nasser El Hakim, Curaçaoan businessman, politician and Minister of Economic Affairs

== Dominican Republic ==
This is a list of individuals born in Dominican Republic of Lebanese ancestry or people of Lebanese and Dominican dual nationality who live or lived in the Dominican Republic.

- Rafael Abinader, vice-president of the Dominican Revolutionary Party, career politician and writer
- Luis Abinader, politician, President of the Dominican Republic
- Yvonne Chahín Sasso, businesswoman and senator
- Jacobo Majluta Azar, former President
- Amelia Vega, Miss Dominican Republic 2002 and Miss Universe 2003
- Elías Wessin y Wessin, military commander and politician
- Sandra Zaiter, Dominican–Puerto Rican actress and television personality

== Haiti ==
This is a list of individuals born in Haiti of Lebanese ancestry or people of Lebanese or Haitian nationality who live or lived in Haiti.

- André Apaid, businessman
- John Boulos, professional soccer player
- Reginald Boulos, businessman and political activist
- Robert Malval, Prime Minister of Haiti (1993−1994)

== Jamaica ==
This is a list of individuals born in Jamaica of Lebanese ancestry or people of Lebanese and Jamaican dual nationality who live or lived in Jamaica.

- Edward Seaga, former Prime Minister of Jamaica
- Lisa Hanna, Miss Jamaica and Miss World 1993
- Shahine Robinson (née Fakhourie), Jamaica Labour Party politician

== Puerto Rico ==
This is a list of individuals born in Puerto Rico of Lebanese ancestry or people of Lebanese, American, and/or Puerto Rican nationality who live or lived in Puerto Rico.

- Gilbert Mamery, television personality
- Gricel Mamery, television personality
- Charlie Masso, singer, model, and actor, former member of boy band Menudo
- Gildo Masso, entrepreneur, founder of Masso Enterprises
- Sandra Zaiter, Dominican–Puerto Rican actress and television personality

== See also ==
- List of Lebanese people
- List of Lebanese people in the Netherlands
- List of Lebanese people (diaspora)
