= List of Lebanese people in Venezuela =

This is a list of notable individuals born in Venezuela of Lebanese ancestry or people of Lebanese and Venezuelan dual nationality who live or lived in Venezuela.

== Business ==
- Nelson Mezerhane – banker, owner of Diario Las Americas of Miami, Florida
- Alberto Raidi – businessman

== Actress and singers ==
- Elizabeth Ayoub – singer, composer
- Dad Dager – singer and actress
- Coraima Torres – actress

== Politicians ==
- Tareck El Aissami – politician
- Henry Ramos Allup – lawyer and politician
- Elías Jaua – politician and former university professor
- Abelardo Raidi – journalist
- Tarek William Saab – poet, lawyer and politician

== Scientists ==
- Julian Chela-Flores – astrobiologist and physicist.

== See also ==
- List of Lebanese people
- List of Lebanese people (Diaspora)
