= List of Lebanese people in Switzerland =

This is a list of notable individuals born in Switzerland of Lebanese ancestry or people of Lebanese and Swiss dual nationality who live or lived in Switzerland.

== Politics ==
- Jacqueline Badran - member of parliament.

== Business ==
- Samir Brikho - businessman (was Chief Executive of Amec Foster Wheeler)
- Nicolas Hayek - businessman (former CEO of Swatch)
- Mario El-Khoury - businessman (former CEO of CSEM)
- Sabine Getty - Jewelry designer and writer

== Film and television personalities ==
- Jacqui Safra - actor

== Music ==
- DJ Antoine - DJ

== Sciences ==
- Hussein Naim - biochemist
- Nicole Yazigy - PhD in microelectronics

== Healthcare ==
- Philip Saliba - Staff Engineer, Source Quality (J&J Consumer Health)

== Visual arts ==
- James Karnusian - cartoonist
- Khalil Berro - contemporary artist

== See also ==
- List of Lebanese people
- List of Lebanese people (Diaspora)
