= List of Lebanese people in Chile =

This is a list of notable individuals born in Chile of Lebanese ancestry or people of Lebanese and Chilean dual nationality who live or lived in Chile.

== Athletes ==
- Alexis Khazzaka – football player
- Nicolás Massú – tennis player

== Entertainment ==
- Julian Andretti – pornographic actor
- Nissim Sharim – actor and theater director

== Politicians ==
- Karen Atala – attorney and judge

== See also ==
- Arab Chileans
- History of the Jews in Chile
- List of Lebanese people
- List of Lebanese people (Diaspora)
