= List of Lebanese Brazilians =

This is a list of notable individuals born in Brazil of Lebanese ancestry or people of Lebanese and Brazilian dual nationality who live or lived in Brazil.

== Arts ==
- Antonio Abujamra – playwright and actor
- Sergio Assad – artist
- João Bosco – singer
- Fagner – singer
- Milton Hatoum – writer
- Malu Mader – actress
- Tito Madi – artist
- Raduan Nassar – writer
- Almir Sater – singer
- Wanderlea – singer

== Athletes ==
- Branco – football (soccer) player
- Nacif Elias – Lebanese olympian in judo
- Luís Fernandes – football (soccer) player
- Gilberto – football (soccer) player
- Beatriz Haddad Maia – tennis player
- Tony Kanaan – race car driver
- Allam Khodair – race car driver
- Gui Khury - skateboarder, Olympic gold medalist
- Marcílio – football (soccer) player
- Thaísa Menezes – volleyball player
- Jadir Morgenstern – football (soccer) player
- Felipe Nasr – race car driver
- Newton – football (soccer) player
- Emil Assad Rached – professional basketball player
- Salomão Salha – football (soccer) player
- Mario Zagallo – soccer player and coach

== Business ==
- Alberto Dualib – businessman
- Carlos Ghosn – businessman
- Edmond Safra – businessman
- Joseph Safra – businessman
- Roberto Dualibi – advertising executive
- Moise Safra – businessman

== Entertainment ==
- Luciana Gimenez – television presenter
- Arnaldo Jabor – film director, screenwriter and producer
- Sabrina Sato – comedian and television presenter
- Joãosinho Trinta – director of parades for Samba Schools in Rio de Janeiro Brazil during Carnival (carnavalesco)
- Julia Gama – Miss Brazil 2020, 1st Runner-Up at Miss Universe 2020
- Mia Mamede – Miss Brazil 2022
- Guga Chacra – journalist

== Politics ==
- Geraldo Alckmin – governor of São Paulo state, current Vice President of Brazil
- José Maria Alkmin – vice-president of Brazil (1964–1967)
- Iolanda Fleming – politician, former governor of Acre
- Fernando Haddad – politician
- Tasso Jereissati – former governor of Ceará state
- Paulo Maluf – former governor of São Paulo state
- Pedro Simon – former senator
- Simone Tebet – senator, presidential candidate
- Michel Temer – former president of Brazil

== Medicine ==
- Roger Abdelmassih – former in vitro doctor accused of sexual assault against women
- Adib Jatene – heart surgeon

== See also ==
- Lebanese Brazilian
- Arab Brazilian
- List of Lebanese people
- List of Lebanese people (Diaspora)
