= Lebanese Argentines =

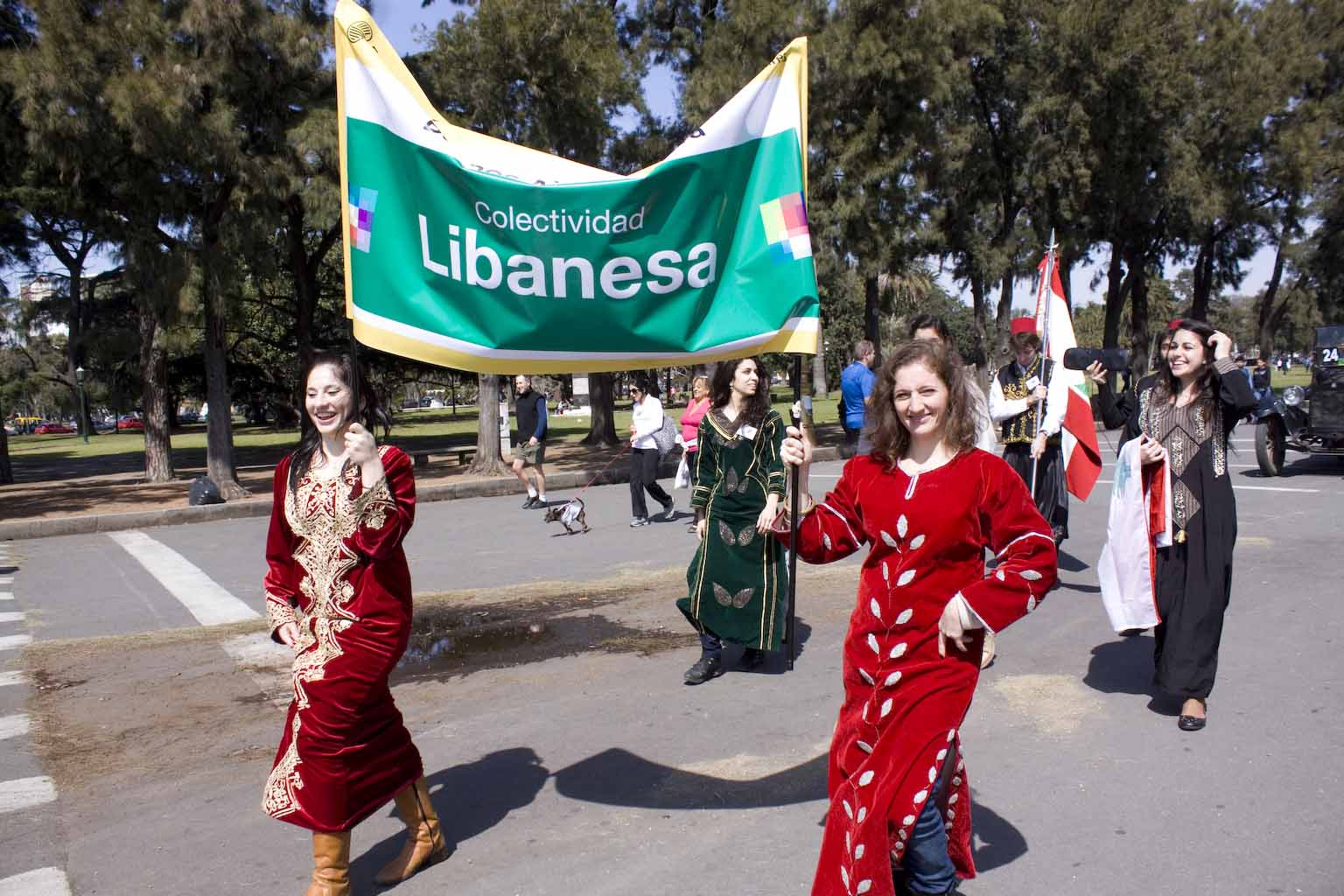
- Argentines of Lebanese descent in the city of Buenos Aires on Immigrant Day

Total population
- 1,500,000 (2014)

Regions with significant populations
- Throughout Argentina

Languages
- Rioplatense Spanish, Arabic (Lebanese Arabic)

Religion
- Maronite Catholic, Eastern Orthodox, Melkite, with Shia Islam, Sunni Islam and Judaism minorities

Related ethnic groups
- Lebanese people, other Asian Argentines and Arab Argentines

Lebanese Argentine refers to Argentine citizens of Lebanese descent or Lebanon-born people who reside in Argentina. Many of the Lebanese Argentines are descendants of immigrants cultural and linguistic heritage and/or identity, originating from what is now Lebanon.

Although a highly diverse group of Argentines — in ancestral origins, religion and historic identities — Lebanese Argentines hold a heritage that shares common linguistic, cultural and political traditions. They are closed related to the Syrian community and together are known as the sirio-libaneses (Syrian-Lebanese).

As of 2014, there are over 1,500,000 Lebanese Argentines. The overwhelming majority are Maronites and Greek Catholics, with Muslims and Jews being a small minority in comparison to them. The interethnic marriage in the Lebanese community, regardless of religious affiliation, is very high; most community members have only one parent who has Lebanese ethnicity. As a result of this, the Lebanese community in Argentina shows marked language shift away from the Arabic and French languages. As a result, only a few speak any Arabic and such knowledge is often limited to a few basic words. Instead, the majority, especially those of younger generations, speak Spanish as a first language.

The father of former First Lady Juliana Awada, Ibrahim Awada, was a Lebanese born in Baalbek and prominent businessman.

== History ==
In the 19th century, the first Lebanese settled in Argentina. From 1891 to 1920, 367,348 people from the Levant immigrated into Argentina. When they were first processed in the ports of Argentina, they were classified as Turks because what is modern day Lebanon was a territory of the Turkish Ottoman Empire. The causes for Lebanese to leave their homeland were an accelerated increase in demographics in Lebanon, the persecution by the Ottoman Turks, and the Italo-Turkish War. The Lebanese immigrants settle in the provinces of Buenos Aires, Cordoba, Salta, Tucumán, La Rioja, San Juan, Mendoza, Santiago del Estero, Misiones, Chaco, and Patagonia. A large percentage of Lebanese settled in the Cuyo region (which is made up of the provinces of San Juan, San Luis, Mendoza, and La Rioja).

== See also ==
- Argentina–Lebanon relations
- Asian Argentines
- List of Lebanese people in Argentina
- Islamic Organization of Latin America
