= List of Lebanese people in Monaco =

This is a list of notable individuals born in Monaco of Lebanese ancestry or people of Lebanese or Monegasque nationality who live or lived in the principality.

== Business ==
- Bahaa Hariri - businessman

== Musicians ==
- Bob Azzam - singer

== See also ==
- Lebanese people in France
- List of Lebanese people
- List of Lebanese people in France
- List of Lebanese people (Diaspora)
