= List of Lebanese people in Canada =

This is a list of notable Lebanese Canadians; individuals born in Canada of Lebanese ancestry, or people of Lebanese and Canadian dual nationality who live or lived in Canada.

== Academics and scholars ==
- Henry Habib – political scientist
- Michael Lynk – legal scholar
- Gad Saad – evolutionary behavioral scientist
- Issam Saliba– otolaryngologist
- Justine Sergent – neuroscientist

== Actors ==
- Garen Boyajian – actor
- Jade Hassouné – actor
- Shadi Janho - actor
- Arsinée Khanjian – actress; wife of film director Atom Egoyan
- Hassan Mahbouba – actor, comedian
- Lee Majdoub - actor
- Emeraude Toubia – actress
- Sandra Shamas – actress and writer
- Manuel Tadros – actor, musician

== Athletes ==
- Fouad Abiad – former IFBB professional bodybuilder
- David Azzi – former professional football player
- Jo-Anne Beaumier – international soccer player
- Gabriel Bitar – professional soccer player
- Ali Haidar – college basketball player (Michigan Tech Huskies)
- John Hanna – former professional hockey player
- Ed Hatoum – former professional hockey player (Vancouver Canucks)
- Fabian Joseph – former professional hockey player (Canada men's national ice hockey team)
- Nazem Kadri – professional hockey player (Calgary Flames)
- Ali Kanaan – basketball player and member of Lebanon's national basketball team
- David Lemieux – professional boxer
- Ali Mahmoud – basketball player and member of Lebanon's national basketball team
- John Makdessi – professional mixed martial arts (MMA) fighter
- Tony Mikhael – professional soccer player
- Alain Nasreddine – former professional ice hockey player
- Jean Sayegh – water polo player
- Omar El Turk – basketball player and member of Lebanon's national basketball team

== Business ==
- Charles Khabouth – hospitality entrepreneur; founder and CEO of INK Entertainment
- Assad Kotaite (1924–2014) – former Secretary-General and Council President of the International Civil Aviation Organization from 1976 to 2006
- Kevin O'Leary – entrepreneur and reality television personality (Dragons' Den, Shark Tank)
- Ablan Leon – founder of Leon's furniture company in 1901 in Welland, Ontario.

== Entertainment ==
- Marc Karam – professional poker player
- Nick Eh 30 – gaming YouTuber and streamer

== Film and television ==
- Xavier Dolan – filmmaker
- Amber Fares – filmmaker, documentarian, director
- Donald Shebib – fiction and documentary film and television director, editor, and screenwriter
- Ziad Touma – film director, producer, and screenwriter

== Musicians ==
- Paul Anka – singer and composer
- René Angélil – producer, husband of Céline Dion (his mother is Lebanese)
- Steve Barakatt – composer and pianist
- Bader Soma – composer, pianist, and singer
- Isabel Bayrakdarian – soprano of Lebanese Armenian origin
- Norman Brooks – singer
- Patrick Gemayel, stage name "P-Thugg" – member of musical act Chromeo
- K.Maro – rapper
- Joyce El-Khoury – opera singer
- Andy Kim – singer-songwriter
- Kristina Maria – singer
- Mark Masri – pop and religious singer
- Massari – pop and hip-hop singer
- Omar Mouallem – also known as A.O.K. (Assault Of Knowledge) – rapper
- Radwan Ghazi Moumneh – guitarist/producer, Cursed, Jerusalem in My Heart
- Julie Nesrallah – opera singer, radio broadcaster
- Tony Sal – music manager
- Noah "40" Shebib – producer, songwriter, and music executive
- Karl Wolf – singer-songwriter and producer
- Zeina – pop singer

== Painters ==
- Philip Aziz – painter and artist
- Ayah Bdeir – interactive artist and engineer
- Jay Isaac – visual artist

== Politicians ==
=== Federal ===
- Ziad Aboultaif – Federal MP, Conservative (2015– )
- Mark Assad – Federal MP, Liberal (1997–2004) and Quebec MNA, Liberal (1981–1988)
- Pierre de Bané – Federal MP, Liberal (1968–1984) and Federal Senator, Liberal (1984–2013)
- Michael Basha – Federal Senator, Liberal (1951–1976)
- Fonse Faour – Federal MP, NDP (1978–1980) and Provincial Newfoundland and Labrador NDP Leader (1980–1981)
- Mac Harb – Federal MP, Liberal (1988–2003) and Federal Senator, Liberal (2006–2013)
- Fayçal El-Khoury – Federal MP, Liberal (2015– )
- Allan Koury – Federal MP, Conservative (1988–1993)
- Maria Mourani – Federal MP, Bloc Quebecois (2003–2015)
- Eva Nassif – Federal MP, Liberal (2015–2019)
- Alain Rayes – Federal MP, Conservative (2015–2025) and Mayor of Victoriaville, Quebec (2009–2015)
- Marwan Tabbara – Federal MP, Liberal (2015–2021)
- Sam Wakim – Federal MP, Conservative (1979–1980)
- Paul Zed – Federal MP, Liberal (1993–1997, 2004–2008)

=== Provincial ===
- Patricia Arab – Nova Scotia MLA, Liberal (2013–present)
- David Boushy – Ontario MPP, Conservative (1995–1999)
- Lena Diab – Nova Scotia MLA, Liberal (2013–present)
- Joe Ghiz – PEI MLA, Liberal; Premier of Prince Edward Island (1986–1993)
- Robert Ghiz – PEI MLA, Liberal; Premier of Prince Edward Island (2007–2015)
- Lorraine Michael – Newfoundland and Labrador MLA, NDP (2006-Current) and Provincial Newfoundland and Labrador NDP Leader (2006–2015)
- Khalil Ramal – Ontario MPP, Liberal (2003–2011)
- Larry Shaben – Alberta MLA, Conservative (1975–1989)

=== Municipal ===
- Walter Assef – Mayor of Thunder Bay, Ontario (1973–1978, 1981–1985)
- Harout Chitilian – City councillor and former chairman of the City Council of Montreal (2009–2017)
- Eddie Francis – Mayor of Windsor, Ontario (2003–2014)
- Marceil Saddy – Mayor of Sarnia, Ontario (1980–1988)
- Aref Salem – City councillor in Montreal (2009– )

== Writers ==
- Hoda Adra – poet and playwright
- John Asfour – poet and writer
- Makram Ayache – playwright
- Shaunt Basmajian – poet
- Rawi Hage – writer
- Ann-Marie MacDonald – author, actor, playwright
- Wajdi Mouawad – poet and writer
- Trish Salah – poet and sociologist

== Others ==
- Fauzi Ayub (1966–2014) – influential member of Hezbollah
- Salah Bachir (born 1955) – Canadian philanthropist, patron of the arts, entrepreneur, magazine publisher and the President of Cineplex Media
- Doris Daou – Lebanese-born Canadian astronomer; one of NASA's leading experts in education and public outreach
- Mohammed Hassan Dbouk – journalist and alleged member of Hezbollah
- Karim Habib – automotive designer currently working for the BMW group

== See also ==
- Lebanese Canadians
- Arab Canadian
- Canada–Lebanon relations
- List of Lebanese people
- List of Lebanese people (Diaspora)
- Lebanese American
