= List of Lebanese people in France =

This is a list of notable individuals born in France of Lebanese ancestry or people of Lebanese and French dual nationality who live or lived in France.

== Business ==
=== Businessmen and entrepreneurs ===
- Mouna Ayoub - businesswoman
- Frédéric Fekkai - French-American hairdresser and founder of Frédéric Fekkai salons and hair products
- Carlos Ghosn - CEO of Renault and Nissan
- Marwan Lahoud - CEO of the weapon branch of EADS
- Jacques Saadé - businessman
- Iskandar Safa - businessman

=== Fashion ===
- Reem Acra - fashion designer
- Omar Harfouch - fashion entrepreneur
- Elie Saab - fashion designer

=== Architecture ===
- Nabil Gholam - architect

== Entertainment ==
=== Film, television and radio personalities ===
- Philippe Aractingi - film director
- Péri Cochin - television host
- Thomas Langmann - film producer and actor
- Jean-Pierre Rassam - film producer
- Julien Rassam - actor
- Léa Salamé - journalist

=== Musicians ===
- Rabih Abou-Khalil - jazz musician
- Bob Azzam - singer
- Guy Béart - singer and songwriter
- Louis Chedid - singer and songwriter
- Matthieu Chedid - singer and songwriter, a.k.a. -M-
- Warda Al-Jazairia - singer
- Ibrahim Maalouf - trumpeter, composer, arranger
- Pierre-Antoine Melki - also known as Nius, record producer (part of soFLY & Nius)
- Abdel Rahman El Bacha - pianist and composer
- Gabriel Yacoub - guitarist and singer
- Gabriel Yared - composer
- Ycare - singer-songwriter
- Grace Deeb - singer

== Politicians/Law ==
- Élie Aboud - member of the National Assembly of France
- Serge Ayoub - activist associated with the French extreme right
- Éric Besson - politician, minister
- Rita Nader Guéroult - advocate at the bureau of Paris
- Rima Abdul Malak - minister of culture
- Henri Jibrayel - politician
- Antoine Karam - former President of the Regional Council of French Guiana

== Sports ==
- Ali Hallab - boxer
- Alexis Khazzaka - football player
- Larry Mehanna - football player
- William Saliba - football player

== Writers ==
- Gilbert Achcar - academic, writer, socialist and anti-war activist
- Andrée Chedid - poet and novelist
- Georges Corm - historian and economist
- Chekri Ganem - writer and playwright
- Randa Habib - journalist
- Vénus Khoury-Ghata - writer
- Amin Maalouf - novelist
- Leilah Mahi - novelist
- Wajdi Mouawad - author and theater director
- Antoine Sfeir - journalist

== See also ==
- Lebanese people in France
- France–Lebanon relations
- List of Lebanese people
- List of Lebanese people (Diaspora)
