= List of Lebanese people in Bulgaria =

This is a list of notable individuals born in Bulgaria of Lebanese ancestry or people of Lebanese and Bulgarian dual nationality who live or lived in Bulgaria.

== Actors ==
- Bashar Rahal - actor (film War, Inc.; series The Unit, 24); brother of Carla Rahal
- Carla Rahal - actress and singer; sister of Bashar Rahal

== Sports ==
- Samir Ayass - footballer

== See also ==
- List of Lebanese people
- List of Lebanese people (Diaspora)
- Arabs in Bulgaria
