= List of Lebanese people in Cuba =

This is a list of notable individuals born in Cuba of Lebanese ancestry or people of Lebanese and Cuban dual nationality who live or lived in Cuba.

== People ==
- Yamil Chade - Lebanese-Cuban sports manager
- Emilio Estefan - Cuban-American musician and producer; husband of Gloria Estefan
- Lili Estefan - Cuban-American television personality, niece of Emilio Estefan
- Fayad Jamís - Cuban-Mexican poet and philosopher who played a major role in the Cuban intellectual life and collective identity development in the early 20th century
- Jamillette Gaxiola - Miss Cuba 2009
- Taufic Guarch - Mexican-Cuban-Lebanese footballer

== See also ==
- List of Lebanese people
- List of Lebanese people (Diaspora)
