= List of Lebanese Argentines =

This is a list of notable Arab Argentine individuals of Lebanese descent born in Argentina or people of Lebanese and dual nationality who live or lived in Argentina.

== Entertainment ==
- Carlos Balá - actor
- Yamila Diaz-Rahi - fashion model
- Zulma Faiad - actress and vedette
- Gran Sandy - comedian (born Alejandro Hangano Cassab)
- Mario Sapag - comedian and impersonator
- Ramzi Al Jurdi - Owner of Wayub Restaurant

== Media ==
- Karen Maron - journalist
- Daniel Hadad - journalist

== Military ==
- Mohamed Alí Seineldín - army colonel

== Music ==
- Jorge Cafrune - folklorist singer
- Alberto Hassan - singer

== Politicians ==
- Alfredo Avelín - politician
- Juliana Awada - first lady, wife of Mauricio Macri
- Soher El Sukaria - member of the Argentine Chamber of Deputies
- Raúl Jalil - governor of Catamarca Province
- Juan Luis Manzur - surgeon and politician, former health minister, governor of Tucumán Province and cabinet chief
- Jorge Obeid - governor of Santa Fe Province
- Alma Sapag - member of the Argentine Chamber of Deputies
- Elías Sapag - former federal senator of Neuquén Province
- Felipe Sapag - former governor of Neuquén Province
- Jorge Sapag - former governor Neuquén Province
- Luz Sapag - former federal senator of Neuquén Province and former mayor of San Martín de los Andes
- Eduardo Elias Traboulsi - Former congressman from CABA

== Religion ==
- Lucía Caram - nun and writer

== Sports ==
- Antonio Alegre - football official
- Julio Asad - soccer player
- Omar Asad - soccer team manager
- Elias Bazzi - soccer player
- Florencia Habif - field hockey player
- Omar Hasan - rugby union footballer
- Claudio Husaín - soccer player
- Darío Husaín - soccer player
- Sebastian Jabif - volleyball player
- Betina Jozami - retired tennis player
- Antonio Mohamed - retired soccer player
- Daniel Mustafa - soccer player

== Education and science ==
- Hugo Omar Seleme - political philosopher

== See also ==
- Arab Argentine
- List of Lebanese people
- List of Lebanese people (Diaspora)
