= List of Lebanese people in Cyprus =

This is a list of notable individuals born in Cyprus of Lebanese ancestry or people of Lebanese and Cypriot dual nationality who live or lived in Cyprus.

== Athletes ==
- Marcos Baghdatis - Cypriot professional tennis player (Lebanese father)
- Marios Georgiou (gymnast) - Cypriot professional gymnast

== Musicians ==
- Sarbel - Lebanese-British-Cypriot singer (Lebanese mother)

== See also ==
- List of Lebanese people
- List of Lebanese people (Diaspora)
