= Argentina–Lebanon relations =

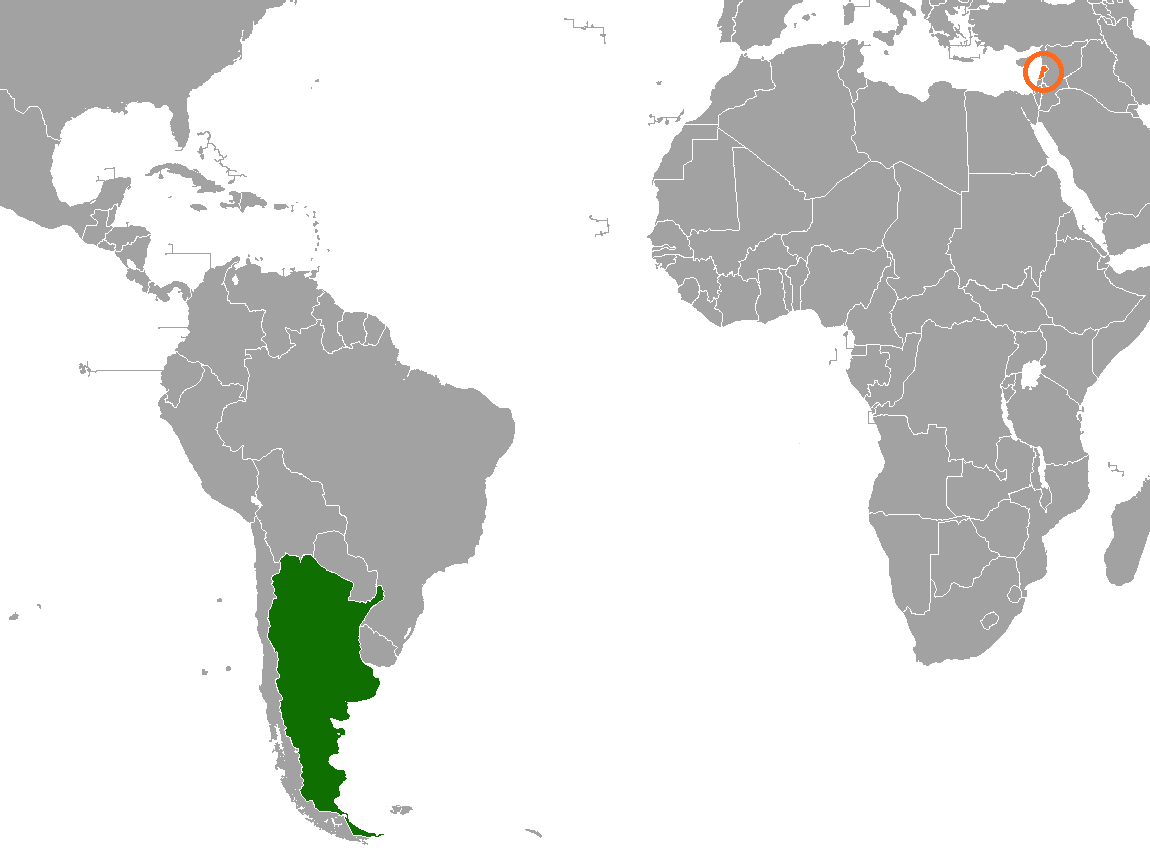
- Argentina: Lebanon

Diplomatic relations between the countries Argentina and Lebanon, have existed for over a century. Both nations enjoy friendly relations, the importance of which centers on the history of Lebanese immigration to Argentina. There are approximately 3 million Argentines of Lebanese descent. The Lebanese community in Argentina is the third largest immigrant community in the country (after Spain and Italy) and Argentina is host to the second largest community in the world (after Brazil). Both nations are members of the Group of 24 and the United Nations.

== History ==
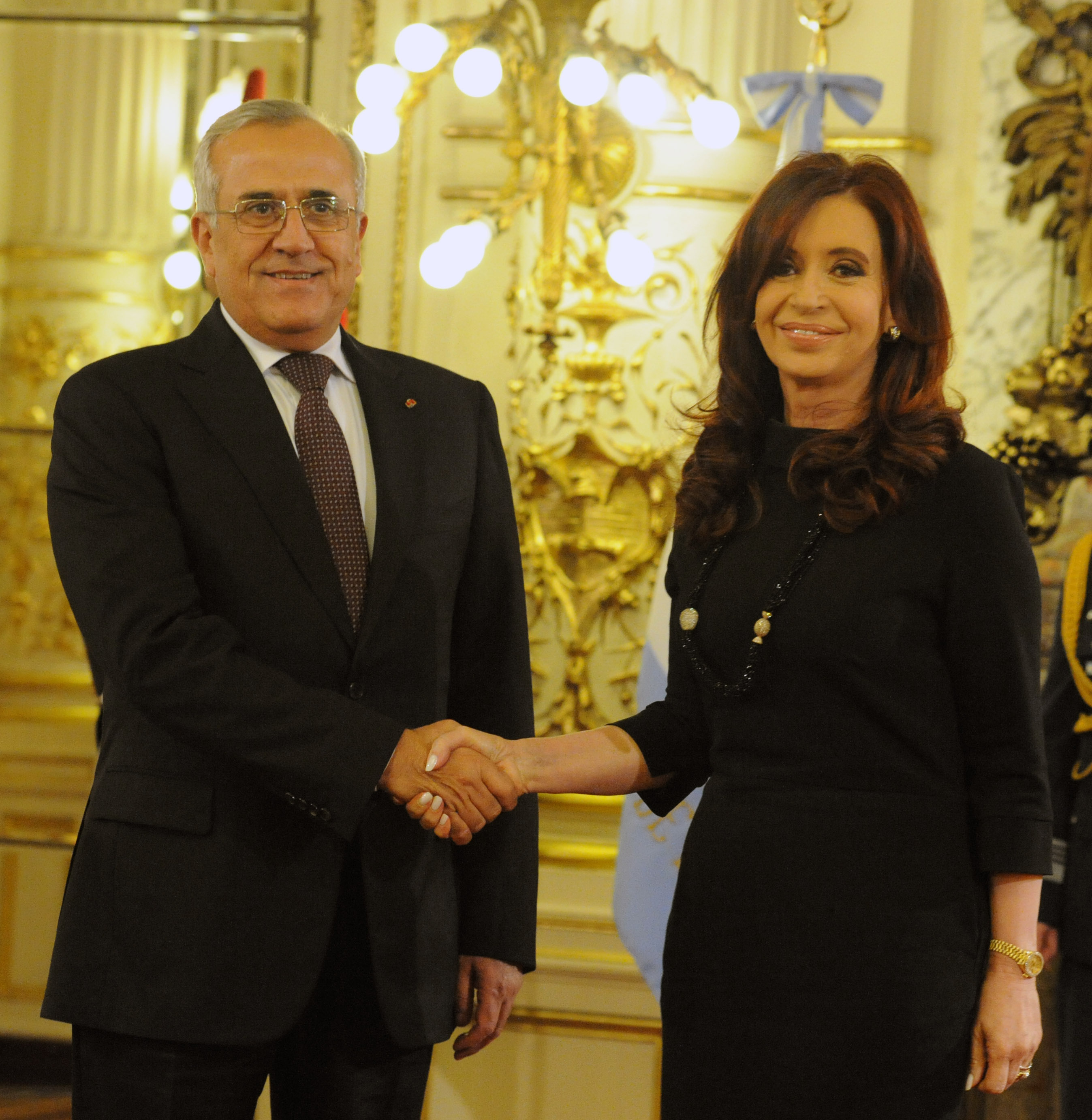
Argentine President Cristina Fernández de Kirchner greeting Lebanese President Michel Sleiman in Buenos Aires, 2012.

Since 1860, several thousands Lebanese began immigrating to Argentina, mainly to escape persecution from the Ottoman Empire (for which Lebanon was a part of at the time) and from the Mount Lebanon civil war. Initially most Lebanese migrants to Argentina were Christians, however, over the decades, Lebanese professing the Islamic faith also began immigrating to Argentina. In 1943, Lebanon obtained its independence from France and in 1945, Argentina recognized the independence of and established diplomatic relations with Lebanon. In May 1954, Lebanese President Camille Chamoun paid an official visit to Argentina and met with Argentine President Juan Perón. After the visit, Argentina opened an embassy in Beirut.

Relations between Argentina and Lebanon were limited during the Lebanese Civil War. In 1998, Argentina President Carlos Menem paid a three-day official visit to Lebanon. During the visit, President Menem met with Lebanese President Elias Hrawi and promoted enhanced trade relations between both nations. In 2012, Lebanese President Michel Sleiman paid an official visit to Argentina and meet with Argentine President Cristina Fernández de Kirchner.

In May 2016, Argentine Foreign Minister Susana Malcorra paid a visit to Lebanon. During her visit, she met with various local organizations assisting refugees affected by the Syrian Civil War and visited a Syrian refugee camp close to the Lebanese-Syrian border. That same year, Argentina agreed to resettle 3,000 Syrian refugees from Lebanon.

== High-level visits ==
High-level visits from Argentina to Lebanon

- President Carlos Menem (1998)
- Foreign Minister Susana Malcorra (2016)

High-level visits from Lebanon to Argentina

- President Camille Chamoun (1954)
- President Michel Sleiman (2012)
- Foreign Minister Gebran Bassil (2014)

== Bilateral agreements ==
Both nations have signed a few bilateral agreements such as an Agreement on Trade and Economic Cooperation; Agreement for Technical Cooperation and an Agreement on Tourism Cooperation.

== Trade ==
In 2017, trade between Argentina and Lebanon totaled US$110 million. Argentina's main exports to Lebanon include: beef, yerba mate, soy, garbanzo beans and dairy based products. Lebanon's main exports to Argentina include: preserved and canned food, dried fruit and chemicals for agricultural purposes.

== Resident diplomatic missions ==
- Argentina has an embassy in Beirut.
- Lebanon has an embassy in Buenos Aires.

== See also ==
- Lebanese Argentines
