= Issam Saliba =

Lebanese-Canadian surgeon

- Born: 1 April 1969 (age 56)
- Known for: Surgical Innovation, Otolaryngology
- Awards: Second Prize, Quebec Science 2012 edition
- Scientific career
- Institutions: Sainte-Justine University Hospital Centre affiliated with the Université de Montréal

Issam Saliba, a Lebanese-Canadian surgeon based in Montreal, Canada, is an otolaryngologist who developed a faster and less expensive technique for treating ruptured eardrums.

The technique can be performed in 20 minutes during a routine visit to an ear, nose and throat specialist.

Saliba is a researcher at the Sainte-Justine University Hospital Centre affiliated with the Université de Montréal. His new discovery won second prize at Quebec Science, 2012.
