= Roberto Duailibi =

Brazilian advertising executive (1935–2025)

Roberto Duailibi (8 October 1935 – 18 July 2025) was a Brazilian advertising executive, writer, and professor of Lebanese descent, originally from Zahlé.

== Life and career ==
Duailibi was born in Campo Grande, Brazil on 8 October 1935. After graduating with a degree in advertising from Escola de Propaganda de São Paulo in 1956, Roberto Duailibi began working as a publicist. He began his career in advertising in 1952 at the Colgate-Palmolive company. In 1956, he worked as a copywriter for advertising agencies such as Companhia de Incremento de Negócios (now part of Leo Burnett Worldwide), J. Walter Thompson, McCann Erickson, and Standard Propaganda, where he was the Creative Vice-President.

In 1968, with José Zaragoza, Francesc Petit, and Ronald Persichetti, he co-founded the DPZ advertising agency. He was awarded the "Advertiser of the Year" in 1969 by Prêmio Colunistas.

He was a course director at the Escola Superior de Propaganda e Marketing in São Paulo before becoming the dean of the Institution Council. He was also a Creative Professor at the Escola de Comunicações e Artes of the University of São Paulo.

Duailibi was chair of the Brazilian Association of Advertising Agencies (ABAP). He was an advisor of Fundação Bienal de São Paulo, Fundo Social de Solidariedade of the São Paulo State Government, and chairman at the Fundação Cultural Exército Brasileiro.

He released a book, Criatividade & Marketing, with Harry Simonsen Jr., and also published a book of his quotes, initially called Phrase Book. In 2005, he published Cartas a um Jovem Publicitário directed toward young advertising professionals. In 2008, he published a further collection of quotations, Idéias Poderosas with Marina Pechlivanis. In the same year, he also launched a new edition of Criatividade & Marketing, with a digital version of the Heuristic Ruler.

Duailibi died on 18 July 2025, at the age of 89.

== Bibliography ==
- 2008 Criatividade & Marketing, Roberto Duailibi & Harry Simonsen Jr. Editora M Books. ISBN 978-85-7680-039-2
- 2008 Idéias Poderosas – Felicidade, Roberto Duailibi e Marina Pechlivanis. Editora Elsevier
- 2008 Idéias Poderosas – Inteligência, Roberto Duailibi e Marina Pechlivanis. Editora Elsevier
- 2008 Idéias Poderosas – Negócios, Roberto Duailibi e Marina Pechlivanis, Editora Elsevier
- 2005 Cartas a um jovem publicitário. Editora Campus
- 2005Duailibi Essencial. Roberto Duailibi e Marina Pechlivanis, Editora Campus
- 2000 Duailibi das Citações. Editora Arx

== Sources ==
- Duailibi, Roberto. Cartas a um jovem publicitário. Editora Campus, São Paulo, 2005.
- Duailibi, Roberto & Simonsen Junior, Harry. Criatividade: a formulação de alternativas em marketing. São Paulo, Abril S/A, McGraw-Hill, 1971.
- McCarthy, E. Jerome. Marketing. Rio de Janeiro, Campus, 1982.
- Brezzo, R & COBRA, M. New Marketing. São Paulo, 2009.
- Kirkpatrick, Jerry. In defense of Advertising. Claremont, CA, 1997.
