= Hugo Omar Seleme =

Argentine philosopher

Hugo Seleme (born 1968, Cordoba, Argentina) is an Argentinean political philosopher professor of Ethics and Jurisprudence at Cordoba National University, Argentina. He is researcher at CONICET (Argentinean National Council for Sciences and Technology), and visiting professor at Pompeu Fabra University) School of Law, Barcelona, Spain and Heidelberg Center for Latin America. He has been a visiting scholar at Ohio University and researcher collaborator at Princeton University Center for Human Values. He has also had visiting positions at Alcalá University and Chile University. Currently, he is working on a book related to international distributive justice.

== Selected bibliography ==
=== Books ===
- Neutralidad y Justicia (2004) Barcelona: Marcial Pons.
- Las Fronteras de la Justicia Distributiva (2011) Madrid: Centro de Estudios Políticos y Constitucionales.
- Puro Cristianismo (2018) Mexico: Coyoacán.
- Bitácora del Naufragio. En la Tormenta Neoliberal (2018) Córdoba: Brujas.

=== Papers ===
- Defending the Guilty: A Moral Justification, Ethical Perspectives
- The Moral Irrelevance of Global and International Inequality, The Journal Jurisprudence
- A Rawlsian Dual Duty of Assistance, Canadian Journal of Law and Jurisprudence
