= Swiss Center for Electronics and Microtechnology =

Coordinates: 46°59′51″N 6°56′51″E

CSEM SA
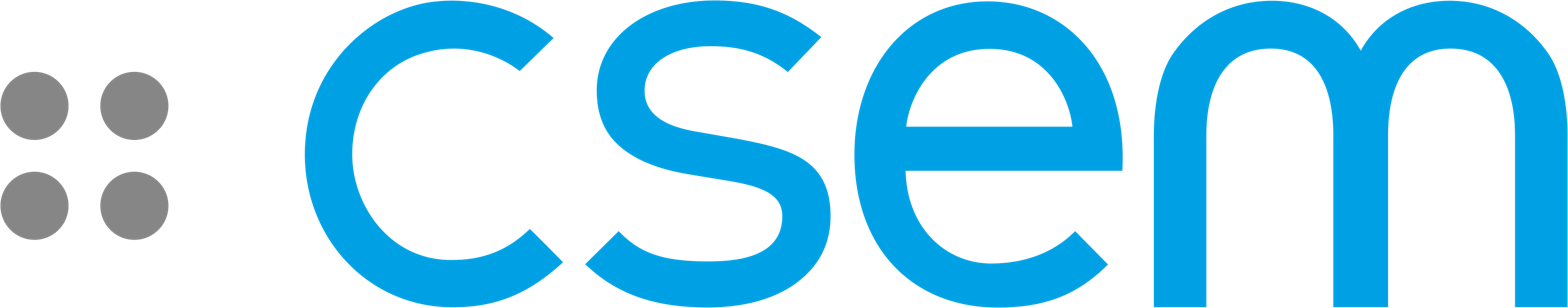
- Type: S.A. (corporation)
- Industry: Astrophysics, Automation, Energy, Food, Healthcare, Information and communications technology, Life sciences, Photovoltaics, Security, Space, Transportation, Watchmaking
- Founded: 1984
- Headquarters: Neuchâtel, Switzerland.
- Key people: Alexandre Pauchard (CEO), Andreas Rickenbacker (Chairman)
- Services: Small series production, R&D, IP, Consulting, Prototyping
- Revenue: 115.4 million CHF
- Number of employees: 627
- Website: www.csem.ch

The CSEM (French: Centre Suisse d'Électronique et de Microtechnique) is a Swiss research and development centre (R&D) active in the fields of precision manufacturing, digitalization, and renewable energy. It follows a public-private non-profit partnership model. CSEM develops and transfers technologies that are considered relevant in progressing the Swiss national economy. CSEM is a R&D Center for science and technology in Switzerland.

== Organization ==
CSEM’s mission is to develop and transfer technologies to the industrial sector to reinforce the sector’s competitive advantage. It works towards building ties between higher education institutions and partners in Industry, and aims to help entrepreneurs with the creation of start-up companies. CSEM’s headquarters are located in Neuchâtel, Switzerland. It also has five sites in the Swiss cities of: Alpnach, Allschwil, Bern, Landquart, and at the Technopark Zürich.

=== History of its geographical expansion ===
Over the years, CSEM has expanded its presence and capabilities through the establishment of various research centers.

1997 – Zurich Site. In 1997, CSEM integrated the former micro-optical laboratories of the Paul Scherrer Institut in Zurich, Switzerland. This integration allowed CSEM to broaden its technological offerings while strengthening its presence within Switzerland.

2001 – Alpnach Site. In 2001, CSEM launched a new research center, CSEM Alpnach, in Alpnach, Switzerland. The focus was on generating interactions and exploiting synergy effects in the domain of microrobotics.

2007 – Neuchatel Observatory. In 2007, CSEM integrated the Neuchâtel Observatory into its organization. The primary objective of this takeover was to associate the observatory's Time-Frequency laboratory with the University of Neuchâtel and to continue pursuing fundamental and applied research activities.

2007 – Landquart Site. In the same year, CSEM established another research center, CSEM Landquart, in Landquart, Switzerland. This center received support from the cantonal government of Graubünden and focused on developing new technologies and competencies in nanomedicine while contributing to the economic fabric of the Rhine Alpine Valley.

2022 – Allschwil Site (previously opened in Muttenz in 2011). In 2022, CSEM relocated its Basel site, previously opened in Muttenz in 2011, to the Switzerland Innovation Park in Allschwil, Switzerland. This move aimed to boost CSEM's activities in Tools for Life Sciences.

2022 – Bern Site. Also in 2022, CSEM opened a new office in Bern, Switzerland, located close to the University Hospital Bern. The purpose of this office was to further expand CSEM's activities in digital health, with a specific focus on wearable medical devices.

== History ==
CSEM was founded in 1984 by The Swiss Federal Council. It was created to provide Switzerland with a research and development (R&D) center that would enable the country to keep pace with technological innovation. Presently, CSEM operates as a Research and Technology Organization (RTO). In 1984, the City of Neuchâtel, in the Canton of Neuchâtel, Switzerland, was chosen as the location for the new research and development center due to its long tradition in watchmaking and its heritage in manufacturing industrial, precision, and mechanical components.

CSEM was formed by merging three different companies:

- LSRH, the Swiss Laboratory for Horological Research (Laboratoire suisse de recherches horlogères)
- CEH, the Centre of Electronic Horology (Centre électronique horloger)
- FSRM, the Swiss Foundation for Microtechnology Research

Today, CSEM has over 566 employees, and operates throughout Switzerland.

== Former CSEM chief executive officers ==
1984 - 1990	Max Forrer	(† 2019)
1990 - 1997	Peter Pfluger
1997 - 2009	Thomas Hinderling	(† 2011)
2009 - 2021	Mario El-Khoury
2021 -	Alexandre Pauchard

== Recognitions & Awards ==
The company has received several notable recognitions and awards for its technological advancements.

- In 2021, the company's "personalized skin on demand" technology, developed in collaboration with CUTISS AG, received the 3rd prize in the "Delivered Impact" category at the EARTO Innovation Awards. This automated technology facilitates the production of large, bioengineered skin grafts.
- In 2020, the company's optical blood pressure monitoring technology secured the 2nd place at the EARTO Innovation Awards. This innovation enables continuous blood pressure monitoring without the use of a cuff.
- In 2020, Jean-Dominique Decotignie was honored with IEEE Life Membership for his notable contributions to the development of real-time wireless sensor networks, with a focus on safety-critical applications.
- The company was awarded the Hermès Prize for Innovation in 2017. This award recognized the company's efforts to enhance the quality of life for individuals and society through the introduction and development of innovative products.
- In 2016, CSEM and ONERA (Office National d'Études et de Recherches Aérospatiales) jointly received the CCIFS Innovation Trophy for their collaborative work on pressure-sensitive paint used in transonic wind tunnels to improve aircraft safety and performance.
- Christophe Ballif was honored with the Becquerel Prize in 2016 for his outstanding contributions to research in solar technologies.
- Also in 2016, Nico de Rooij was elected as an MNE Fellow in recognition of his significant contributions to the field of MEMS (MicroElectroMechanical Systems).

== See also ==
- Science and technology in Switzerland
