= Gildo Massó =

Puerto Rican businessman

Gildo Massó González
- Founder and CEO of Masso Enterprises
- Born: December 8, 1926; San Lorenzo, Puerto Rico
- Died: January 15, 2007 (aged 80); Hato Rey, Puerto Rico
- Occupations: President and CEO of Masso Enterprises

Gildo Massó González (December 8, 1926 – January 15, 2007) was the founder and CEO of Masso Enterprises and the developer of the concept of "build it yourself" low-cost houses.

== Early years ==
Massó was born and raised in San Lorenzo, Puerto Rico where he received his primary and secondary education. His parents were Rafael Massó Vázquez and Francisca González Padín. He was a hardworking young man who admired the Puerto Rican political leader Luis Muñoz Marín. He helped support his family by working in the local hardware store. After graduating from high school, he enrolled in the University of Puerto Rico.

== First Masso Hardware Store ==
In 1951, Massó opened his first hardware store, Ferretería Masso (Masso Hardware Store) in San Lorenzo, which became a successful venture. He married Carmen Tuly Aponte in 1953. In 1954 he established his first cinder block factory.

In 1959, Massó ventured into the construction business and built the Massó Subdivision in San Lorenzo. In 1961, he opened Caguas' Lumber Yard in Caguas. In 1967, the Massó Cement Factory moved to much larger facility in Gurabo.

== Casas Massó ==
In 1974, with the need for affordable housing in Puerto Rico, Massó developed a concept of selling low-cost houses, made out of wood, known as Modelos Massó or Casas Massó (Masso Models). The idea was to supply customers with the necessary elements to build a low-cost home. The all-inclusive packages included floor plans, building materials, and construction loans.

In 1981, Massó acquired two Carlos Armstrong Hardware Stores in Ponce, and in 1983, he opened the Cayey Home Center in Cayey. In 1984 Massó built 550 residences in San Lorenzo, which is now known as "Massó City" and, in 1986, he built 67 residences in the Cerro Gordo sector of San Lorenzo.

In 1992, Massó introduced the new Casas Massó which was made of cement, with the same concept as the first models. In 1993, he set up a Super Massó Hardware Store consisting of 55,000 square feet (5,100 m^{2}) and offering over 60,000 products in Caguas. In 1996 Massó Enterprises was involved in a project which built 169 residences in Paseo San Lorenzo. In 1997 Massó acquired six Builder's Square Stores in Caguas, Bayamon, Carolina, Ponce, and Mayaguez. These were renamed Plaza Massó.

In 1995, the Massó Hardware Store introduced Auto-Express in which the customer used a drive-through to make purchases. This concept increased sales by 15%.

Gildo Massó introduced new models of the Casas Massó in 2001 and 2003.

Massó Enterprises has over $65 million in annual sales.

The company also has the training center"Massó School for all employees.

== Later years ==
Gildo Massó was named Business Man of the Year in 2004 and the VIP of the Week by Chrysler Corp.

A devoted Catholic and to the fulfillment of his religious obligations, Gildo was a supporter and advocate of Cursillos de Cristiandad Movement for more than 40 years, both in the Archdiocese of San Juan and the Diocese of Caguas. He designed and generously directed the construction of both Casas de Cursillos in each diocesan community.

On January 15, 2007, Gildo Massó died from health complications during a routine medical checkup in the Auxilio Mutuo Hospital of Hato Rey, Puerto Rico. He is survived by his wife Carmen Tuly Aponte and his two children Gildo and Tuly Massó.

== See also ==
- List of Puerto Ricans
