= Yvonne Chahín Sasso =

Dominican Republic businesswoman and senator (born 1945)

The Most Excellent Yvonne Chahín Sasso

National Senator for the Province of El Seibo
- In office 9 September 2010 – 16 August 2016
- Preceded by: Roberto Rodríguez (Dominican Revolutionary Party)
- Succeeded by: Santiago Zorrilla (Modern Revolutionary Party)

Personal details
- Born: 26 December 1945 (age 80) El Seibo, Dominican Republic
- Party: Dominican Liberation’s Party (PLD)
- Relations: Jacqueline Chahín Sasso (sister; former Deputy); Francesca Trigo Chahín (daughter); Ricardo Jacobo Cabrera (son-in-law; minister)
- Parent(s): José Chahín, Venecia Sasso
- Profession: Business manager, dressmaking industry
- Ethnicity: White Dominican
- Net worth: RD$ 10.31 million (2010) (US$ 276,000)

Yvonne Chahín Sasso (born 26 December 1945) is a businesswoman from the Dominican Republic. She was elected by the Congress of the Dominican Republic as Senator for the Province of El Seibo, after the death in July 2010 of Senator-elect Manuel Ramón Antonio 'Lincoln' Jacobo Reyes (Mr. Jacobo was the father of Mrs. Chahín’s son-in-law).
