= Mario El-Khoury =

Lebanese-Swiss engineer and business executive

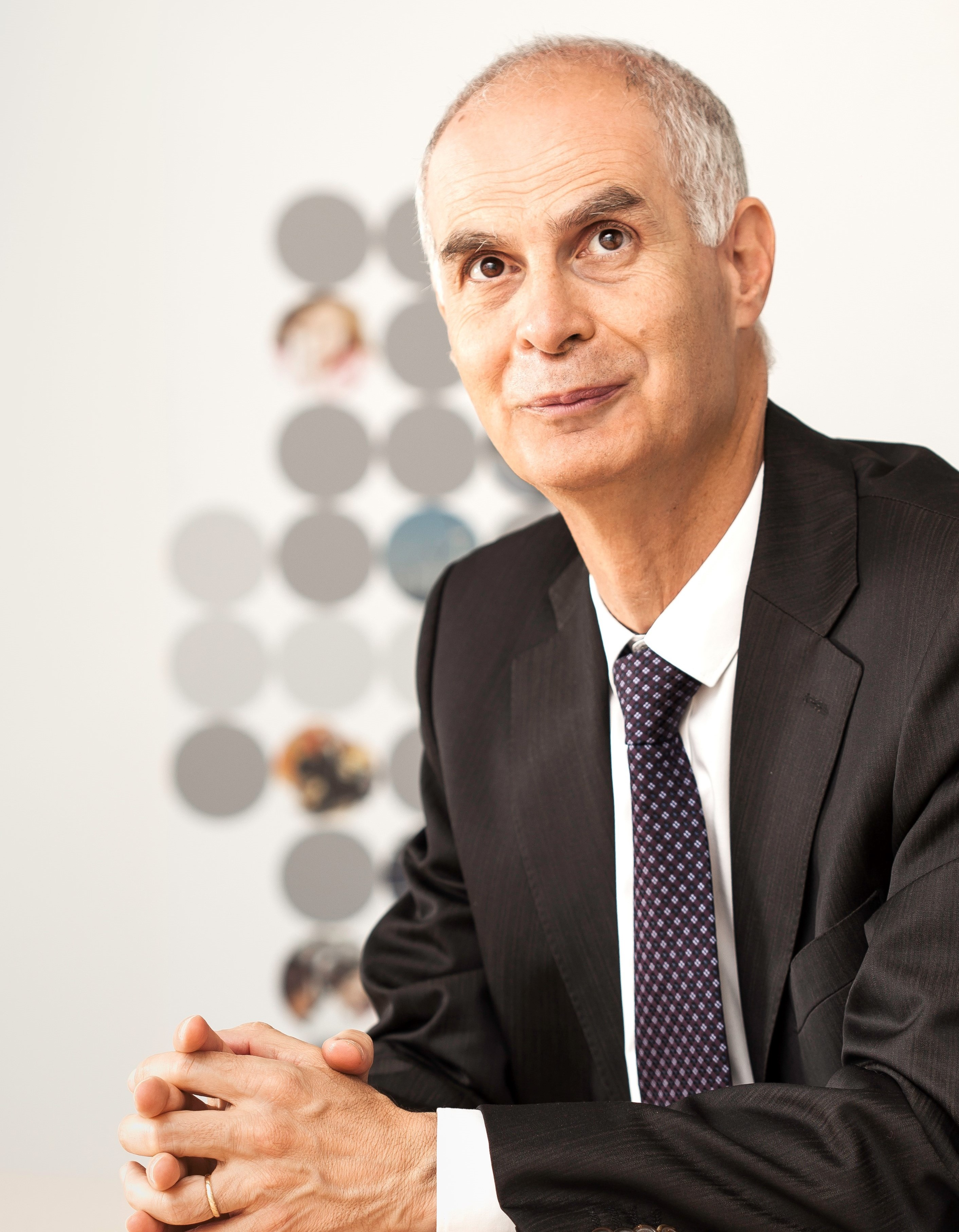
- Born: March 12, 1963 (age 63); Lebanon
- Education: Ecole polytechnique fédérale de Lausanne, Carnegie-Mellon University
- Occupation: Engineer
- Spouse: Véronique El-Khoury Mercier
- Awards: Fellow of the Swiss Academy of Engineering Sciences (SATW)

Mario El-Khoury (born 12 March 1963 in Maghdouché, Lebanon) is a Lebanese-Swiss engineer, cited as a Digital Shaper by the economic magazine Bilanz in 2020, and among the 100 most important personalities of the Swiss economy in 2019 and 2020.

He has been the chief executive officer (CEO) of the Swiss Center for Electronics and Microtechnology (CSEM) from November 2009 to February 2021.

== Education ==
Mario El-Khoury studied engineering at the Ecole polytechnique fédérale de Lausanne (EPFL) and at Carnegie-Mellon University (Pittsburgh, USA). He graduated from EPFL (Dipl. El.-Ing., 1987, and Doctorate in Science, 1991). He is also a graduate of HEC Lausanne (MBA, 2000).

He received the Dipl. El.-Ing. degree from EPFL in 1987, the Doctorat ès Sciences degree from EPFL in 1991, and the Master of Business Administration degree from HEC Lausanne in 2000.

== Career ==
From 1992 to 1994, he worked at Portescap in La Chaux-de-Fonds as a project manager. In 1994, he joined CSEM as head of the "Industrial Control" sector. In 2003, he became vice president of the System Engineering. In 2019, he was appointed CEO of CSEM at the age of 46.

He was a member of the board of directors of the Neuchâtel Chamber of Commerce and Industry (CNCI) from 2010 to 2021, a member of the university council of the University of Neuchâtel from 2010 to 2017, and a member of the board of directors of Jade Invest SA from 2010 to 2019.

=== CEO of the CSEM ===
On November 1, 2009, Mario El-Khoury was appointed CEO of the CSEM by the Board of Directors, chaired by Swiss astronaut Claude Nicollier. As of his arrival, he had to settle the problem of the Solar Island project in Ras El-Khaima (United Arab Emirates), which was the subject of much controversy.

During his years at the head of the CSEM, he became known for his stance in favor of maintaining a strong manufacturing activity in Switzerland, a source of prosperity and social cohesion. For him, only technological innovation and digitalization can ensure the sustainability of the Swiss industry, which is mainly composed of small and medium entreprises (SMEs). His team played a fundamental role in the development of the first connected watch with the Swiss Made label.

Committed to the promotion of renewable energies, he launched in 2012 together with EPFL president Patrick Aebischer the PV-Center at CSEM. This applied research center is supported by the Swiss confederation to foster innovation in photovoltaics. Its new cleanroom facilities were inaugurated in 2016. Mario El-Khoury raised the Swiss public awareness of the energy consumption of bitcoin mining and the need to find alternatives to the Proof of work mining method.

Under his leadership, the staff of the research center increased from 387 in 2009 to 525 in 2021.

== Personal life ==
El-Khoury is married to Véronique El-Khoury Mercier. They are parents of two children.

== Recognition ==
- ABB – Asea Brown Boveri Prize, 1992
- Technologiestandort Schweiz, 1998
- Banque cantonale vaudoise prize, 2000
- BioAlps award, 2013
- Fellow of the Swiss Academy of Engineering Sciences (SATW), since 2013
