= Lists of Lebanese people =

Prominent Lebanese figures وجوه من لبنان
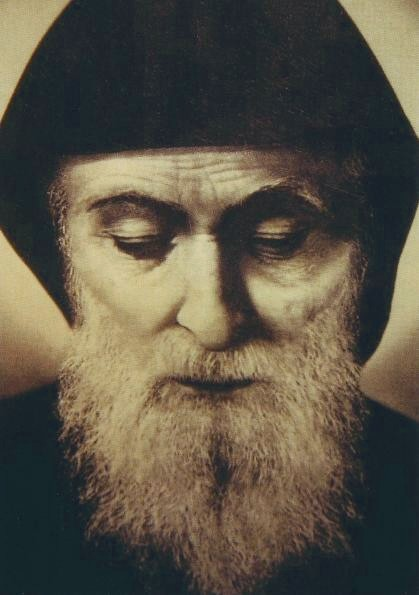
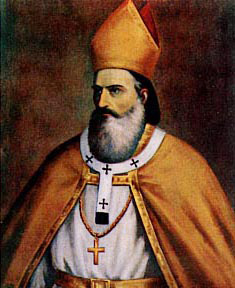
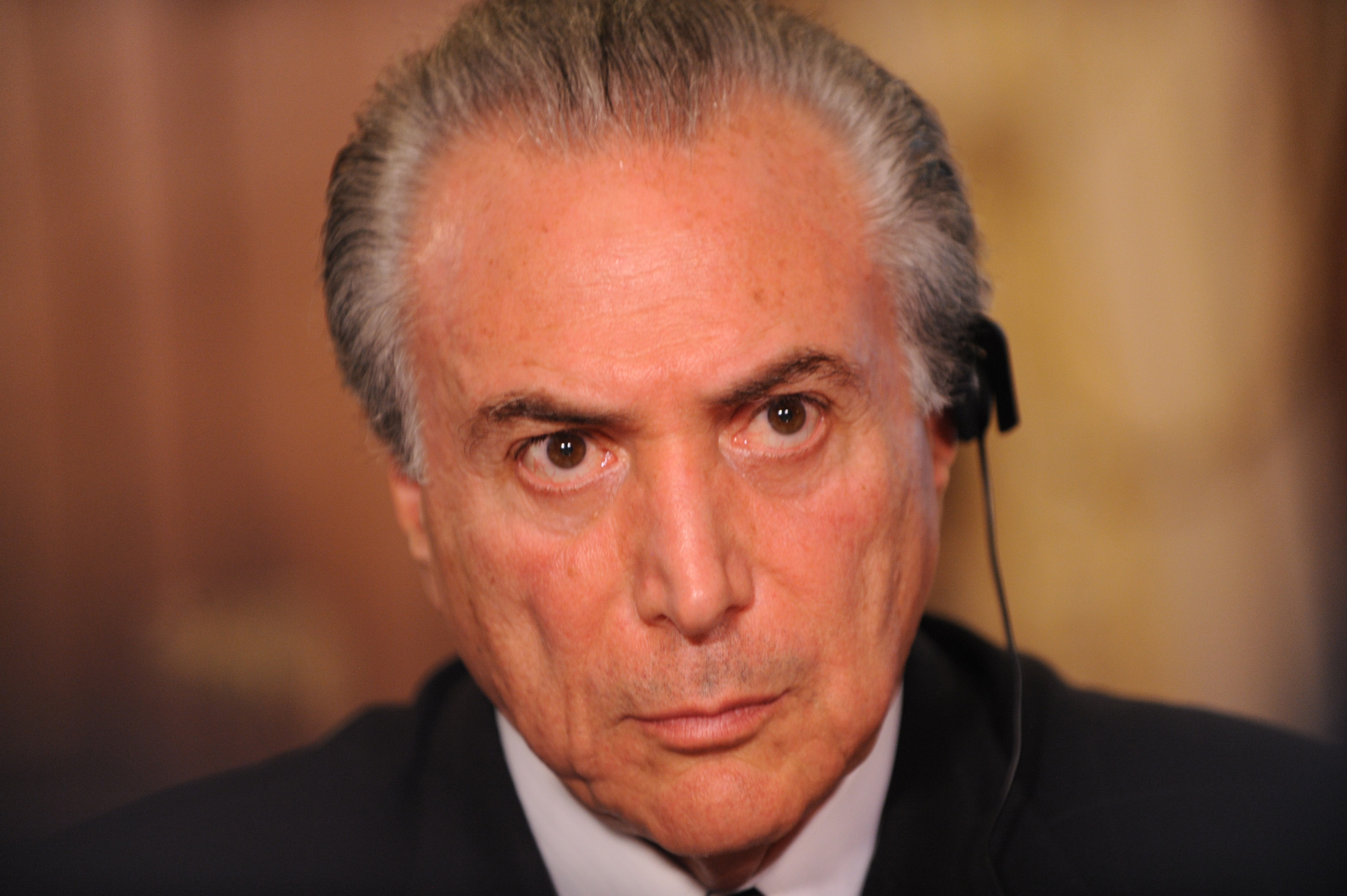
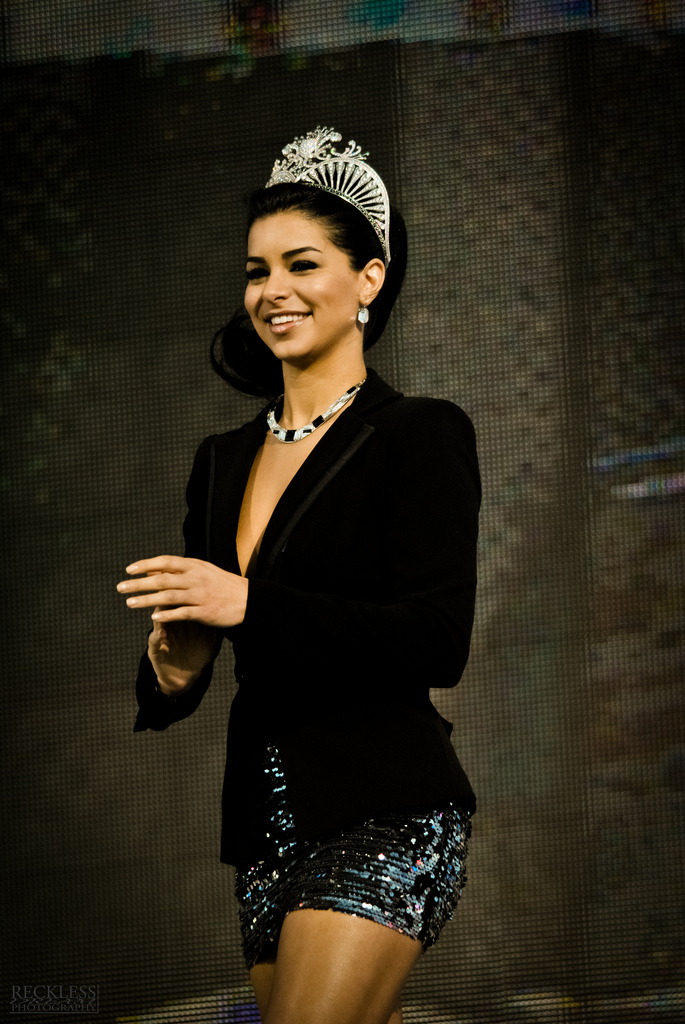
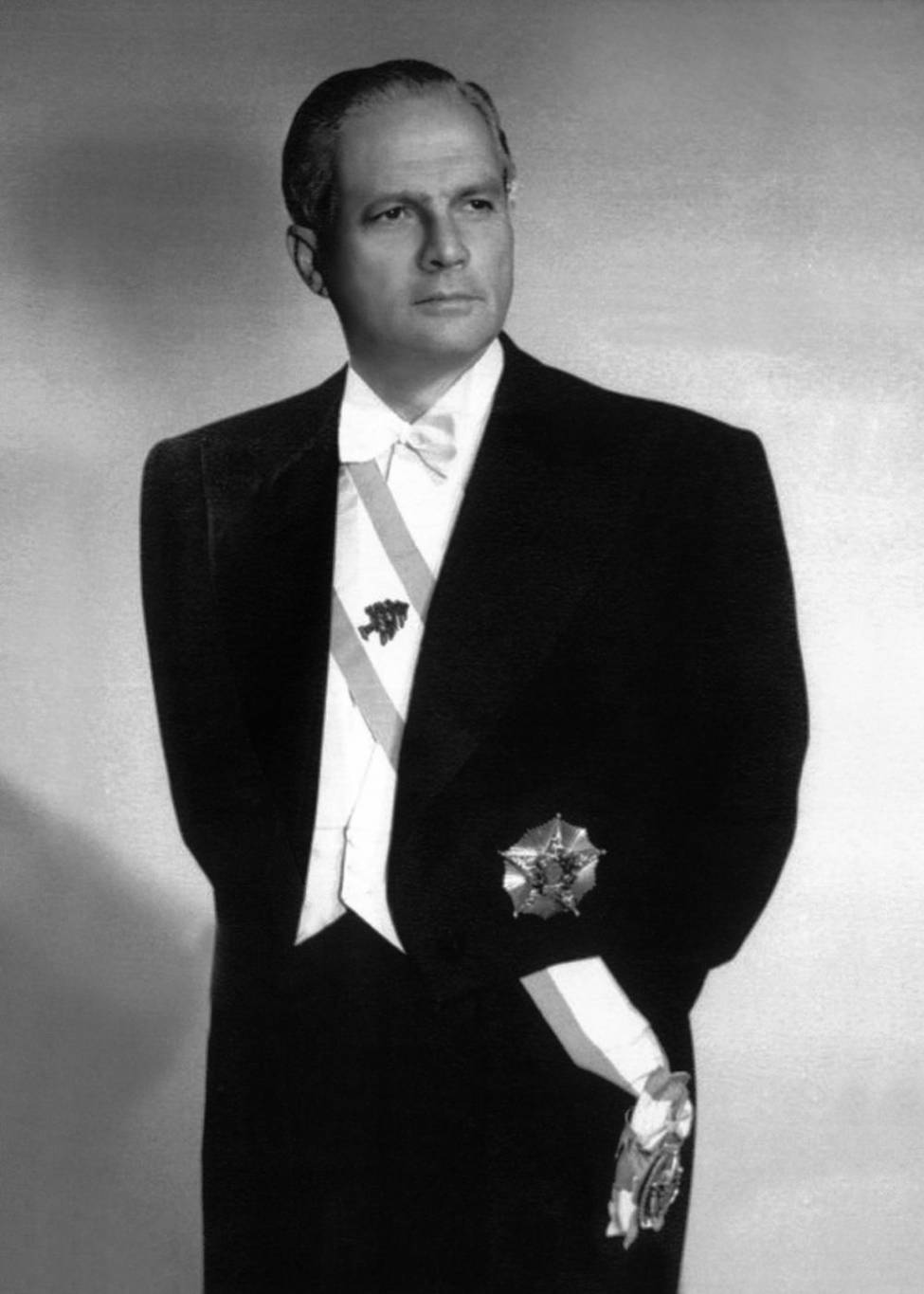
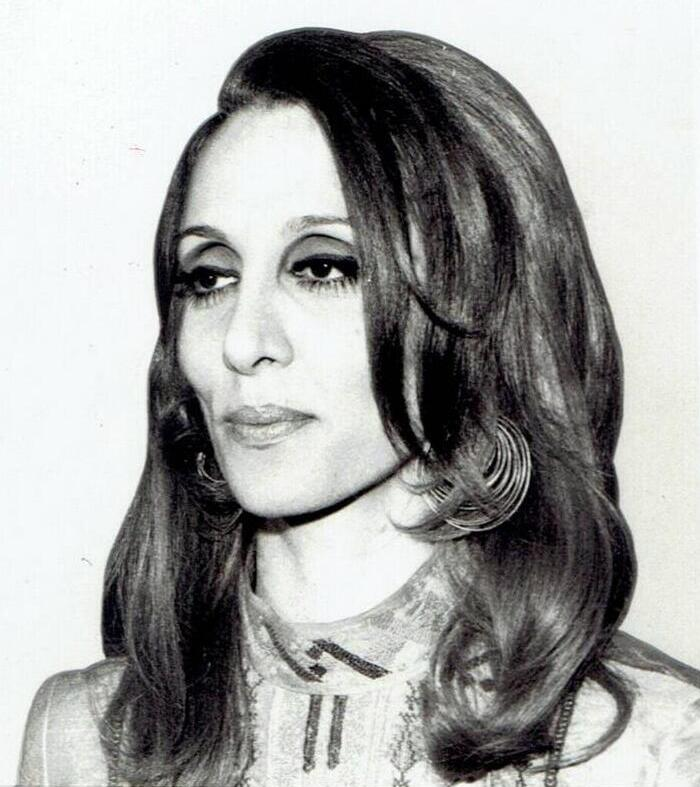
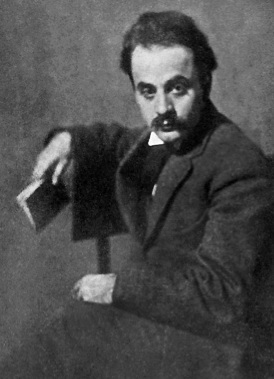
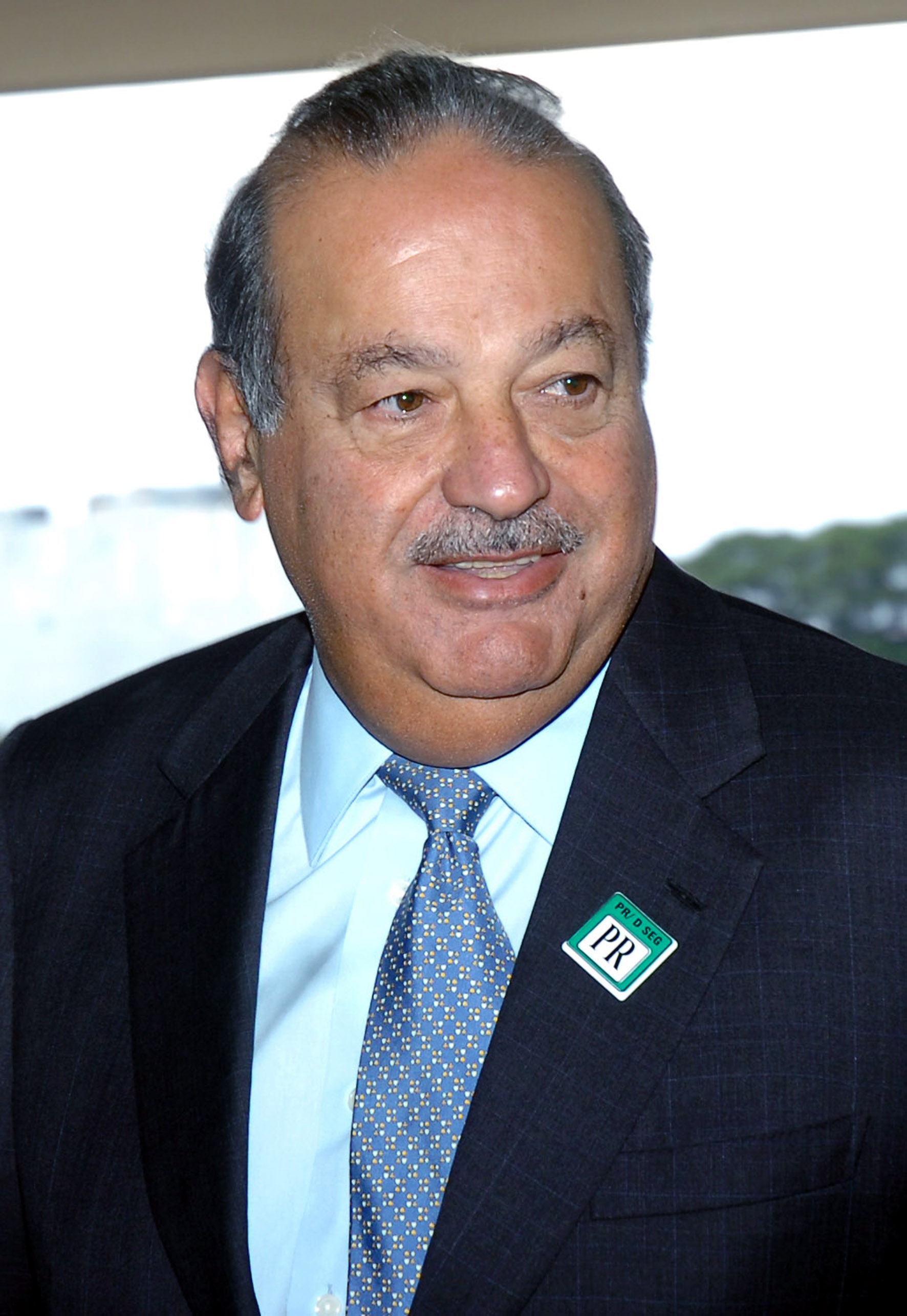
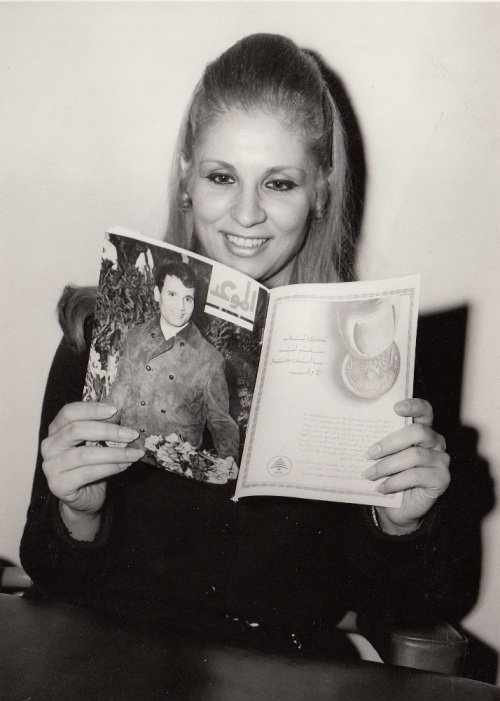
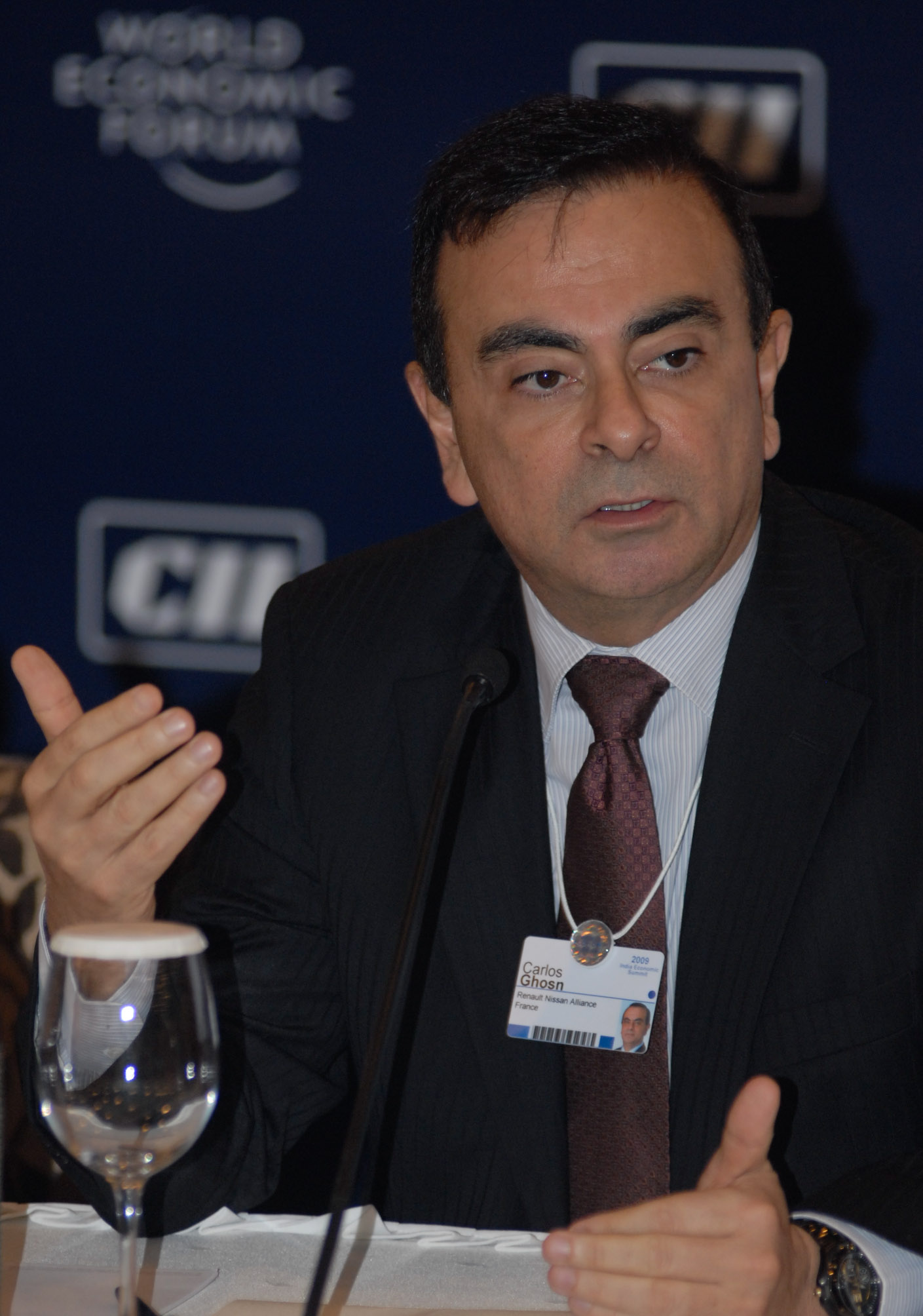
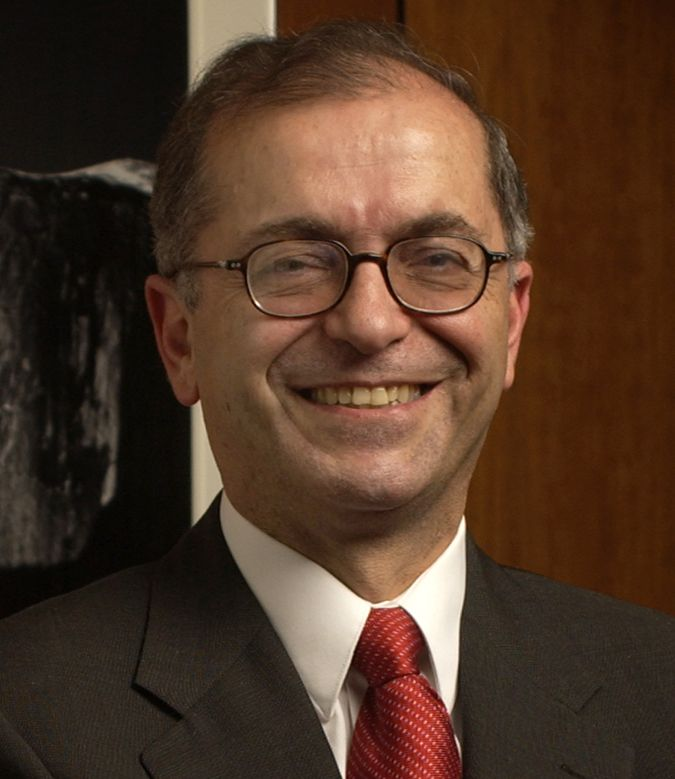
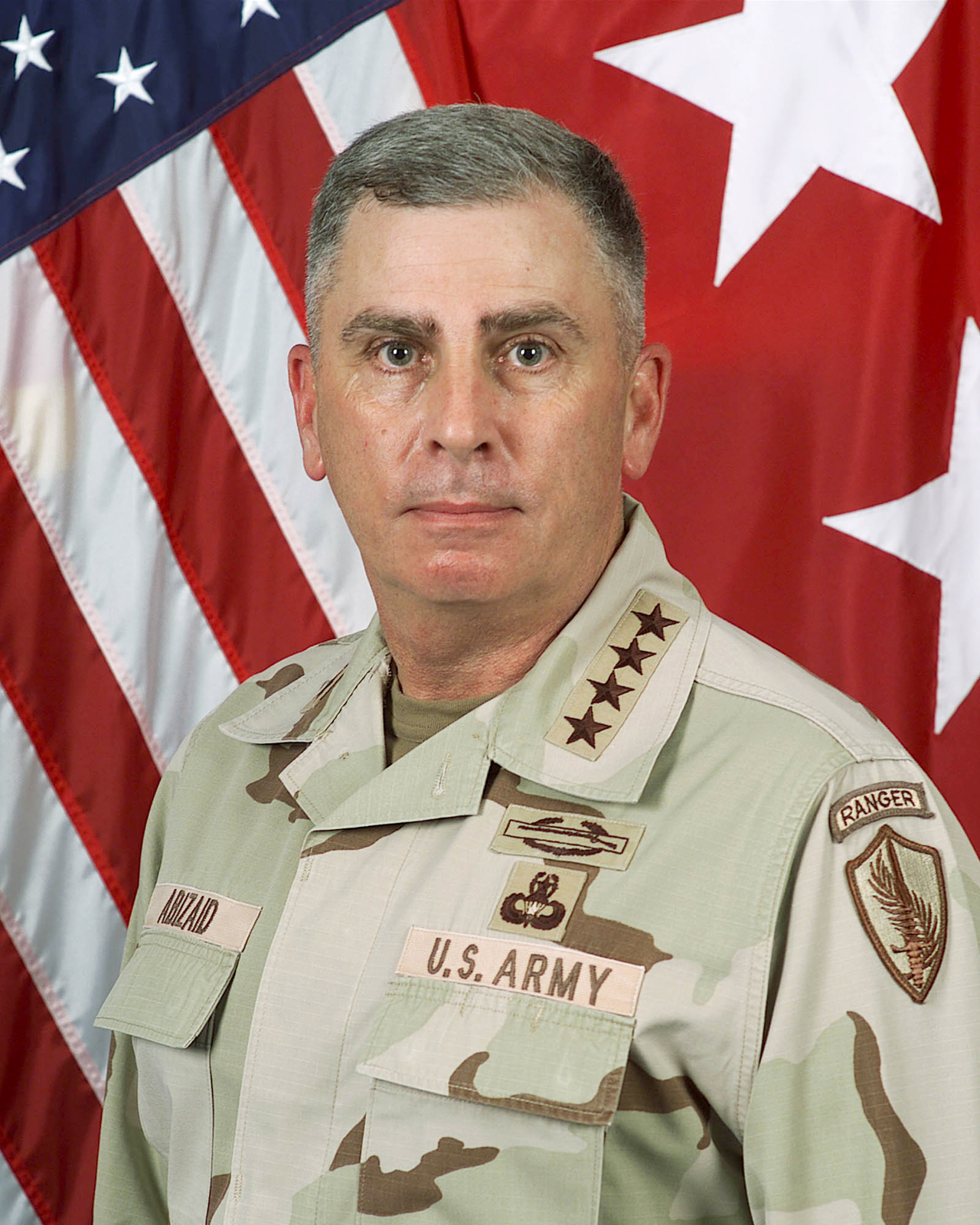
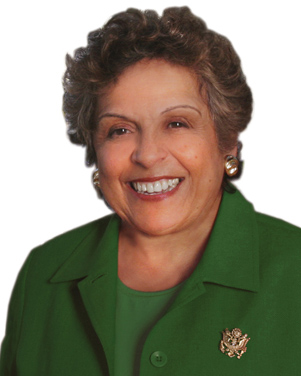
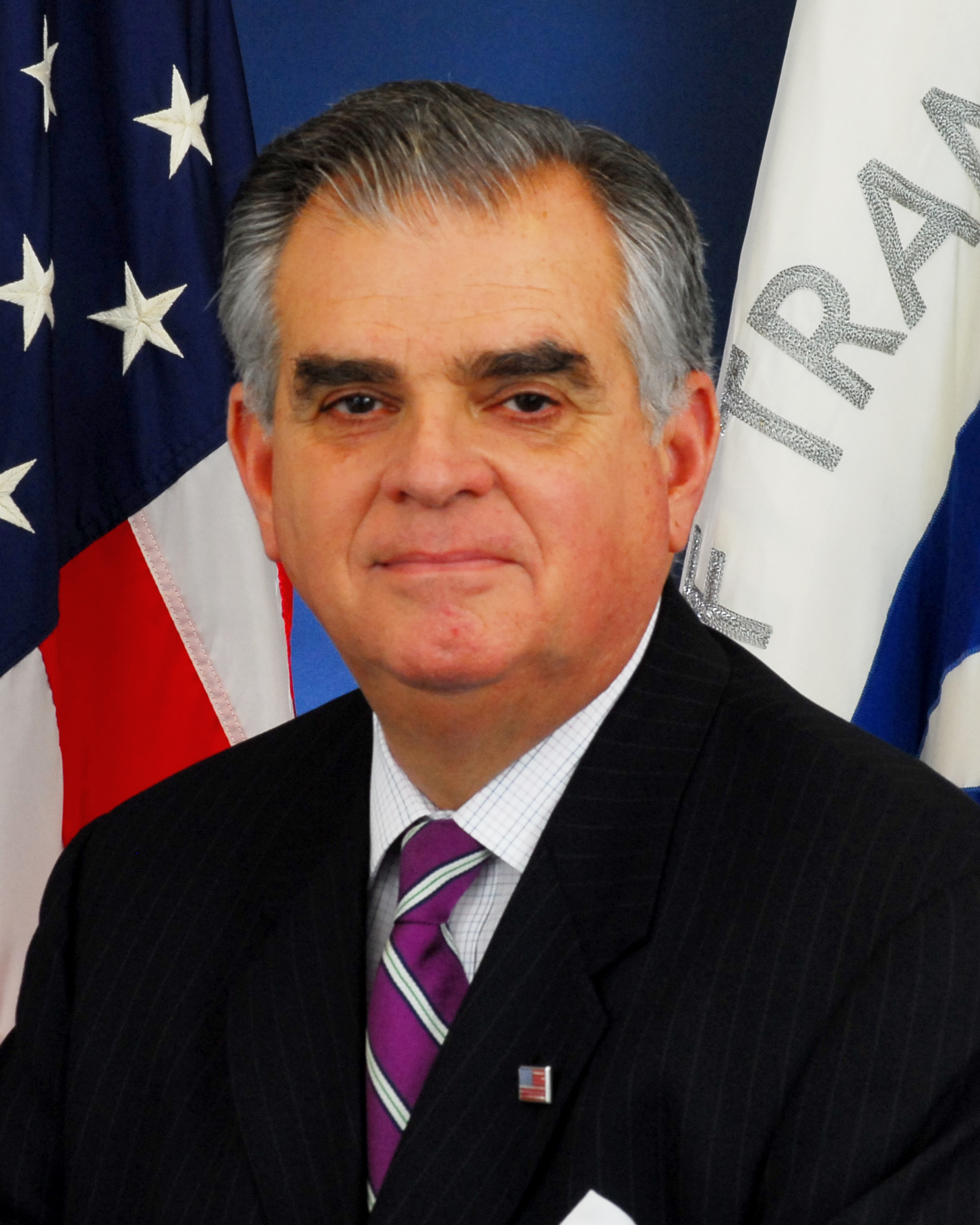
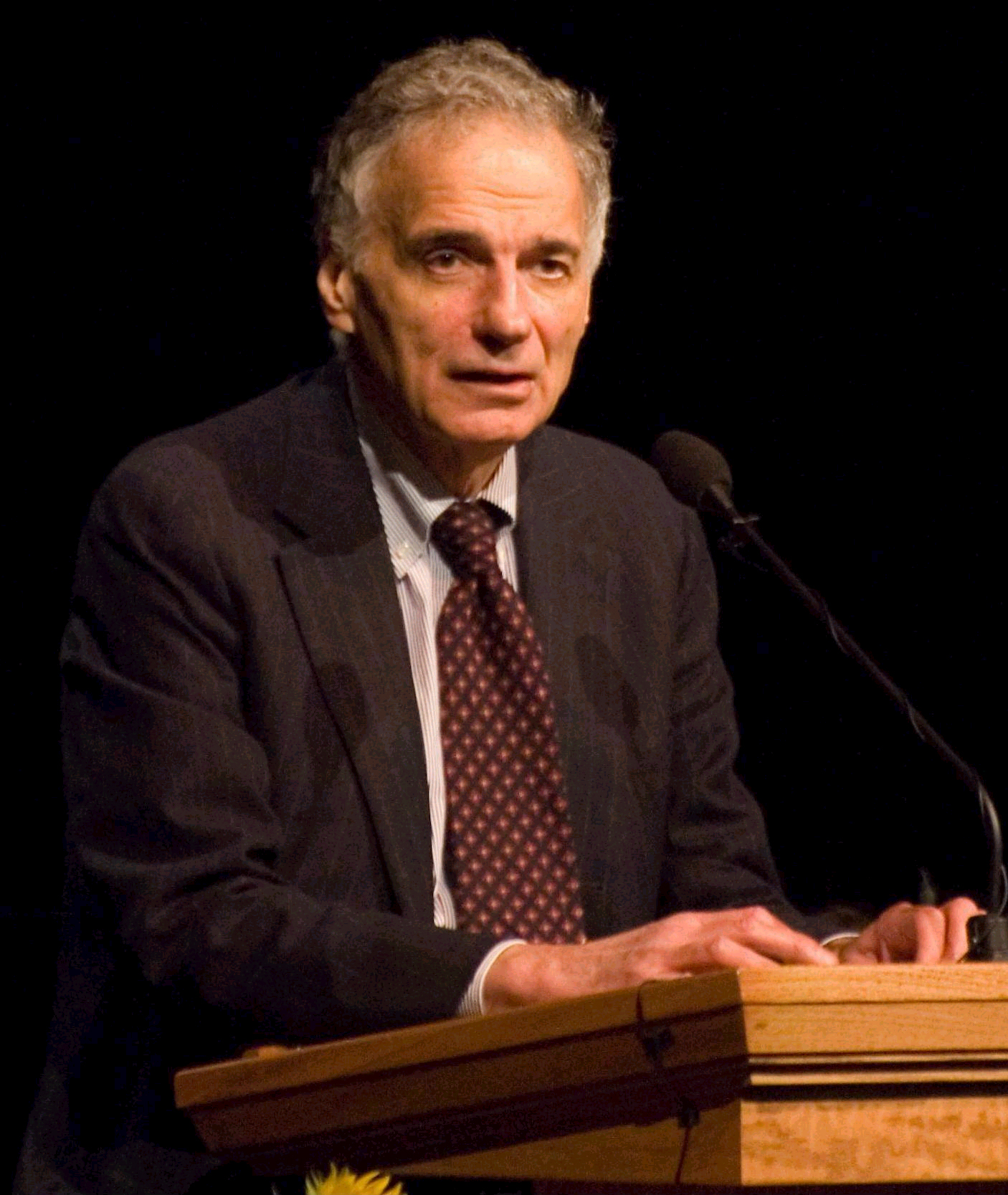
- Top row (left to right); Some of the figures are of Lebanese Descent, while others are Lebanese Citizens Charbel Makhluf • Estephan El Douaihy • Former Lebanese President Camille Chamoun • Fairuz • Khalil Gibran • Carlos Slim • Sabah • Carlos Ghosn • Charles Elachi • John Abizaid • Donna Shalala • Ray LaHood • U.S. Presidency Candidate Ralph Nader • Michel Temer • Rima Fakih •

This is a list of notable Lebanese individuals born in the Lebanese diaspora of Lebanese ancestry or people of dual Lebanese and foreign nationality who live in the diaspora.

Country listings:

== Africa ==
- Main listing: List of Lebanese people in Africa
  - List of Lebanese people in Ghana
  - List of Lebanese people in Ivory Coast
  - List of Lebanese people in Senegal
  - List of Lebanese people in Sierra Leone
  - List of Lebanese people in South Africa

== Americas ==
- List of Lebanese people in Argentina
- List of Lebanese people in Brazil
- List of Lebanese people in Canada
- List of Lebanese people in the Caribbean
  - List of Lebanese people in Curaçao
  - List of Lebanese people in Dominican Republic
  - List of Lebanese people in Haiti
  - List of Lebanese people in Jamaica
  - List of Lebanese people in Puerto Rico
- List of Lebanese people in Chile
- List of Lebanese people in Cuba
- List of Lebanese people in Colombia
- List of Lebanese people in Ecuador
- List of Lebanese people in Mexico
- List of Lebanese people in the United States
- List of Lebanese people in Uruguay
- List of Lebanese people in Venezuela

== Arab World ==
- List of Lebanese people in Egypt
- List of Lebanese people in Saudi Arabia
- List of Lebanese people in Syria
- List of Lebanese people in the United Arab Emirates

== Europe ==
- List of Lebanese people in Bulgaria
- List of Lebanese people in Cyprus
- List of Lebanese people in Denmark
- List of Lebanese people in France
- List of Lebanese people in Germany
- List of Lebanese people in Italy
- List of Lebanese people in Monaco
- List of Lebanese people in the Netherlands
- List of Lebanese people in Spain
- List of Lebanese people in Sweden
- List of Lebanese people in Switzerland
- List of Lebanese people in the United Kingdom

== Oceania ==
- List of Lebanese people in Australia

== See also ==
- List of Lebanese people
- List of Lebanon international footballers born outside Lebanon
