= Elizabeth Ayoub =

- Born: Caracas, Venezuela
- Genres: Arabic music, Latin American music, Instrumental
- Occupations: Singer, songwriter, actress
- Instruments: Guitar, Oud
- Years active: 2000–present
- Website: elizabethayoub.com

Elizabeth Ayoub is a Venezuelan singer and actress of Lebanese descent. She performs in Spanish, Arabic, English, and French, though emphasizing the Latino and Arabian music scenes. Her first album, Prelude (2006), was released via Sony BMG and was followed by Oceanos y Lunas in 2010 via Four Quarters Records, a distributed label of E1 Entertainment. Elizabeth commutes between New York City, Beirut, and Miami, where she is currently at work promoting her music and taking on new projects.

== Prelude (2006) ==
Her debut album, Prelude, was released in 2006 under Sony-BMG. The official track listing, as listed by her website elizabethayoub.com, is as follows:

1. Je T'Attends (I Wait for You)
2. Hawa (Love)
3. Navego (Drifting
4. Mr. Jones
5. Scheherazade
6. Lesh (Why)
7. Creo (I Believe)
8. Swept Away
9. Ya Oud (Oh! Oud)
10. Ya Oud (a capella)

== Oceanos y Lunas (2010) ==
In February 2009, Elizabeth announced her return to the Latin-Arabian music scene with her second album, titled Oceanos y Lunas. The album was released in May 2010 with an opening concert in New York City to promote the album. Eight new tracks were featured, along with four tracks from her debut album Prelude. The track list, according to her website, elizabethayoub.com, is as follows:

1. Oceanos y Lunas
2. Verano
3. Habibi
4. Je T'Attends (I Wait for You)
5. Creo
6. Azul
7. Pintame
8. Baeid
9. Navego
10. Deseo
11. Volver
12. Ya Oud (Oh! Oud)

== Discography ==
Prelude (2006)

Oceanos y Lunas (2010)
