= Julian Chela-Flores =

Astrobiologist

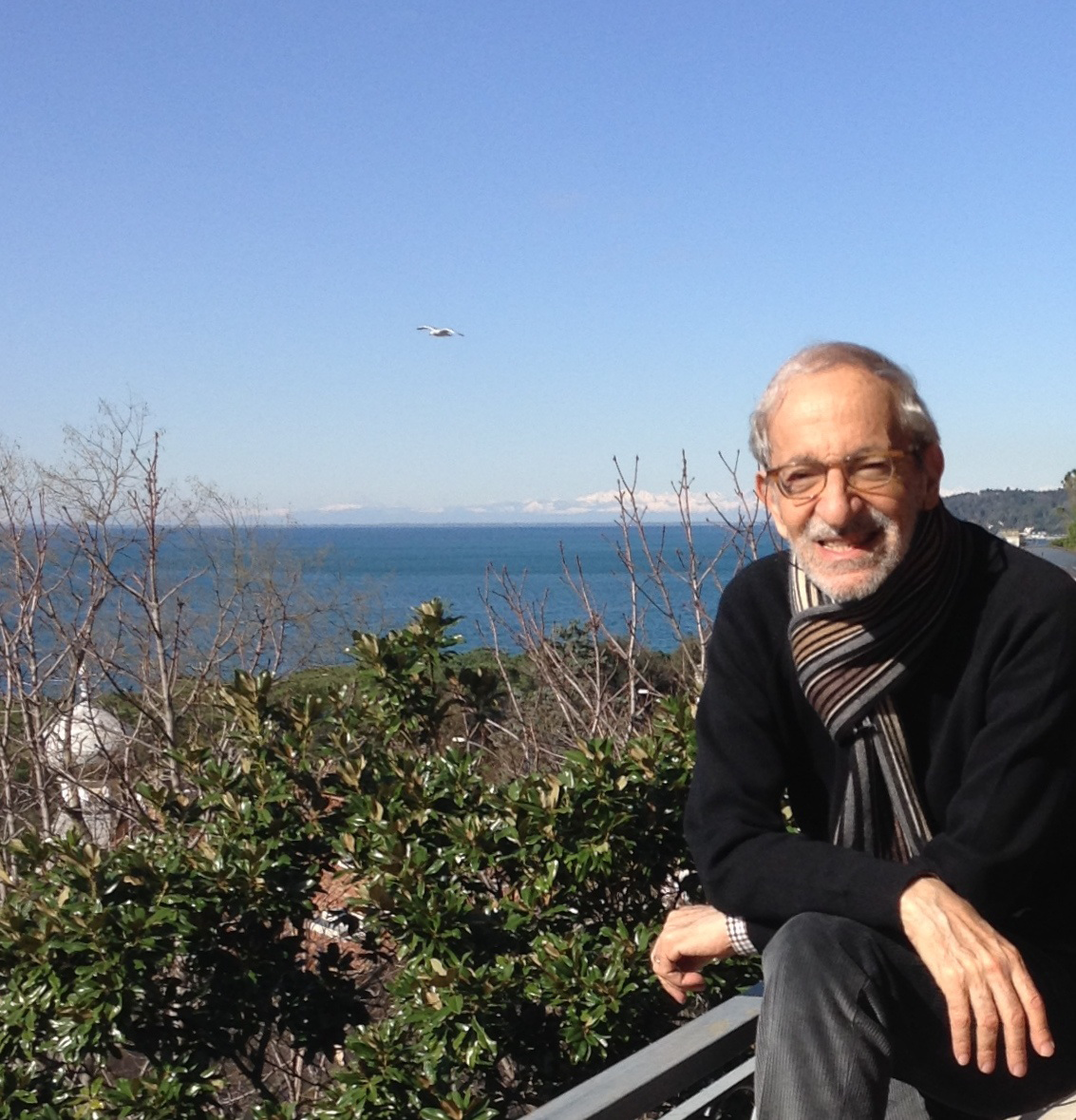
- Julian Chela-Flores at ICTP
- Born: Julian Chela-Flores; 13 June 1942 (age 82); Caracas
- Citizenship: Venezuelan
- Known for: Planetary habitability
- Scientific career
- Fields: Astrobiology; Physics
- Institutions: The Abdus Salam International Centre for Theoretical Physics

Julian Chela-Flores (born 13 June 1942) is a Venezuelan astrobiologist and physicist. He is known for his contributions to the field of planetary habitability.

== Biography ==
His father, Raimundo Chela a mathematician of Lebanese family, encouraged his studies in science, while his mother raised his interest in the humanities. He lived in England where he studied in the University of London, obtaining a PhD in Quantum Mechanics in 1969. His field of research is astrobiology, in other words the science of the origin, evolution, distribution and destiny of life in the universe, especially life on Europa, the Jovian satellite.

From 1971 till 1990 he worked in academic matters continually, especially in research at the Centre of Physics, the Venezuelan Institute for Scientific Research (Full Researcher 1978) and at the Physics Department, Simon Bolivar University (Full Professor 1980), both in Caracas. He is Full Professor ad honorem at the Institute for Advanced Studies (IDEA, Caracas) having been a co-founder of IDEA in 1980. Since 1994 he is an Associate Member of the Dublin Institute for Advanced Studies.

His first contact with the International Centre for Theoretical Physics in Trieste (ICTP, now bearing the name of its Founding Director the Nobel Laureate, Abdus Salam) took place during the inauguration of its Miramare Campus and at the Contemporary Physics Trieste Symposium (June, 1968).

These two events were stepping stones for perennial collaboration with the progress of research and development, especially in the emerging nations: IAEA Fellow 1971, and on several occasions Associate Member (1972-1981) and Visiting Scientist (1982-1990). From 1990 to 2014 he was scientist in residence at the ICTP: Scientific Consultant (1990-1996) and Staff Associate (1996-2014). He now continues his research as visiting scientist at the ICTP.

== Bibliography ==
- Ponnamperuma, C. and Chela-Flores, J. (eds.). (1993). Chemical Evolution: Origin of Life A. Deepak Publishing, Vol. 135, Hampton, Virginia, USA. (340 pp.). ISBN 093719431X.
- Chela-Flores, J., M. Chadha, A. Negron-Mendoza, and T. Oshima (eds.). (1995). Chemical Evolution: Self-Organization of the Macromolecules of Life (A Cyril Ponnamperuma Festschrift.) A. Deepak Publishing, Vol. 139, Hampton, Virginia, USA. (337 pp.). ISBN 0937194328.
- Ponnamperuma, C. and Chela-Flores, J. (eds.). (1995). Chemical Evolution: The Structure and Model of the First Cell. Kluwer Academic Publishers: Dordrecht, The Netherlands. (383 pp.). ISBN 0792335627.
- Chela-Flores, J. and Raulin, F. (eds.). (1996). Chemical Evolution: Physics of the Origin and Evolution of Life (The Cyril Ponnamperuma Memorial Conference). Kluwer Academic Publishers: Dordrecht, The Netherlands. (413 pp.). ISBN 0792341112.
- Chela-Flores, J. and Raulin, F. (eds.). (1998). Exobiology: Matter, Energy, and Information in the Origin and Evolution of Life in the Universe. Kluwer Academic Publishers: Dordrecht, The Netherlands. (386 pp.). ISBN 079235172X.
- Chela-Flores, J., Lemarchand, G.A. and Oro, J. (eds.). (2000). Astrobiology: Origins from the Big Bang to Civilisation. Kluwer Academic Publishers: Dordrecht, The Netherlands. (336 pp.). ISBN 0792365879.
- Chela-Flores, J. (2001). The New Science of Astrobiology From Genesis of the Living Cell to Evolution of Intelligent Behavior in the Universe. Kluwer Academic Publishers: Dordrecht, The Netherlands. (279 pp.). ISBN 0792371259.
- Chela-Flores, J, Owen, T. and Raulin, F. (eds.). (2001). The First Steps of Life in the Universe. Kluwer Academic Publishers: Dordrecht, The Netherlands. (428 pp.). ISBN 1402000774.
- Seckbach, J., Chela-Flores, J., Owen, T., Raulin, F. (eds.) (2004). Life in the Universe From the Miller Experiment to the Search for Life on Other Worlds Series: Cellular Origin, Life in Extreme Habitats and Astrobiology, Vol. 7, Springer: Dordrecht, The Netherlands. (387 pp.). ISBN 1402023715. (e-book) ISBN 1402023723.
- Chela-Flores, J. (2004). The New Science of Astrobiology From Genesis of the Living Cell to Evolution of Intelligent Behavior in the Universe. Series: Cellular Origin, Life in Extreme Habitats and Astrobiology, Band 3 Kluwer Academic Publishers: Dordrecht, The Netherlands. (251 pp.). Softcover edition of the 2001 book. ISBN 1402022298.
- Chela-Flores, J. (2009). A second Genesis: Stepping-stones towards the intelligibility of nature. World Scientific Publishers, Singapore. (248 pp.). ISBN 9789812835031. ISBN 9812835032.
- Chela-Flores, J. (2011). The Science of Astrobiology A Personal Point of View on Learning to Read the Book of Life (Second Edition). Book series: Cellular Origin, Life in Extreme Habitats and Astrobiology, Springer: Dordrecht, The Netherlands. (334 pp.). ISSN 1566-0400. ISBN 9789400716261. ISBN 9789400716278.

== Videography ==
In iTunes U (http://itunes.ictp.tv/)

- 3,8 billion years ago. (Also in Spanish and Italian.)
- Search for our origins in stardust. (Also in Spanish and Italian.)

In the ICTP PIO - YouTube

- A search for our origins in star dust on YouTube. (8 minutes).
- La búsqueda de nuestros orígenes en el polvo de las estrellas on YouTube. (8 minutes).
