= Alexis Khazzaka =

Lebanese footballer (born 1994)

Personal information
- Full name: Alexis Tony Louis Elie Lestiennes Khazzaka
- Date of birth: 15 April 1994 (age 32)
- Place of birth: Blois, France
- Height: 1.78 m (5 ft 10 in)
- Position: Striker

Senior career*
Years	Team	Apps	(Gls)
2012–2018	Akhaa Ahli Aley	75	(22)
Total		75	(22)

International career
2015	Lebanon U23	4	(2)
2013	Lebanon	2	(0)
- * Club domestic league appearances and goals

Alexis Tony Louis Elie Lestiennes Khazzaka (Arabic: اليكسي طوني لويس ايلي خزاقة; born 15 April 1994) is a former footballer who played as a midfielder. Born in France, he played for the Lebanon national team.

== International career ==
Khazzaka played twice for Lebanon national team in 2013. He made his competitive debut on 26 March 2013, entering as an 82nd-minute substitute in the 2014 World Cup qualifier against Uzbekistan.

Khazzaka also represented the national under-23 team at the 2016 AFC U-23 Championship qualification, scoring a brace against the Maldives.

== Personal life ==
In 2012, Khazzaka participated in "The Chance", an initiative by Nike aimed at uncovering young players around the world and giving them the possibility of being scouted by a professional club. Khazzaka passed the regional qualifiers as one of the best three players from the Middle East, and was selected among the 100 finalists. He eventually finished among the best 52 players.

== See also ==
- List of Lebanon international footballers born outside Lebanon
