= Abelardo Raidi =

Abelardo Raidi ['raɪ-dɪ] (December 25, 1914 – January 27, 2002) was a Venezuelan sportswriter and radio broadcaster. He was born in Valencia, Carabobo.

== Career ==
Raidi began his career as a radio announcer and play-by-play sports broadcaster in several stations in his country. Then, in 1941 he was the official representative of the Venezuela national baseball team which won the championship title in the IV Amateur Baseball World Series held in Havana, Cuba.

He later became an accomplished sports journalist in Caracas for almost seven decades, first at El Universal and later at El Nacional, where he turned in a sports editor and remained for more than 60 years its prestigious and widely read column Pantalla de los Jueves (Screen on Thursdays), where he also wrote with authority about boxing and golf, among other sports, and interviewed entertainment personalities as Claudia Cardinale, María Félix and Sophia Loren. Also respected as a beauty scout, he was instrumental in the participation of Maritza Sayalero and Irene Sáez in the Miss Venezuela beauty pageant, which both won, and then the Miss Universe title in 1979 and 1981, respectively.

Raidi was also a founding member of the Circle of Sports Journalists in Venezuela and earned the National Journalism Award. In addition, the International Sports Press Association (AIPS) established an award to honor him, The Abelardo Raidi Award.

Besides this, Raidi represented Zulia state in the Chamber of Deputies of Venezuela during the 1969–1974 period and the Federal District from 1974 to 1979.

== Death ==
Raidi died in 2002 in Caracas at the age of 87. The following year, he gained induction into the Venezuelan Baseball Hall of Fame and Museum as part of their first class.

== Sources ==
- Salón de la Fama del Béisbol de Venezuela – 2003 Inductees' Biographies (Spanish)
- es.Wikipedia.org – Abelardo Raidi
- AIPS America – Premio Abelardo Raidi (Spanish)
