= Obafemi =

Obafemi is both a surname and a given name. Notable people with the name include:

- Abiodun Obafemi (born 1973), Nigerian footballer
- Afolabi Obafemi (born 1994), English footballer
- Michael Obafemi (born 2000), Irish footballer
- Obafemi Anibaba, Nigerian civil servant and businessman
- Obafemi Awolowo (1909–1987), Nigerian politician and leader
- Obafemi Ayanbadejo (born 1975), American football fullback
- Obafemi Lasode (born 1955), Nigerian actor
- Obafemi Martins (born 1984), Nigerian football player
- Obafemi Obadare, Nigerian journalist

== See also ==
- Obafemi Awolowo University, a government-owned and operated Nigerian university
- Oba Femi (born 1998), Nigerian professional wrestler
