= Higher Institutions Football League =

Higher Institutions Football League (HiFL)
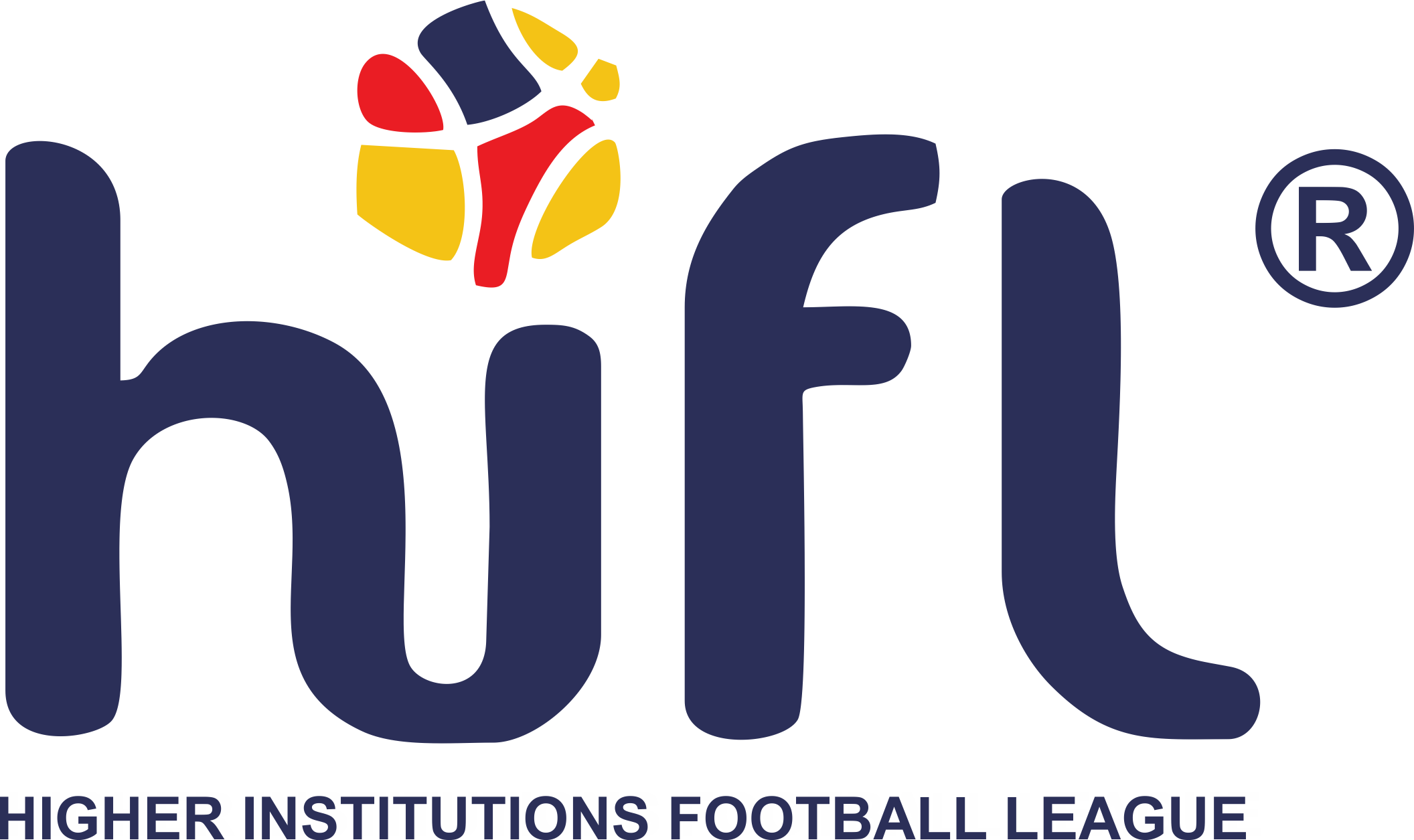
- HiFL logo
- Abbreviation: HiFL
- Formation: 2017
- Founder: PACE Sports and Entertainment Marketing Limited
- Headquarters: Lagos, Nigeria
- Location: Nigeria
- Region served: Coastal – South, Sahel – North
- Current champions: UNIMAID Desert Warriors
- Affiliations: Nigerian University Games Association, NUGA, Nigeria Football Federation, NFF
- Website: HiFL website

Higher Institutions Football League (HiFL) is an annual football competition for higher education institutions in Nigeria. The league is open to all member universities of the Nigerian University Games Association (NUGA), and all games except the Final Four are played in the campuses of participating schools. Winners of the league are scheduled to represent Nigeria at the Summer Universiade of the International University Sports Federation (FISU) games. HiFL is the football franchise of Higher Institutions Sports League (HiSL), an asset created and managed by PACE Sports and Entertainment Marketing Limited.

== History ==
HiFL, established in 2017, was launched in February 2018 as the premier franchise of the Higher Institutions Sports League (HiSL). Its first season featured an inaugural 16 universities, eight from the South (Coastal Conference) and eight from the North (Sahel Conference). The participating teams for the maiden edition were recommended by the Nigerian University Games Association (NUGA), based on recent performances in the NUGA games and government endowment. The University of Agriculture, Makurdi (UAM) Tillers emerged as the maiden winners after defeating the University of Calabar Malabites 5–4 on penalties.

The 2019 season began in late April with a qualifying round played by over 40 universities across different zones. The surviving teams joined the top four teams from the 2018 season to the final quota of 32. The 32 teams were then drawn into eight groups of four teams, and played in a round-robin system. The eight group winners (including the seeded teams from the previous year's Super Four – UAM Tillers, UNICAL Malabites, OAU Giants and UNILORIN Warriors) and eight runners-up proceeded to the knockout phase that culminated with the Super Four Finals in late October at Lagos.

Presently, the competition is only open to the male football teams of the participating universities, with the female teams to be added in subsequent editions.

== Administrative structure ==
The executive management board is tasked with the league's management in conjunction with NUGA in overseeing, enforcing and adjudicating the regulations of the competition.

The Main Organising Committee (MOC) is responsible for the operational execution and day-to-day management of the league.

Local organising committees (LOC) help organize matches on behalf of participating schools in the HiFL competition and/or qualifiers, and in close cooperation with the organizers. The minimum composition of an HiFL LOC includes representatives of the school's sports management, students’ union/association/council or representatives of the association, security services, medical services and the school's press officer.

== Regulations ==
The HiFL regulations are the statute as adopted by the Executive Management Board (EMB) that contain the basic principles and detailed rules regarding the governance of the HiFL games and competition.

In particular, they specify, based on the fundamental structure, general principles regarding the internal organisation of the MOC, LOC and EMB. They further specify the general principles regarding the duties, powers and responsibilities of certain bodies, units and other entities of HiFL, as well as of the members of those bodies.

The regulations clearly define best practices regarding the execution of the competition in its entirety.

== Format ==
The Higher Institutions Football League begins with a return-leg elimination of 16 teams. However, in the 2019 season it had 32 teams playing in a round-robin group stage. The participating universities are member institutions of NUGA. The 32 teams are then drawn into eight groups of four teams, and play in a round-robin system. The eight group winners (including the seeded teams from the previous year's Super Four) and eight runners-up proceed to the knockout phase.

For this stage, the winning team from one group plays against the runners-up from another group, in the same geographical distribution – Coastal or Sahel. This condition remains through the quarter-final and semi-final until the Super Four, where the winners from inter-conference matches battle to determine who lifts the trophy.

Generally, each school has a registration pool of 30 individuals: 26 players and four officials. However, the school's game-day team is represented by a squad of 22 individuals: 18 players and four officials. These are the coach, assistant coach, team manager, and medical officer.

The tournament uses the away goals rule: if the aggregate score of the two games is tied, then the team who scores more goals at their opponent's stadium advances.

== Brand and emblem ==
The HiFL icon is based on three distinct objects:

- Graduation cap: The angular shape reflects a graduation cap or "mortarboard". This helps to visually restate the mission of HiFL to support the passion of youths, especially those in academia.
- Football: The geometric pattern on the logo is inspired by those on a football.
- Ankara: The icon gains its dynamic and lively color from the vibrant hues of the African wax print popularly called "Ankara". This emphasizes the essence and ownership of the brand as African.

== Trophy and medals ==
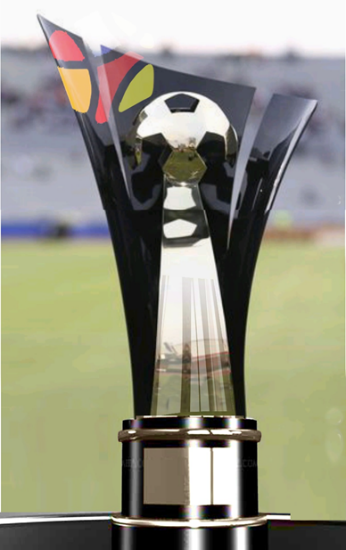
HiFL Trophy

The HiFL Champions Cup, also known as the Ultimate trophy, is awarded at the end of each season to the team that wins the HiFL Competition. The trophy remains in HiFL's keeping and ownership at all times. A full-size replica trophy is awarded to each winner of the competition. In the 2019 season, the UAM Tillers enjoyed the distinction of wearing the logo of the league set on a gold background for the duration of the 2019 season. The UNICAL Malabites will enjoy this distinction as the current league winners.

A club that wins three consecutive times or five times overall will receive a multiple-winner badge.

== Theme song ==
The official HiFL theme song, "Game Changers", was written by Rocketshop, one of the project's commercial partners and recorded by pop star Kola Soul in May 2018. It was officially released as part of the build-up towards the 2018 HiFL season in a cover song competition, #TheHiFLChallenge, to much fanfare.

The anthem is played before every HiFL game at a stadium hosting such an event, and also before and after every television broadcast of a HiFL game.

== Conferences ==
The conferences for HiFL are structured along Nigeria's regional lines: the North and the South.

The North, called the Sahel Conference, includes higher institutions from states such as Adamawa, Bauchi, Benue, Borno, F.C.T – Abuja, Gombe, Jigawa, Kaduna, Kano, Katsina, Kebbi, Kogi, Kwara, Nasarawa, Niger, Plateau, Sokoto, Taraba, Yobe and Zamfara.

The South, known as the Coastal Conference, includes higher institutions from states such as Abia, Akwa Ibom, Anambra, Bayelsa, Cross River, Delta, Ebonyi, Edo, Ekiti, Enugu, Imo, Lagos, Ogun, Ondo, Osun, Oyo and Rivers.

== 2018 season summary ==
In the 2018 season, the teams were divided into two groups of four across two conferences: Coastal (South) and Sahel (North). They played in return leg elimination style across four stages: preliminaries, quarter-finals, semi-finals, and Final Four, where the two winners from each of the conferences battle for the prize.

Qualification for the 2018 HiFL competition was open to all member universities of NUGA. However, the participating universities for the maiden edition were selected based on strong sporting/academic parameters and government endowment.

The following table lists the participating schools by conference and in alphabetical order.

Coastal Conference

| Institution | Location | Nickname | Colours |
|---|---|---|---|
| Delta State University, Abraka | Delta State | DELSU Titans | Sky blue and white |
| Obafemi Awolowo University, Ile-Ife | Osun State | OAU Giants | Blue and yellow |
| University of Benin | Edo State | UNIBEN Royals | Purple and gold |
| University of Calabar | Cross River State | UNICAL Malabites | Blue and red |
| University of Ibadan | Oyo State | UI Pioneers | Indigo (blue) and gold |
| University of Lagos | Lagos State | UNILAG Marines | Gold and puce |
| University of Nigeria, Nsukka | Enugu State | UNN Lions | Green and white |
| University of Port Harcourt | Rivers State | UNIPORT Sharks | Blue and white |

Sahel Conference

| Institution | Location | Nickname | Colours |
|---|---|---|---|
| Abubakar Tafawa Balewa University | Bauchi State | ATBU Bravehearts | Blue and green |
| Ahmadu Bello University (ABU) | Kaduna State | ABU Nobles | Sky blue, white and green |
| Bayero University, Kano | Kano State | BUK Stallions | Sky blue, black and white |
| University of Agriculture, Makurdi | Benue State | UAM Tillers | Green, red and gold |
| University of Ilorin | Kwara State | UNIILORIN Warriors | Purple, green, white and gold |
| University of Jos | Plateau State | UNIJOS Highlanders | White, green, blue, brown and gold |
| University of Maiduguri | Borno State | UNIMAID Desert Warriors | Blue and white |
| Usmanu Danfodiyo University, Sokoto | Sokoto State | UDU Sultans | Green and purple |

The 2018 HiFL season was marked by top quality and attacking football, excellent players and a positive general football philosophy. The teams' objectives were to score and win matches instead of trying not to lose or concede. This led to a glut of goals, 63 in total, at an impressive average of 2.1 goals per match.

The tournament also witnessed the rise and development of teams such as DELSU Titans and UDU Sultans, who efficiently challenged the more established teams. Many matches were end-to-end affairs, and a lot of games were not decided until the very end.

Moreover, the league was an extremely balanced affair. Most of the matches in the competition went down to the wire, and the odd case penalties separated the teams, like in the final where UAM Tillers defeated UNICAL Malabites 5-4 to be crowned champions.

=== 2018 season duration ===
The 2018 season ran from 28 July 2018 to 3 November 2018.

=== Tournament ===
The teams are divided into groups of eight across two conferences: Coastal (South) and Sahel (North).

- Preliminaries: The eight teams across each pool are further divided into groups A and B, giving Coastal A & B and Sahel A & B. The teams are paired off to play return-leg elimination games to determine the quarter-finalists.
- Quarter-finals: The winners after the first round square off for a chance to qualify to the next round.
- Semi-finals: The quarter-final winners pair off against the winners for a chance to play in the HiFL championship game.
- Final Four: The final and third place matches are held at the Teslim Balogun Stadium in Lagos.

=== Hosting ===
For the 2018 season of the competition, each of the participating institutions had the opportunity to host at least one game, after which they then travelled to play the corresponding fixture in the 'home' of their opponent to determine the winner of the series. This system was designed to ensure maximum participation and engagement for students across all the participating schools.

=== 2018 HiFL Elite Awards ===
The HiFL Elite Awards is an annual football award presented by Higher Institutions Football League (HiFL). It was first presented in 2018 as part of a series of events to commemorate the close of the inaugural season, to recognize and celebrate outstanding performers in the league.

==== HiFL Elite Player of the Year ====
| Rank | Name | Team |
|---|---|---|
| Winner | Ebuka David Odenigbo | UAM Tillers |
| - | Charles Ufot | UNICAL Malabites |
| - | Olumofe Seyi James | OAU Giants |
| - | Ogunronbi Hawal | UNILORIN Warriors |

==== HiFL Elite Coach of the Year ====
| Rank | Name | Team |
|---|---|---|
| Winner | Priscilla Mlumun Vande | UAM Tillers |
| - | Moshood Jimoh Oyefolarin | UNICAL Malabites |
| - | Egbunu Olimene A. C | OAU Giants |
| - | Isiaka Gambari | UNILORIN Warriors |

==== HiFL Elite Goalkeeper of the Year ====
| Rank | Name | Team |
|---|---|---|
| Winner | Ebire Abiodun | OAU Giants |
| - | Okorie Okechukwu | UNICAL Malabites |
| - | Terungwa Toradza | UAM Tillers |
| - | Abdulhakeem Yahaya | UNILORIN Warriors |

==== HiFL Elite Goal of the Year ====
| Rank | Name | Team |
|---|---|---|
| Winner | Agbomeji Abdul Wahab Omotayo | LASU Blazzers |
| - | Okorie Okechukwu | UNICAL Malabites |
| - | Abata Terkuma | UAM Tillers |
| - | Abdulhakeem Yahaya | UNILORIN Warriors |

==== HiFL Elite Host of the Year ====
| Rank | Name | Team |
|---|---|---|
| Winner | Obafemi Awolowo University | OAU Giants |
| - | Bayero University, Kano | BUK Stallions |
| - | University of Calabar | UNICAL Malabites |
| - | University of Port Harcourt | UNIPORT Sharks |

==== HiFL Elite Goal Scorer of the Year ====
| Rank | Name | Team |
|---|---|---|
| Winner | Ebuka David Odenigbo | UAM Tillers |

==== HiFL Elite Platinum Award ====
| Rank | Name |
|---|---|
| Winner | Professor Adamu Abubakar Rasheed (mni, MFR, FNAL) (executive secretary of the NUC) |

== 2019 season summary ==
The 2019 season was expanded to include 32 university teams playing 66 games over 21 weeks to determine the winner of the Ultimate Champions Trophy. The season ran from April to October 2019, and culminated with the Super Four on 26 October at the Lagos Agege Stadium.

The 2019 season featured a brand-new system including a group stage of 32 teams, divided into eight groups across the two conferences. Seeding was used in making the draw for this stage, and teams were drawn in groups together with respect to their geographical locations. The winning team and the runners-up from each group then progressed to the Round of 16 to join the 2018 Super Four teams (UAM Tillers, UNICAL Malabites, OAU Giants and UNILORIN Warriors) from the previous year, which gained automatic qualification.

For this stage, the winning team from one group played against the runners-up from another group, in the same geographical distribution – Coastal or Sahel. This condition remained through the quarter-final and semi-final until the Super Four. where the winners from inter-conference matches battled to determine who would win the trophy. The 2019 format retained the use of away goals rule to determine the winners in the knockout stage.

The following table lists the participating schools of the 2019 season in alphabetical order.

2019 season
| Categories | Participating schools |
|---|---|
| 2018 Super Four - 4 | Obafemi Awolowo University; University of Agriculture, Umudike; University of Calabar; University of Ilorin |
| Qualifiers - 24 | Abubakar Tafawa Balewa University, Bauchi; Adekunle Ajasin University, Akungba; Ahmadu Bello University, Zaria; Bayero University, Kano; Benue State University, Markudi; Delta State University, Abraka; Ekiti State University; Enugu State University; Federal University Ndufu Alike Ikwo; Federal University of Technology, Akure; Federal University of Technology, Minna; Federal University Oye, Ekiti; Ignatius Ajuru University of Education, Port Harcourt; Kano State University of Science and Technology, Wudil; Lead City University; Lagos State University; Michael Okpara University of Agriculture, Umudike; Nasarawa State University, Keffi; Nnamdi Azikiwe University, Awka; Plateau State University; Rivers State University, Port Harcourt; University of Benin; University of Maiduguri; University of Uyo |
| Wild Cards - 4 | Niger Delta University; Nile University; University of Ibadan; University of Lagos |

=== 2019 season duration ===
The season ran from April to October 2019, and culminated with the Super Four on 26 October at the Lagos Agege Stadium.

=== Tournament ===
The 2019 HiFL season saw improvements in technical and tactical play, given that some coaches were tutored by coaches from Manchester City during the Pre-League Coaching Clinic organised in partnership with Premier Cool.

Most of the teams started to play off from the back: only 19 percent of passes were played long in the 2019 tournament, a decrease from the previous edition, which suggests that teams were progressively looking to play shorter passes and build patiently, as opposed to going long and direct. There were no underdogs, as newer teams such as KUST Pyramids and FUTA Tigerssuccessfully and efficiently challenged the more established teams. 122 goals were scored in total, at an average of 1.9 goals per match.

In the final, UNICAL Malabites defeated the defending champions, UAM Tillers, 5-4, on penalties after regulation time to be crowned champions.

=== Hosting ===
Each of the participating institutions hosted at least one home game, and travelled to play the corresponding fixture in the 'home' of their opponent to determine the winner of the series. This system is designed to ensure maximum participation and engagement for students across all the participating schools.

In the new format for the 2019 season, there were 24 host institutions, including eight group stage hosts after which it reverts to the 2018 hosting format in the knockout stages.

=== 2019 HiFL Elite Awards ===
The HiFL Elite Awards is a continuation from the first edition in 2018 as part of a series of events to commemorate the close of the inaugural season, to recognize and celebrate outstanding performers in the league.

The HiFL Fair Play Award was introduced in the 2019 event.

Below is the list of nominees and winners in each category.

==== HiFL Elite Player of the Year ====
| Rank | Name | Team |
|---|---|---|
| Winner | Assen Shater | UAM Tillers |
| - | Odey Santus | UNICAL Malabites |
| - | Adeyemi Opeyemi | OAU Giants |
| - | Ogungbenro Mustapha | UNILORIN Warriors |

==== HiFL Elite Coach of the Year ====
| Rank | Name | Team |
|---|---|---|
| Winner | Moshood Jimoh Oyefolarin | UNICAL Malabites |
| - | Priscilla Vande | UAM Tillers |
| - | Isiaka Gambari | UNILORIN Warriors |
| - | Egbunu Olimene | OAU Giants |

==== HiFL Elite Goal of the Year ====
| Rank | Name | Game |
|---|---|---|
| Winner | Jehu Billyok | ATBU Bravehearts vs UNIMAID Desert Warriors |
| - | Asen Shater | OAU Giants vs UAM Tillers |
| - | Prosper Edehwor | UNILORIN Warriors vs UNIBEN Royals |
| - | Joseph Adama | UNIMAID Desert Warriors vs ABU Nobles |

==== HiFL Elite Host of the Year ====
| Rank | Name |
|---|---|
| Winner | Obafemi Awolowo University |
| - | University of Calabar |
| - | Lagos State University |
| - | University of Uyo |

==== HiFL Elite Team of the Season ====
Team formation is 4-3-3.

| Name | Team | Position number |
|---|---|---|
| Terungwa Toradza | UAM Tillers | 1 |
| Oyewumi Oluwadamilare | UNILORIN Warriors | 3 |
| Ajao Sodiq | UNILORIN Warriors | 5 |
| Ujah Christian | UNICAL Malabites | 2 |
| Ikponmwosa Osarumwen | UNICAL Malabites | 6 |
| Toheeb Adebayo | OAU Giants | 4 |
| Ogungbenro Mustapha | UNILORIN Warriors | 8 |
| Mojafu-Ekpang Ngaji | UNICAL Malabites | 10 |
| Asen Shater | UAM Tillers | 9 |
| Odey Santus | UNICAL Malabites | 11 |
| Adeyemi Opeyemi | OAU Giants | 7 |

==== HiFL Elite Platinum Award ====
The 2019 distinguished honorary award went to:

| Rank | Name |
|---|---|
| Winner | Dr. Demola Sogunle (CEO, StanbicIBTC Bank Plc) |

==== HiFL Fair Play Award ====
This award is in recognition of exemplary behaviour and outstanding acts of sportsmanship.

| Rank | Name |
|---|---|
| Winner | Professor Ozo-Mekuri Ndimele (vice chancellor, Ignatius Ajuru University of Education) |

== 2020 season summary ==
Due to the global COVID-19 pandemic, HiFL was organized in form of e-sports. HiFL, in partnership with La Liga, introduced a virtual football league experience involving the nation's top universities, called the HiFL eINVITATIONAL. The league involved gamers across eight universities in Nigeria.

Winner

LEADCITY Gladiators

Runners up

FUTA Tigers

Despite the constraints on general gatherings to help curb the spread of COVID-19, HHiFL joined the rest of the world in celebrating the first-ever International Day of University Sport.

== 2021 season summary ==
In the 2021 season, the teams were divided into five groups of varying numbers across five zones: Bayero University Kano, Federal University of Technology Minna (FUTMINNA), Lagos State University (LASU), University of Benin (UNIBEN), University of Uyo, and Akwa Ibom (UNIUYO). They played in return leg elimination style across four stages: round of 16, quarter-finals, semi-finals and Final Four.

The competition was open to all member universities of NUGA, and the participating schools emerged after a round of qualifiers.

=== List of the participating schools by zones ===
Zone A
- Bayero University Kano
- Kogi State University
- Abubakar Tafawa Balewa University, Bauchi
- University of Maiduguri
- Kano University of Science and Technology, Wudil
Zone B
- Federal University of Technology, Minna
- Ahmadu Bello University, Zaria
- Federal University of Lokoja
- Benue State University
Zone C

Pot 1

- Lagos State University
- Ladoke Akintola University of Technology
- University of Lagos

Pot 2

- Federal University of Technology, Akure
- Olabisi Onabanjo University, Ago Iwoye
- Afe Babalola University, Ado-Ekiti
Zone D
- University of Benin
- Federal University of Petroleum Resources
- Niger Delta University
- Federal University Oye Ekiti
- Adekunle Ajasin University
Zone E
- University of Uyo
- Ignatius Ajuru University Of Education
- University of Nigeria
- Alex Ekwueme Federal University Ndufu Alike Ikwo
- Nnamdi Azikwe University

=== 2021 season duration ===
The 2021 season ran from 20 April 2021 to 10 October 2021.

=== Tournament ===
Qualifiers stage / group stage

The 25 teams were divided into five zones. The teams were paired to play each other at least once. The winning team and the runners-up from each group progressed to the next round.

Knockout stage

Immediately after the qualifiers stage, HiFL 2021 draws took place in order to determine the next stages of the competition. The draw is entirely random. The knockout ties are played in a two-legged format, with the exception of the final.

Super Four finals

The final and third place matches were held at Yaba College of Technology Sports Complex in Lagos. The games involve the winners and losers from the semi-final matches doing battle for the trophy and the runners up spots.

Hosting

In the 2021 season, each of the participating institutions had the opportunity to host at least one game, and then travelled to play the corresponding fixture in the 'home' of their opponent to determine the winner of the series. This system was designed to ensure maximum participation and engagement for students across all the participating schools.

2021 HiFL Elite Awards

The HiFL Elite Awards is an annual football award presented by Higher Institutions Football League (HiFL). It was first presented in 2018 as part of a series of events to commemorate the close of the inaugural season to recognize and celebrate outstanding performers in the league.

| Award category | Winners |
|---|---|
| HiFL Elite Player of the year | Suleiman Ali Saleh |
| HiFL Elite Coach of the year | Dauda Daniel Ziko |
| HiFL Elite Host of the year | University of Ilorin |
| Highest Goal Scorer | Suleiman Ali Saleh |
| HiFL Goal of the season | Adekimoye Omotayo |
| HiFL Platinum Award | Mr Aderemi Ogunpitan |
| HiFL Dr. Nike Igbokwe Awards for FairPlay | LASU Blazers |

The HiFL Elite Team of the Season

Team formation is 3-4-3.

| Name | Team |
|---|---|
| Isaac Philips | AAUA Luminaries |
| Oche David | UNIMAID Desert Warriors |
| Emeka Alex | UNN Lions |
| Akinwale Oluwabukunmi | AAUA Luminaries |
| Abdul-khalil Nurudeen | AAUA Luminaries |
| Anichebe Elvis | UNN Lions |
| Usman Abubakar Sani | UNIMAID Desert Warriors |
| Ndah Noble | FUTMINNA Transformers |
| Oche Francis | UNIMAID Desert Warriors |
| Suleiman Ali Saleh | UNIMAID Desert Warriors |
| Adekimoye Omotayo | AAUA Luminaries |
