= Tinuade Sanda =

Nigerian business leader (born 1979)

Tinuade Toyin Sanda
- Education: Obafemi Awolowo University, Edinburgh Business School, Heriot-Watt University, Scotland and Fellow Institute of Chartered Accountants of Nigeria, Institute of Consulting, Institute of Directors, Institute of Professional Financial Managers
- Occupations: Founder of EmHERging a mentorship platform and Former Managing Director/Chief Executive Officer of EKo Electricity Distribution Company (EKEDC)

Tinuade Toyin Sanda (born 6 August 1979) is a Nigerian executive business leader, founder of EmHERging a mentorship platform and former chief executive officer of EKo Electricity Distribution Company (EKEDC), the largest distribution company in sub–Saharan Africa.

She was awarded by Nigerian Books of Record for her contributions to the Nigeria power sector and also Africa Safety Award for Excellence (AfriSAFE).

She is listed among the five most influential women in Nigeria and was a key member of the privatisation team that examined Eko Electricity Distribution's finances and taxes and ascended through the ranks to become chief finance officer and chief treasury officer before being named the Disco's first female managing director.

== Education ==
Tinuade holds a degree in accounting from the Obafemi Awolowo University, Ile-Ife. She obtained a Master's in Business Administration specializing in Strategic Planning from the Edinburgh Business School, Heriot-Watt University, Scotland, UK. In 2020, ICON University of Management Science & Technology, Benin Republic awarded her Doctor of Philosophy in Financial Management & Entrepreneurship.

== Career ==
Tinuade Sanda is the first female to be appointed as managing director in the history of the electricity sector in Nigeria. She worked within the banking sector Prior to joining EKEDC in 2013, she was head, finance and administration at Vanguard Energy Resources. She was part of the team that led the acquisition of EKO Disco.

In 2023, she contributed to Nigeria's highest ever monthly collections of 16 billion Naira, the lowest ever ATC & C losses of 15.69% in the power sector and In recognition for contributions to the sustainability sector she was invited by The Women in the Sustainable Economy (WISE), launched by Vice President of the United States Kamala Harris, as part of the Biden-Harris administration's efforts to advance the 2023 Asia-Pacific Economic Cooperation (APEC).

She initiated the launch of a fast-delivery mass metering programme (Mobile MAP Initiative) in Nigeria, resulting in the delivery of over 80,832 electricity meters and also the purchase of statistical meters for monitoring all existing feeders, which effectively reduces losses.

Tinuade is a member of the power- subcommittee for the president of the Federal Republic of Nigeria. She participates in the electricity market and is a member of the president power sub-committee of the Association of Nigerian Electricity Distributors (ANED), where her innovative ideas have led to positive changes introduced in the financial processes and systems of participants in the power sector.

== Professional and Membership ==
She is a fellow of the Institute of Directors Institute of Chartered Accountants of Nigeria, Institute of Credit Management Administration, Institute of Consulting and Institute of Professional Financial Managers, United Kingdom. She is also an associate member of Risk Management Association of Nigeria.

== Award and Recognition ==
She was awarded by Nigerian Books of Record, the Africa Safety Award for Excellence (AfriSAFE) as CEO Of the Year (2022) and The Peak Performing (TPP) Award - CEO of The Year.
