= Charles Allen, Baron Allen of Kensington =

British businessman and broadcaster (born 1957)

The Right Honourable The Lord Allen of Kensington CBE
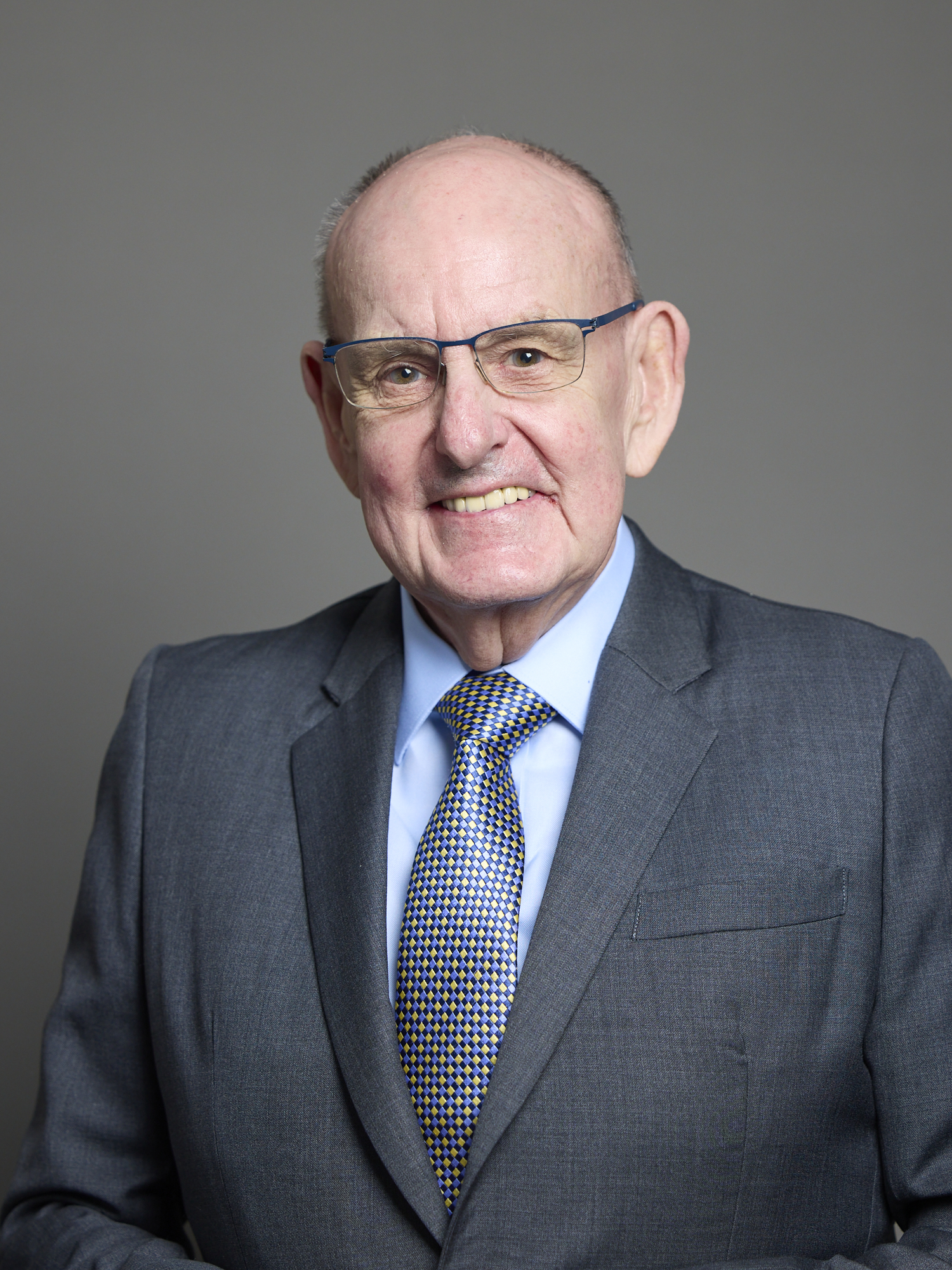
- Official portrait, 2025

Member of the House of Lords
- Lord Temporal
- Life peerage 2 October 2013

Personal details
- Born: 4 January 1957 (age 69) Lanarkshire, Scotland
- Party: Labour
- Occupation: CEO of Granada Group (1996–2000); Non-exec. director of Tesco plc (1999–2010); Exec. chairman of Granada Media plc (2000–04); CEO of ITV plc (2004–07); Chairman of Global Media & Entertainment (2007–present); Exec. chairman of EMI (2008–10); Chairman of Executive Board of the Labour Party (March 2012-2015); Chairman of British Red Cross (2013–2014); Chairman of ISS A/S (2013–2021); Chairman of Balfour Beatty (2021–present); Chairman of Invictus Games (2020–present); Chairman of THG plc (2022–present)

Charles Lamb Allen, Baron Allen of Kensington (born 4 January 1957) is a British businessman, broadcaster, and chairman of Balfour Beatty, Invictus Games, THG plc, Global Radio and Advisory chairman at Moelis & Company. Lord Allen was chief executive of Granada Group from 1996 to 2000, executive chairman of Granada Media plc from 2000 to 2004, chief executive of ITV plc from its formation in 2004 until 2007, and chairman of the music company EMI. He was chairman of Endemol, 2 Sisters Food Group and ISS, a non-executive director of Tesco and Virgin Media. In March 2012, he was appointed by Ed Miliband, the leader of the Labour Party, to the position of chairman of the executive board of the party. He has been chairman of the British Red Cross.

== Education ==
Allen was educated at Bellshill Academy, a state school in the town of Bellshill in North Lanarkshire in central Scotland. He did not attend university, and says of his life, "It's been an amazing journey considering I left school at 17 with no job to go to".

== Career ==
Allen joined Granada plc in 1991, originally as CEO of Granada Television, before becoming Group Chief Executive in 1996. During his time at Granada, he was instrumental in the takeover of Forte Group for £3.9 billion in 1996, and the takeovers of LWT and Yorkshire-Tyne Tees Television in 1994 and 1999 respectively. In 2001 Granada Group merged with Compass to form Granada Compass, then demerged into Granada Media plc and Compass Group. He remained with Granada when the two companies demerged, and became Executive Chairman of Granada plc in 2001. When Granada merged with Carlton Communications in 2004 to form ITV plc, Allen became the new company's Chief Executive.

In 2006, Allen stepped down after fifteen years with the company.

From 2006 to 2008, Allen was previously chief advisor to the British Home Office. He has also been a senior advisor to Goldman Sachs Private Equity, non-executive director of Endemol and Virgin Media and executive chairman of EMI.

In May 2021, it was announced that Allen would be the next chairman of the Balfour Beatty construction group, succeeding Philip Aiken from 20 July 2021.

Following criticism of the THG's governance arrangements, Allen replaced Matt Moulding as chairman of THG plc in March 2022.

In November 2024 Allen was named as the next chair of the British Horseracing Authority. He took over the role in September 2025 but resigned on 3 March 2026.

== Honours ==
Allen was appointed a Commander of the Order of the British Empire (CBE) in the 2003 New Year Honours "for services to the XVII Commonwealth Games". In 2005, he was awarded the Freedom of the City of Liverpool. Allen was knighted in the 2012 New Year Honours "for services to the 2012 Olympics and Paralympics".

On 1 August 2013, it was announced that Allen was to become a Labour peer in a list of new appointments to the House of Lords. Subsequently, he was created a Life Peer on 2 October 2013 taking the title Baron Allen of Kensington, of Kensington in the Royal Borough of Kensington and Chelsea.

== Personal life ==
Allen lives in Kensington with his partner of more than 20 years, Michael, an architect.

Preceded by None	Chief Executive of ITV plc 2004–06	Succeeded by Michael Grade (Executive chairman)
Orders of precedence in the United Kingdom
Preceded by The Lord Balfe	Gentlemen; Baron Allen of Kensington	Followed by The Lord Palumbo of Southwark
