= Jeff Wooller =

English accountant and educationalist (born 1940)

- Born: Herbert Jeffrey Wooller; 6 March 1940 (age 86); Yorkshire, England
- Education: London School of Economics; Cass Business School
- Occupation: Accountant

Herbert Jeffrey Wooller (born 6 March 1940) is an English accountant and educationalist. He is noted for his accountancy tuition initiatives, and for campaigning for reform of his professional institute, the Institute of Chartered Accountants in England and Wales. The institute eventually excluded him from its membership because of his association with the Irish International University, Irish University Business School and International University Business School. Wooller has founded several educational institutions such as the Jeff Wooller College, Institute of Professional Financial Managers and Irish University Business School.

== Early life and career ==
Born in Yorkshire, Wooller attended Millbridge Upper School and Heckmondwike Grammar School. He began his career as a banker, which took him to Bangladesh and Pakistan. When he returned to Yorkshire, he took a job with Peat Marwick, an accounting firm. In 1970, Wooller attended the London School of Economics to take a two-year Master of Science in accounting and finance. After the course ended in 1972, he went to Cass Business School and received a Doctor of Philosophy. At Cass Business School, Wooller together with Dr Peter Grinyer conducted extensive research into the corporate models of projects sponsored by the Institute of Chartered Accountants in England and Wales.

In January 1974, he was appointed technical editor of Accountancy, with special responsibilities in industry and commerce. He created the "Students forum" section of Accountancy and also edited the "Students ask" section. He is also a former editor of The Treasurer, the monthly journal of the Association of Corporate Treasurers and contributed to Accounting and Business Research. He has previously worked as a management accountant with Tate & Lyle plc and Imperial Chemical Industries. On 2 November 1987, Wooller was appointed editor of The Accountant.

In the 1980s, Wooller set up referral courses in the United Kingdom costing £500, which were offered on a "no pass no fee" basis provided the student had completed a 200-hour work programme and a minimum of 10 tests. In 1985, Wooller called for an appeals procedure to be implemented for students who were unsuccessful in getting an extension to the normal time limit for completing examinations.

In 2007, Wooller lost his membership as an Honorary Fellow of the Institute of Financial Accountants after appearing on television. He had made statements that discredited the professional body and accountancy.

== Institute of Chartered Accountants in England and Wales ==
Wooller was a dissident member of the Institute of Chartered Accountants in England and Wales (ICAEW). In 1991, Wooller accused the ICAEW of having built-in bias when it marked examinations during a recession, and used PE II (Professional Education II) results to show the bias. Wooller was fined by the ICAEW in 1995 for promoting unaccredited MBA courses. Wooller formed a ginger group when the ICAEW tried to merge with the Chartered Institute of Management Accountants (CIMA) in 1995. Wooller's ginger group opposed many of the actions of the ICAEW. The merger was shelved after the majority of the ICAEW members voted against it. The ginger group decided to keep fighting for democratic reforms and in June 1996, demanded that the executive of the ICAEW be elected directly by the 109,000 members of the body, instead of by the ICAEW's council of seventy members. A year later, Wooller demanded that members of the ICAEW be allowed to vote on Peter Gerrard's key constitutional reform proposals, and Wooller's motion failed by 1,400 votes, including proxies.

In April 1998, Wooller claimed that the council of the ICAEW was obstructing his campaign to increase democracy after it refused to allow the original text of motions that were to be published to be heard at the annual general meeting in June 1998. Wooller's first motion was about electing the president of the ICAEW democratically by ballot. The other two motions came about from the Gerrard report. The second motion said the district societies should be self-financing and the third motion was on reducing the number of council members to fifty-three. The first motion used a quotation from an Accountancy Age interview with council member Ian Hay Davison, and Wooller was told to stop circulating Hay Davison's quotation after he objected to being quoted. The ICAEW asked members to vote on an increase in the number of council members from seventy-five after requests made in the Gerrard report. Wooller asked members to reduce the number of council members to fifty-three, which was recommended by the Gerrard report as the ideal council quota. A 54% majority of the ICAEW members supported Wooller's motion to reduce the number.

Another merger was proposed, this time between the ICAEW, CIMA, and CIPFA. Wooller said that his ginger group was "on full alert to mobilise against any proposed merger." He also said that "we have all made huge sacrifices to become ICAEW members. We could all easily have taken CIMA or CIPFA without having to make any sacrifices", believing that differing standards of education were the greatest obstacle. Wooller also said that if the merger was to go ahead, the council of the super-institute could change the accounting examinations system and qualifications. The merger between the three institutes never took place.

The ICAEW received praise from Wooller for its efforts to promote the ACA (ICAEW Chartered Accountant) qualification in China in 2007. In a letter to Accountancy Age, Wooller went on to say that "there is also huge potential for our qualification in India and Eastern Europe." Wooller was excluded from the ICAEW in October 2009 after acting as the vice-chancellor of the Irish International University, Irish University Business School and International University Business School and not stopping it from confusing students or employers. He was not present at his disciplinary tribunal and had made no final written submissions to the tribunal.

== Organisations ==
Wooller founded the Jeff Wooller College which was based in London. It provided a wide range of courses including ACCA, CIMA, CAT and AIA courses. In 1995, Wooller denied involvement in a visa scam with the Jeff Wooller College. In the 1990s, Wooller sold the business to Felix Orogun and in 2008, it was renamed to Holborn School of Finance and Management following bad publicity about Wooller.

Wooller founded the Capital Barter Corporation International (CBCI) in May 1996; it was dissolved in February 2009. He is also the chief executive of the Institute of Professional Financial Managers and founder of the Irish University Business School. He also owned James Good Developments Limited and was involved with St. Clements University.

Wooller is a former honorary chancellor of the Irish International University. When the university was investigated by the BBC, Wooller told them that the university was not recognised anywhere and its website was "a figment of someone's imagination. Someone's dreamt up what a university should look like, and that's what's on the website." He admitted that the university's operations were dodgy. Wooller had previously raised issues with Hardeep Singh Sandhu, the owner of the university, regarding its non-existent campus and accreditation by the Quality Assurance Commission, an organisation owned by Sandhu. Wooller's response to the BBC London investigation was published by Accountancy Age.

== Personal life ==
Wooller has million-pound properties in Kensington and Monte Carlo and lives as a tax exile in Monte Carlo.

== Publications ==
- Grinyer, Peter; Wooller, Jeff (1973). Corporate Financial Modelling in the U.K., Preliminary Results of a Survey. City University Graduate Business Centre. OCLC 500430694.
- Grinyer, Peter; Wooller, Jeff (1975). Corporate Models Today: a new tool for financial management. Institute of Chartered Accountants in England and Wales. ISBN 9780852911044.
- Grinyer, Peter; Wooller, Jeff (February 1975). "Computer models for corporate planning". Long Range Planning. 8 (1): 14–25. doi:10.1016/0024-6301(75)90113-2.
- Dickinson, D; Garner, P; Lewis, J; Wooller, Jeff (1977). Financial Management Handbook. Sweet & Maxwell. ISBN 9780903393331.
- Grinyer, Peter; Wooller, Jeff (Winter 1980). "An Overview of a Decade of Corporate Modelling in the UK". Accounting and Business Research. 11 (41): 41–49. doi:10.1080/00014788.1980.9729679.
- Wooller, Jeff (1981). Wooller's Guide to PE II: The Exam-Room Approach.
