= List of universities in Niue =

This is a list of universities in Niue.

== Universities ==
- James Cook Medical University - Niue campus
- Lord Liverpool University – Niue campus
- Royal Academy of Fine Arts (Det Jyske Kunstakademi)
- St. Clements University Higher Education School
- University of the South Pacific – Niue campus

== See also ==
- List of universities by country
