= Deborah Gaël =

French entrepreneur (born 1986)

- Born: 1986 (age 39–40); Saint-Claude, Guadeloupe
- Citizenship: French
- Education: University of Southampton; Paris Nanterre University; ISGP Paris
- Occupation: Business executive
- Years active: 2018- present
- Known for: Clean Tech
- Title: Co-founder and COO at Koolboks
- Website: https://koolboks.com/

Deborah Gaël (born 1986) is a French entrepreneur and business executive. She is the co-founder and Chief Operating Officer of Koolboks, a French climate-tech company that develops solar-powered refrigeration solutions for off-grid and weak-grid communities across Africa.

Gaël was born in Saint-Claude, Guadeloupe, she was raised in Basse-Terre, the capital city of Guadeloupe. Before 2018, she held human resources and operational roles at BNP Paribas, American Express, Fluor Corporation and Société Générale. She was recognized for her work as a finalist in the 2021 VivaTech Female Founder Challenge and as a 2025 nominee for the Pritzker Emerging Environmental Genius Award.

== Biography ==
Gaël was born in 1986 in Saint-Claude, Guadeloupe, France, and was educated in Guadeloupe. After completing high school, she pursued further studies in Barbados, Trinidad, and England. Gaël studied Applied Foreign Languages at Paris Nanterre University, graduating in 2011. She also holds a Postgraduate Certificate in Education (PGCE) from the University of Southampton and completed a Master's degree in Human Resources and Labour Relations at ISGP Paris in 2012. In 2025, she enrolled in the Global Executive MBA (GEMBA) program at INSEAD.

== Career ==
=== Early career ===
In 2008 Gaël began as a teacher at the British Council until 2010. She subsequently held a series of human resources roles in Paris, including HR Project Management Junior at CANSPEAK, HR Assistant at Société Générale in 2012, International Mobility Officer at Fluor Corporation, HR Officer at American Express from 2013 to 2016, and HR Business Partner at Symag by Wynd between 2016 and 2019.

=== Koolboks ===
In 2018, Gaël co-founded Koolboks with Ayoola Dominic, a French-based company that manufactures solar-powered freezers and ice makers designed for Off-the-grid and weak-grid areas in Africa. It combining its cooling technology with pay-as-you-go financing and IoT-enabled monitoring systems. As COO, Gaël has overseen the company's operations and expansion as Koolboks grew across African markets.

Koolboks launched initiatives including Koolbuy and Scrap4New. In 2023, Koolboks signed a partnership with Fan Milk Danone Nigeria to pilot freezers in Lagos under a Cooling-as-a-Service model, and partnered with Orange Energies to expand solar refrigeration access across 12 African countries. In the same year, Koolboks listed on the Cleantech 50 to Watch at Cleantech Forum Europe in Tallinn, Estonia.

In 2024, The company was named "Ultimate Challenger" at the Food Tech Challengers awards. In the same year, Koolboks was named finalist for the Zayed Sustainability Prize. In 2025, the company announced the launch of PowerFoot Pedestal, a solar system that turns any freezer into a fully off-grid appliance and also unveiled Nollywood actress Mercy Johnson as a brand ambassador. Koolboks won the Start-Up Energy Transition Award in the same year. In 2026, co-founder Gaël featured at the Austrian World Summit in Vienna, where she delivered a keynote on sustainable cooling in Africa.

== Recognition ==
- 2021: Gaël named finalist in VivaTech Female Founder Challenge (Paris).
- 2025: Gaël nominated for the Pritzker Emerging Environmental Genius Award.
- 2025: Named by Bloomberg among the 25 African Startups to Watch in 2025.
- 2026: Koolboks recognized by Fast Company among the Most Innovative Companies in Europe, the Middle East and Africa.
