= Olukemi Fadehan =

Nigerian librarian (born 1962)

Olukemi Adebimpe Fadehan
- Born: November 1962 (age 63); Ibadan
- Citizenship: Nigerian
- Education: The Polytechnic Ibadan; University of Ibadan
- Occupation: Librarian
- Years active: 1987–present
- Organizations: Ogun State University; University of Lagos; Obafemi Awolowo University

Olukemi Adebimpe Fadehan is a Nigerian librarian and the current university librarian for Obafemi Awolowo University.

== Early life and education ==
Olukemi hailed from Ibadan and she was given birth to in November 1962. In 1978, she obtained her O'Level certificate from Methodist High School Ilesa. She obtained her GCE from the Polytechnic Ibadan in 1980. She proceeded to University of Ibadan where she obtained her first degree in education in 1983. She obtained her MSc in library studies from the same institution in 1986. She bagged her doctorate in 2006 from University of Ibadan.

== Career ==
Olukemi started her career as an announcer at the Ogun State Broadcasting Corporation in 1986 during her National Youth Service Corp. Between 1987 and 1992, she worked as a librarian at Ogun State University, Ago Iwoye. Between 2013 and 2019, she served as the university librarian for University of Lagos and she is currently the university librarian for Obafemi Awolowo University.
