= Ayoola Dominic =

Nigerian pharmacist (born 1980)

- Born: Lagos, Nigeria
- Citizenship: French
- Education: Obafemi Awolowo University; EDHEC Business School
- Occupation: CEO at Koolboks
- Years active: 2018- present
- Title: co-founder at Koolboks
- Website: https://koolboks.com/

Ayoola Dominic is a Nigerian pharmacist and entrepreneur. He is the President and co-founder of Koolboks, a French-based clean-technology company that offers solar-powered refrigeration solutions for underserved and off-grid communities across Africa, founded in 2018. Trained as a pharmacist, Dominic earned a Bachelor of Pharmacy degree from Obafemi Awolowo University in 2005 and later obtained a Masters in Entrepreneurship from EDHEC Business School in 2011. Prior to Koolboks, Dominic held roles at multinational companies including AstraZeneca, L'Oréal, Robert Walters, and Servier.

== Education ==
Dominic obtained a Bachelor of Pharmacy degree from Obafemi Awolowo University in Nigeria in 2005. He later earned a Master of Science (MSc) in Entrepreneurship and Business Development from EDHEC Business School in France in 2011.

== Career ==
Dominic worked at AstraZeneca in Nigeria in 2007 as a Medical Representative. He later became Territory Sales Manager, where he led product relaunch initiatives and commercial growth strategies until 2010.

In 2011, he joined L'Oréal in France as a Marketing Intelligence Officer, focusing on Sub-Saharan Africa. From 2012 to 2014, he worked at Robert Walters as a Talent Management Consultant on African markets.

In 2014, Dominic joined Servier as Deputy Regional Operations Manager for the Middle East and Africa Division. He was later appointed Director of Operations (MEA Division) in 2017.

== Business career ==
In 2018, Dominic co-founded Koolboks with Deborah Gaël. The company initially explored solar-powered cooling solutions for recreational markets later pivoted its focus on off-grid refrigeration systems for underserved communities in Africa. Koolboks is a French-based company that provide the solar-powered refrigerators and freezers on the African markets.

Under Dominic's leadership, it started in Nigeria and expanded operations across African markets, adopting a pay-as-you-go (PAYG) financing model. In 2024, Koolboks launched Koolbuy, a payment platform that allows customers to lease or purchase cooling appliances through installments. It also launched Scrap4New, a circular economy initiative that enables customers to exchange high-emission appliances for environmentally friendly solar-ready alternatives.

In 2022, Koolboks secured a $2.5 million seed round to scale its operations in Nigeria and Kenya. In 2023, the company partnered with Orange Energie, a division of Orange, to deploy solar-powered freezers in the Democratic Republic of the Congo. In 2025, Koolboks raised $11 million to accelerate expansion across Africa and Dominic appeared on the list of Top 10 Most-Funded African Startup Founders in 2025 by Business Elites Africa magazine.

== Recognition ==
- 2022: Among 50 finalists for Africa's Business Heroes challenge by Alibaba Philanthropy.
- 2023: Koolboks listed on Cleantech 50 to Watch at Cleantech Forum Europe.
- 2024: Dominic featured on the Meaningful Business MB100 list.
