= Simeon Bamire =

Nigerian academic (born 1959)

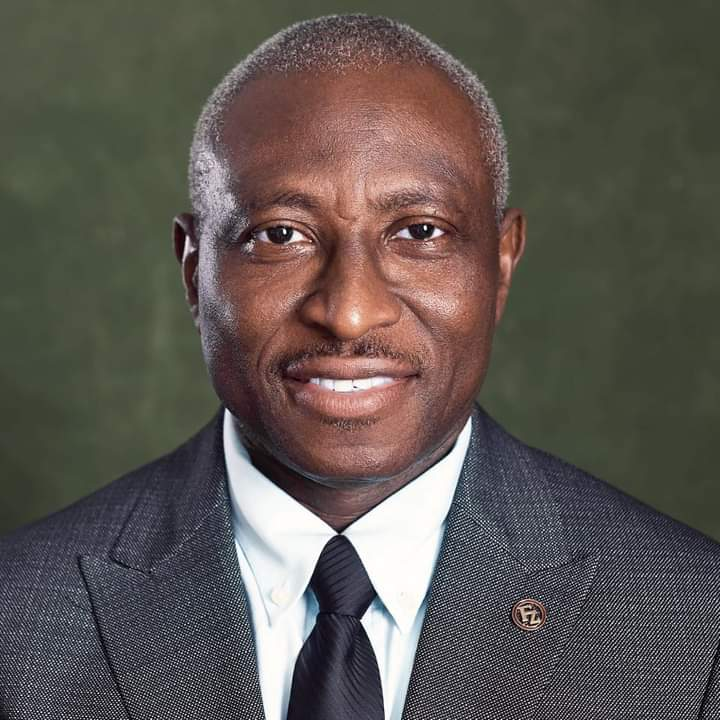
- Prof Bamire - Current VC, OAU

12th Vice-chancellor of Obafemi Awolowo University
- Incumbent
- Assumed office 7 June 2022
- Preceded by: Eyitope Ogunbodede

Personal details
- Born: Adebayo Simeon Bamire; 18 January 1959 (age 67) Oyan, Western Region, British Nigeria (now in Osun State, Nigeria)

Adebayo Simeon Bamire (born 18 January 1959) is a Nigerian academic and professor of agricultural economics who is the 12th substantial Vice Chancellor of Obafemi Awolowo University, Ile-Ife, since 2022. He previously served as deputy vice chancellor academics.

== Early life and education ==
Bamire is from Oyan in Odo-Otin Local Government Area, Osun State, Nigeria. He started his education in Datus Preparatory School, Accra, Ghana and moved to St. Charles’ Grammar School, Osogbo for his secondary school between 1972 - 1976. He was admitted into the then University of Ife (now Obafemi Awolowo University, Ile-Ife) to study agricultural economics in the Faculty of Agriculture where he completed his first, second and third degrees; Bachelor of Agriculture in 1985, M.Phil., in 1992, and PhD in 1999 respectively.

== Academic career ==
Bamire started his academic career in the Department of Agricultural Economics as Assistant lecturer in 1992 and became a Professor in 2008. He was a visiting Scientist at the International Institute of Tropical Agriculture (IITA), Ibadan; the Vice-Dean, Faculty of Agriculture, Obafemi Awolowo University in the 2007/2008 & 2008/2009 academic sessions; the head of the Department of Agricultural Economics for the 2010/2011 academic session and the immediate past dean of the Faculty of Agriculture, Obafemi Awolowo University, Ile-Ife. He also served as the dean between 1 August 2013 and 31 July 2015.

Bamire is a member of the Nigerian Association of Agricultural Economists (NAAE) and Leadership for Environment & Development (LEAD). He is also a member of the Drought Tolerant Maize for Africa Project and Agribenchmark based in Germany.

== Personal life ==
Bamire is married to Felicia Bosede Bamire and they have four children.
