= Anthony Elujoba =

Nigerian academics (born 1948)

Acting Vice-chancellor of Obafemi Awolowo University
- In office July 2016 – June 2017
- Preceded by: Idowu Bantale Omole
- Succeeded by: Eyitope Ogunbodede

Personal details
- Born: 1948 (age 77–78) Ile-Ife, Osun State, Nigeria

Anthony Elujoba (born 1948) is a Nigerian professor of Pharmacognosy, fondly referred to as the "village chemist" because of his involvement in research into medicinal plants. He was acting vice chancellor of Obafemi Awolowo University, Nigeria. He attended the legendary boys-only St John's Grammar School, Òkè Atan, Ilódè, Ilé-Ifè.

== See also ==
- List of vice chancellors in Nigeria
- Obafemi Awolowo University
