= Karimot Odebode =

Nigerian social entrepreneur

- Born: Ibadan, Nigeria
- Education: Obafemi Awolowo University
- Occupation: Education advocate

Karimot Olábísí Odébòdé is a Nigerian education advocate, lawyer, poet, and founder of Black Girl's Dream Initiative, a youth-led organization aimed at closing the gender gap.

In 2022, she was the only Nigerian on the lists of the 2022 United Nations cohort of 17 Young Leaders for Sustainable Development Goals (SDGs), announced at the 77th session of the UN General Assembly.

She is a Youth Champion for ONE Campaign in Nigeria to helping in spearheading the fight against poverty and in 2022, the Ministry of Youth and Sports Oyo State recognized her as one of the 100 influential young people for her advocacy work.

She authored a 156-page collection of over 100 poems published by Noirledge Publishing in 2022 which gives a voice to women.
