= Oluremi Odunsi =

Nigerian entrepreneur

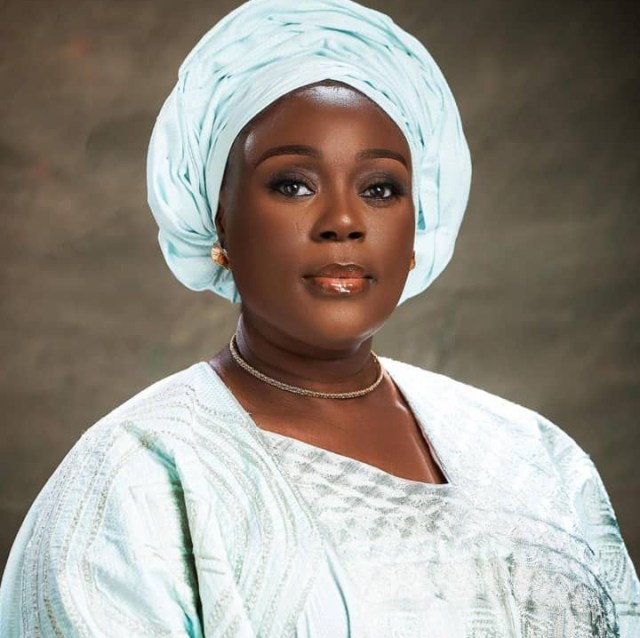
- Odunsi in March 2025
- Born: Nigeria
- Education: Obafemi Awolowo University (BSc); EDHEC Business School
- Occupation: Entrepreneur
- Known for: Founder of Eridan Group
- Awards: Nigerian Books of Records (2021), Yessiey Awards (2023)

Oluremi Oluwalogbon Odunsi (born 13 October 1968) is a Nigerian entrepreneur, philanthropist, and female empowerment advocate. She is the founder and CEO of Eridan Group.

== Early life and education ==
Oluremi Oluwalogbon Odunsi was born 13 October 1963. She attended Obafemi Awolowo University, where she earned a B.sc degree in management and accounting. She also obtained a Master of Business Administration (MBA) in Information and Communication Technology from EDHEC Business School in France.

== Career ==
Odunsi began her career in banking, insurance, automobile, real estate and FMCG industries before founding Eridan Group. She is an advocate of gender equality and socio-economic development in Nigeria known for combating gender-based violence and promoting women's entrepreneurship. Her work has influenced policies supporting women's empowerment.

Oluremi has reportedly influenced an increase in youth and women participation in agriculture by pioneering an implementation of high-efficiency, climate-smart agriculture such as precision farming, drip irrigation, and agroforestry to increase yields while reducing water usage and emissions in Nigeria.

According to Blueprint, she helped over 10,000 children and 1,500 women living in poverty build sustainable small businesses and improve their livelihoods through her transformative entrepreneurship program.

In 2025, she was named one of the five Influential African Women in International Development by Independent. She was listed by New Telegraph amongst four African women advocating for education and empowerment for girls.

== Recognition ==
Oluremi is a fellow of Institute of Consulting, EDHEC Business School, Chartered Institute of Accounting, ACCA and fellowship membership in FCCA (UK). In 2021 she was inducted into Nigerian Books of Records as an awardee and in 2023, she was awarded Philanthropy of the Year by Yessiey Awards for her contributions.
