= Isles International University =

Organisation

The Isles International University/Université (IIU), formerly known as Irish International University and European Business School, is an unaccredited university operating currently in Ireland.

In April 2018, The Irish Times described the organisation as a "bogus university" that "targets overseas students with the promise of earning an Irish university qualification online that holds 'international recognition'". It was described as "An international education scam" by the BBC in an investigation in 2008.

Founded in 1996, the IIU has no campus of its own in Ireland but works with unspecified partner institutions abroad. When talking about the IIU to a BBC reporter, its "honorary chancellor," Jeff Wooller, said in 2007 after he was terminated that: "The whole thing's dodgy." According to its website the IIU is still in operation although, in response to the report shown on the BBC, it has removed some material in 2008.

The IIU is run by an "executive president," who has been described by Malaysian news media as "a Malaysian businessman" and by Verifile and Accredibase as a "Malaysian professor". IIU, according to Wooller is not set up by him.

== History ==
The Oregon Office of Degree Authorization says of the Irish International University that it is located in Malaysia and Switzerland and that:

The Irish government has requested that Malaysia close this entity on grounds that it is neither Irish nor a university. It has obtained a business license in a Swiss canton, but is not a Swiss university.

Irish International University (or Irish International University of Europa) was renamed Isles International University. In 2011, iiuedu.ie, the top page of the Irish International University (with an Irish top-level domain) said at its foot "Isles Internationale Universite [sic]" and had a link labeled "Enter Website" that pointed to the website of Isles International University (iiuedu.ac, with an Ascension Island top-level domain), which said at its foot "Isles Internationale Universite [sic] (European Union) Limited"; in early 2012, it no longer redirected elsewhere.

The Office of Degree Authorization of Oregon says of the Isles International University that it is located in St Kitts and Malaysia.

== In the news ==
It was reported in the press on 7 January 2008 that businesswoman Mary Chapman, chief executive of the Chartered Management Institute (CMI), had been hoodwinked into attending and handing out certificates at a degree ceremony. Chapman agreed to be guest of honour at the ceremony held at the Divinity School at the University of Oxford. Pictures of her in attendance, which were posted on the university's website, have now been removed. The ceremony was also attended by an undercover reporter and actor from the BBC. The CMI "severed all links" to the IIU and that the University of Oxford banned the IIU from using its premises again. A Malaysian, described by the Sunday Star as a "prominent public figure" and "leading academic", who had received an honorary degree from Irish International University in 2001 was surprised to be told (in 2009) that the university was considered to be a scam. He told a newspaper reporter that he had attended a graduation ceremony at the University of London and that the school seemed "very credible".

A BBC London News investigation by reporter Angela Saini discovered that at its advertised Dublin campus address there was only a mailbox. The investigation also found that the IIU was accredited by "Quality Assurance Commission UK Limited", owned by the IIU's executive president and nothing more than a mailbox and a small website.

In 2009, it was listed as a diploma mill by the American Association of Collegiate Registrars and Admissions Officers.

== Isles Internationale Universite in Ireland ==
Isles Internationale Universite in Malaysia (IIUM), also called Isles International University in Malaysia, describes itself as "a non profit making international organisation dedicated to cross-cultural experience with a global perspective in leadership & enterpreneurialship" [sic]. The IIUM website mentions the Accreditation Syndicate for Education and Training (ASET), whose sole address in Malaysia is identical to that of IIUM.

== European Business School Cambridge ==
The European Business School Cambridge, or European Business School (Cambridge), is an offshoot of IIU.

== See also ==
- Accreditation mill
- Diploma mills
- List of unaccredited institutions of higher education
- Unaccredited institutions of higher education
