= Bamitale Omole =

Nigerian academic (born 1954)

10th Vice-chancellor of Obafemi Awolowo University
- In office June 2011 – July 2016
- Preceded by: Micheal Oladimeji Faborede
- Succeeded by: Anthony Elujoba

Personal details
- Born: Idowu Bamitale Omole; September 1954 (age 71) Oye-Ekiti, Southern Region, British Nigeria (now in Ekiti State, Nigeria)
- Party: Non-Partisan

Idowu Bamitale "Tale" Omole (born September 1954) is a Nigerian professor of international relations, educational administrator, and former Vice Chancellor of Obafemi Awolowo University, Ile-Ife, Nigeria.

== Early life and education ==
He was born in September 1954 in Oye-Ekiti, Ekiti State, Nigeria. Oye-Ekiti is a town in Ekiti state, southwestern Nigeria. He attended Methodist High School, Ilesa (1966–71) for his secondary education and later attended Government College, Ibadan, between 1971 and 1973 for his Advanced Levels, winning multiple prizes at both colleges. In September 1973, he proceeded to the University of Ife now Obafemi Awolowo University, Osun State, Nigeria, where he obtained a Bachelor of Arts (B.A) degree in history in 1976. In 1981, he obtained an MA degree in history from the University of Ife. He later proceeded to the University of Bordeaux, France for a M.Phil. and a Doctorate (Ph.D.) degree in international relations. Omole speaks and writes in French fluently. In 1991, he obtained a diploma in International Law and organisation for development from the Institute of Social Studies, The Hague, Netherlands.

== Career ==
He began his career as an assistant lecturer in 1986 at Obafemi Awolowo University after he obtained a Doctorate degree in International Relations and rose through the ranks to be appointed a professor of international relations. He was appointed as the 10th vice chancellor of Obafemi Awolowo University in June 2011. As part of his numerous academic, administrative and public policy assignments, Omole has extensively lectured in Africa, Europe, the Americas and Asia. He has also served as a technical consultant to various international organisations. Prior to becoming Vice-Chancellor, he was at various times Head of Department of International Relations, Vice Dean of the faculty of administration and Dean of the Faculty of Administration. He served for two terms on the university's Governing Council. His areas of teaching and research interest are – International economic relations, International relations of the Francophone states, African government and politics, Regional integration and International development. He was a visiting scholar at the Korea Foundation and the University of Bordeaux. He was the National Independent Electoral Commission (INEC) returning officer of the August 2014 Osun State, governorship election that led to the re-election of Ogbeni Rauf Aregbesola as the governor elect of Osun State, Nigeria.

== Vice-Chancellor of Obafemi Awolowo University ==
Omole was named the 10th substantive Vice Chancellor of OAU in 2011. During his presidency, OAU was for four consecutive years (2011–2014) ranked number one by Webometrics. The university also invested heavily in student wellness and services. The university embarked on an aggressive fundraising drive which was deemed successful. During his tenure his administration embarked on 30 major capital projects. Among the projects were: construction of an Olympic size swimming pool, moot court, university hall, a 12-storey Senate building (Jubilee House), and rehabilitation of others. He led the university to win an $8m grant from the World Bank, to establish an African Center of Excellence, with specific focus on the OAU Knowledge Park. His extensive contributions were recognized by the Chancellor His Royal Highness Alhaji Yahaya Abubakar. According to him, “Omole will be remembered for a number of achievements but most especially for ensuring that the students are taught and given skills that are required for them to compete in the job market; He added that the feat recorded by the immediate past Vice Chancellor of OAU is notable in terms of physical, infrastructure upliftment and development of the university popularly known as the most beautiful campus in Africa. His milestone according to him was recognized for initiating the reengineering and repositioning of Great Ife as a twenty first century, World Class African University".

== Honours and recognition ==
Professor Omole has received several fellowship awards, such as the United States Information Agency/Ford Foundation (USIA/Ford Foundation) Award, the International Visitors Leadership Program of the US Dept of State, International d'Etudes Scientific (CIES) award, and fellowship of the Malawi Centre for Advice, Research and Education Rights and the government of the Netherlands.

== Other activities ==
Prof Omole is currently the pro-chancellor and chairman of Council of Ekiti State University. Bamitale Omole delivered the 2019 Caleb University Founders Day Lecture, where he spoke on "Quality education, tool for nation building". Prof Omole also serves as a member of the board of trustees of McPherson University. He also serves on the boards of various corporate and non governmental organisations.

== Selected works ==
Omole, I. B. (1986). De la coopération à la confédération: la Sénégambie: contribution à l'analyse du thème de l'intégration politique régionale en Afrique (Doctoral dissertation, Atelier national de reproduction des thèses).

Omotoso, F., & Oladeji, O. (2019). Legislative Oversight in the Nigerian Fourth Republic. In The Nigerian National Assembly (pp. 57–72). Springer, Cham.

== See also ==
- Obafemi Awolowo University
