= Eko DisCo =

One of Nigeria's eleven electricity distribution companies

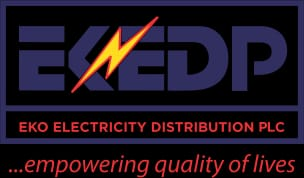
- Type: Public Limited Company
- Industry: Electricity Distribution, Company
- Founded: 2013
- Headquarters: Lagos, Nigeria
- Website: https://ekedp.com

Eko DisCo, also known as EKEDC or the Eko Electricity Distribution Company, is one of Nigeria's eleven electricity distribution companies, serving parts of Lagos and Ogun States.

== History ==
EKEDC was founded after the unbundling of the Power Holding Company of Nigeria under the Electric Power Sector Reform Act and was privatized in November 2013 alongside other DisCos. Initially owned by West Power & Gas (WPG), in January 2025 Transgrid Enerco, a consortium of North‑South Power, Axxela, and Stanbic Infrastructure Growth Fund, signed an agreement to acquire a 60% stake in EKEDC.

In mid-2024, the Federal Competition and Consumer Protection Commission warned EKEDC (along with Ikeja DisCo) to pause the replacement of Unistar prepaid meters amid compliance concerns. In July 2021, a consumer group sued EKEDC and Ikeja over estimated billing practices.

In March 2025, it reported that Nigerian Army personnel assaulted staff and damaged equipment at its Badagry substation during a power upgrade.

== Board disputes ==
In April 2024, EKEDC's parent company WPG dismissed its first female managing director, Dr. Tinuade Sanda, following internal board disputes initiated after a NERC directive to end secondment arrangements. Rekhiat Momoh was subsequently appointed Acting CEO. In early 2024, the Nigerian House of Representatives investigated alleged boardroom conflicts, citing the federal government's 40% stake as a reason for oversight.

== Achievements ==
- In April 2025, Eko Disco recorded ₦38.7 billion in monthly revenue collections, a 28.8% year-on-year increase, achieving 100% collection efficiency for the month.
- Eko Disco was named Distribution Company of the Year (2023) at the inaugural Energy Times Awards, held at Eko Hotels and Suites, Victoria Island, Lagos, on 19 April 2024.
- Eko Disco has participated in the federal government's National Mass Metering Programme (NMMP) and the Meter Acquisition Fund (MAF) initiative; by November 2025 the company reported completing meter installations under Tranche A and metering over 450,000 customers network-wide.
- Under NERC's Service-Based Tariff (SBT) framework, introduced in 2020, Eko Disco has classified eligible high-yield residential and industrial clusters as Band A customers, targeted at a minimum of 20 hours of daily electricity supply.
- In October 2025, Eko Electricity Distribution Plc registered Excel Electricity Distribution Company Limited as a wholly owned subsidiary to hold its Lagos State distribution license, in compliance with the Electricity Act 2023 and directives from the Lagos State Electricity Regulatory Commission (LASERC). LASERC subsequently issued Excel its own distribution license; Eko Electricity Distribution Plc transitioned into a holding company, with Excel Disco assuming the operating license for Lagos State distribution activities, while EKEDP continues to operate directly in the Agbara area of Ogun State.

== Directors and Management ==
As of March 2026, the board and executive management comprise:

- Engr. (Dr.) Olubunmi Peters – Chairman
- Prof. George Nwangwu – Director
- Farouk Aliyu – Director
- Rasheed Olaoluwa – Director
- Kolapo Joseph – Director
- Ayodeji Gbeleyi – Director (Bureau of Public Enterprises representative)
- Sherifat Adegbenro – Acting Chief Executive Officer (approved pending appointment of a substantive CEO; previously Deputy CEO)

== Inception ==
In March 2005, the Electric Power Sector Reform Act (EPSRA) came into force, leading to the eventual dissolution of the National Electric Power Authority (NEPA) and the creation of the Power Holding Company of Nigeria (PHCN) as an interim successor. Eko Disco was among the distribution companies formed from PHCN's unbundling and was privatized in November 2013 alongside the other DisCos, giving investors majority or total ownership.

Eko Electricity Distribution Plc has supplied power to the southern part of Lagos State and the Agbara community in Ogun State. The licensed area was historically segmented into 12 districts: Lekki, Ibeju, Islands, Ajah, Ajele, Orile, Ijora, Apapa, Mushin, Festac, Ojo, and Agbara, though following the October 2025 restructuring, Lagos-based districts now fall under Excel Electricity Distribution Limited's license.

In October 2020, Eko Disco became the first electricity distribution company in Nigeria to launch the Supervisory Control and Data Acquisition – Distribution Management System (SCADA-DMS).
