= Roseline Adewuyi =

Nigerian gender advocate

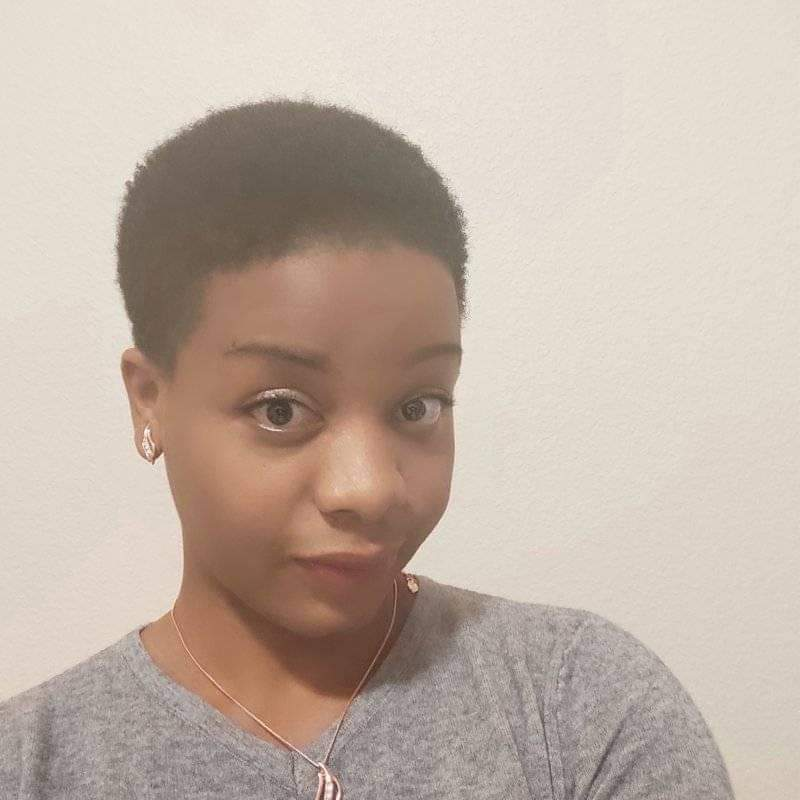
- Born: Jos, Plateau
- Education: Bachelor of Arts (BA), Obafemi Awolowo University; MA, University of Ibadan
- Occupations: Social educator, Gender advocate and Blogger
- Years active: 2014–present
- Notable work: The Founder of the Roseline Initiative

Roseline Adebimpe Adewuyi is a Nigerian social educator and feminist. In 2020, she was among the sixty women profiled by BusinessDay Women’s Hub in celebration of Nigeria’s 60th independence and a 2018 fellow of Dalai Lama Fellowship due to her work on the development of the girl child.

== Early life and education ==
Adewuyi was born in Jos, Plateau State, to a father from Ogbomosho, Oyo State, who is a professor of French literature, and a mother who holds a PhD.

She graduated with a first class in French earning a Bachelor of Arts degree from Obafemi Awolowo University graduating as the best female student in the Faculty of Arts and Masters in Art with Distinction from the University of Ibadan finishing as the best graduating student in the Department of European Studies. She also holds a PhD in French Literature, with a graduate concentration in Women and Gender Studies from Purdue University, USA. During her PhD at Purdue University, she received the Student of the Year Award from the Office of the Provost in 2022.

== Career and activism ==
Adewuyi's mission is to help girls to become self-reliant and break free from gender stereotypes. She is the Founder of the Roseline Initiative and a 2025 honoree on the Most Influential People of African Descent (MIPAD) list in the Social Impact category.

In 2018, Adewuyi started writing on her website, highlighting issues around African girls and organizes regular school outreaches for girls in secondary schools, teaching them the skills they need as potential leaders. National Youth Service Corps served as the bedrock of her activism as she received an Award as a distinguished corps member in Kwara State due to her community development contributions during her service year.

She has since been selected for fellowships and programmes in countries such as France, Rwanda, Ethiopia, Algeria, Ghana, and the United States. Between 2019 and 2020, she was in the employ of the African Union, working as a French Translator and received recognitions including being a member of the Commonwealth Youth Gender Equality Network, ONE Champion, MCW fellow, the Dalai Lama Fellow, Award for Under 25 years of age Outstanding Social Innovator in Education by Ideation Hub Africa and represented Nigeria in France for the Lab Citoyen Human Rights program sponsored by the French Embassy in Nigeria. To mark Nigeria's 60th Independence Day celebration, she was listed as one of “The 60 Women Doing Phenomenal Things” by the Business Day Women’s Hub.

In 2023, Adewuyi represented Nigeria at the United Nations Graduate Study Programme in Geneva, Switzerland due to her work as a French translator and in the NGO sector. She was one of the top 50 finalists from 176 countries for the Chegg Global Student Prize.

In 2024, she was featured by the United Nations for her work at the intersection of education and gender equality in a publication titled Breaking Gender Barriers through Education.

She leads the Ending Gender Stereotypes in Schools (ENGENDERS) initiative, working closely with students, parents, and educators to dismantle gender bias in educational environments. With a strong emphasis on early intervention and sustainable mindset transformation, the initiative has earned international recognition, including her selection as a finalist for the We Are Together Prize in 2022.

== Publications ==
She has more than 10 publications

=== Selected publications ===
- LA CONCEPTION DU MARIAGE AFRICAIN : UNE LECTURE DE RIWAN OU LE CHEMIN DE SABLE PAR KEN BUGUL., March 2022. Roseline Adewuyi
- LANGUAGE, COMMUNICATION AND EDUCATION FOR AFRICA'S TRANSFORMATION. Joseph Akanbi ADEWUYI, Lydia Aduke Adewuyi, Roseline Adewuyi. March 2022
- LANGUAGE, LITERATURE, CULTURE, MIGRATION AND NATIONAL COHESION: EPIPHANY IN AMINATA SOWFALL'S DOUCEUR DE BERCAIL : A MECHANISM FOR THE TRANSFORMATION OF THE INDIVIDUAL AND THE COMMUNITY. Ahmed Titilade, Roseline Adewuyi,. Jan 2021
- PROBLEMS OF LEARNING FOREIGN LANGUAGES IN COLLEGES OF EDUCATION AND UNIVERSITIES IN NIGERIA: A COMPARATIVE STUDY OF ENGLISH AND FRENCH LANGUAGES. Joseph Akanbi, Anthony Oladayo Bernard, Roseline Adewuyi,. Sep 2015
