= Philip Aiken =

Australian business executive (born 1949)

Philip S. Aiken
- Born: 9 January 1949 (age 77); Sydney
- Education: University of Sydney (BS)
- Occupations: Chairman of Balfour Beatty (2015 to 2021) and Aveva (2012 to 2023)
- Board member of: Newmont; New Energy One Acquisitions; BIAC
- Spouse: Fran
- Children: 3 sons

Philip S. Aiken (born 9 January 1949) is an Australian business executive.

Aiken holds a Bachelor of Engineering degree in chemical engineering from University of Sydney, and has attended the Advanced Management Program from Harvard Business School. Aiken was formerly Group President of BHP Billiton's energy business, and an executive director of Nylex. He held senior positions at BOC, and was also a senior advisor to Macquarie Capital (Europe).

== Early life and education ==
Aiken was born in Sydney, Australia, on 9 January 1949. In 1970, he graduated with a Bachelor of Engineering degree in chemical engineering from University of Sydney and later in 1989, attended the Advanced Management Program at Harvard Business School.

== Career ==
Aiken started his career in 1970 with BOC; where he served for nearly 26 years, holding several senior positions. In 1995, he was appointed executive director and Chief Executive of Nylex (which later became Invensys). From 1997 until his retirement in 2006, he worked for BHP Billiton; firstly as President of BHP Petroleum, and latterly as Group President of BHP Billiton's Energy business. From 2006 until 2009, he was a senior advisor at Macquarie Bank.

He was appointed to the board of Robert Walters in July 2000, and as its chairman in May 2007. On 24 May 2012, Aiken decided to step down from his role as chairman of Robert Walters once the process of appointing a successor chairman has been completed.

In April 2012, Aiken was appointed to the board of Aveva, to succeed the outgoing chairman Nick Prest. He commenced his duties as chairman after the shareholders approval at the Annual General Meeting on 12 July 2012 and stood down in January 2023. In April 2013 he joined the board of Newcrest standing down following its acquisition by Newmont whose Board he joined in November 2023. In March 2015, he became chairman of Balfour Beatty and stood down as chairman on 20 July 2021.

He joined the Board of New Energy One Acquisitions in 2021 and BIAC in 2023.

He was also formerly a non-executive director of National Grid plc, copper mining company Kazakhmys, Indian-focused energy company Essar Energy. and Miclyn Express Offshore, a Singapore based service boat company.

== Personal life ==
Aiken lives in Melbourne and London with his wife, Fran. He was awarded a Member of the Order of Australia in June 2013.

Business positions
Preceded by Nick Prest	Chairman of Aveva; 2012–	Succeeded by Incumbent
Preceded by Steve Marshall	Chairman of Balfour Beatty; 2015–	Succeeded by Incumbent
Preceded by	Chairman of Robert Walters; 2007–2012	Succeeded by Leslie Van de Walle
