= Kunle Adewale =

Nigerian social entrepreneur (born 1981)

Olakunle Adewale
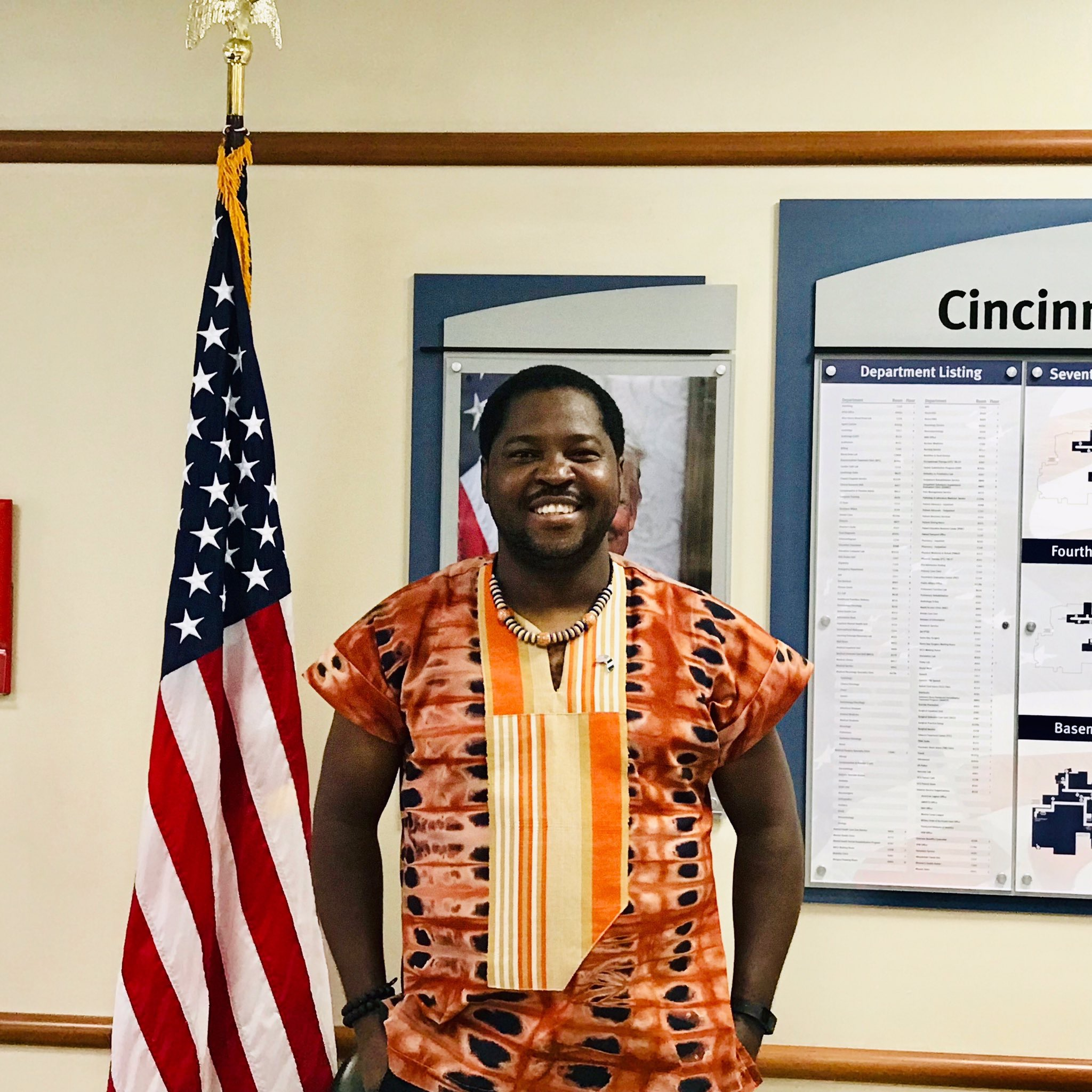
- Born: Olakunle Joel Adewale; 13 May 1981 (age 44); Mushin, Lagos, Nigeria
- Education: Obafemi Awolowo University; Tulane University; University of Florida
- Occupation: Social entrepreneur/artist
- Known for: Promoting Arts in medicine
- Spouse: Mopelola Adewale
- Website: Tenderartsng.org

Olakunle Joel Adewale (born 13 May 1981) is a Nigerian social entrepreneur and visual artist who in 2013 founded Tender Arts Nigeria, an organization with focus on therapeutic arts, arts in health, talent development, community empowerment and civic engagement through visual, literary and performing arts which benefit children, youth, adult and the aged across the world. Also, on 10 October 2021, he launched the first ever Mental health fellowship where he helps amplify the voices of young people interested in mental health and that with also provides a form of mental healing to the fellows.

In 2015, he met President Barack Obama in the United States through the Mandela Washington Fellowship for leadership influence in using arts to improve the lives of people in the communities and, in 2019, he received an international recognition with 2 August being declared as "Kunle Adewale Day" by the Mayor of Cincinnati, John Cranley, in acknowledgement of Adewale's contribution to the US in the fields of both Arts and Medicine.

== Early life and education ==
Adewale was born on 13 May 1981 as the ninth child in the family of fourteen children in Mushin, a suburb of Lagos State where he went on to complete his primary and secondary school education at Mushin Mainland Model Primary School before proceeding to St. Joseph Boy's Secondary School, Surulere, Lagos. Thereafter, he proceeded to Auchi Polytechnic to study Painting and General Arts and later obtained a Bachelor of Art degree in Fine and Applied Arts from Obafemi Awolowo University, Ile-Ife. He went on to study Civic Leadership from Tulane University, New Orleans, in 2015 and Arts in Medicine summer intensive from the University of Florida.

== Art career ==
Adewale started art during his teenage years working on comics, Bible characters, creative writings and later metamorphosed to doing it professionally.

In 2019, he was honoured for his contributions to arts in medicine field by the Mayor of Cincinnati, Mayor John Cranley as 2 August 2019 was proclaimed as "Kunle Adewale Day2 in Cincinnati, Ohio, United States, and became the first International Artist in Residence of the Eyes of the Artists Foundation.

== Books ==
Adewale has published two books:

- Seed For Seasons
- Why Sit We Here Till We Die? A tale of 4 lepers

== Awards and recognitions ==
- 2015: YNaija top 10 most influential Nigerians under 40 (Advocacy)
- 2016: Commonwealth Youth Award for West Africa region
- 2018: JCI Ten Outstanding Young Persons of Nigeria awardee
- 2019: Atlantic Fellow of Global Brain Health Institute, University of California
