= Dele Ogunseitan =

Nigerian public health researcher

Oladele Abiola Ogunseitan
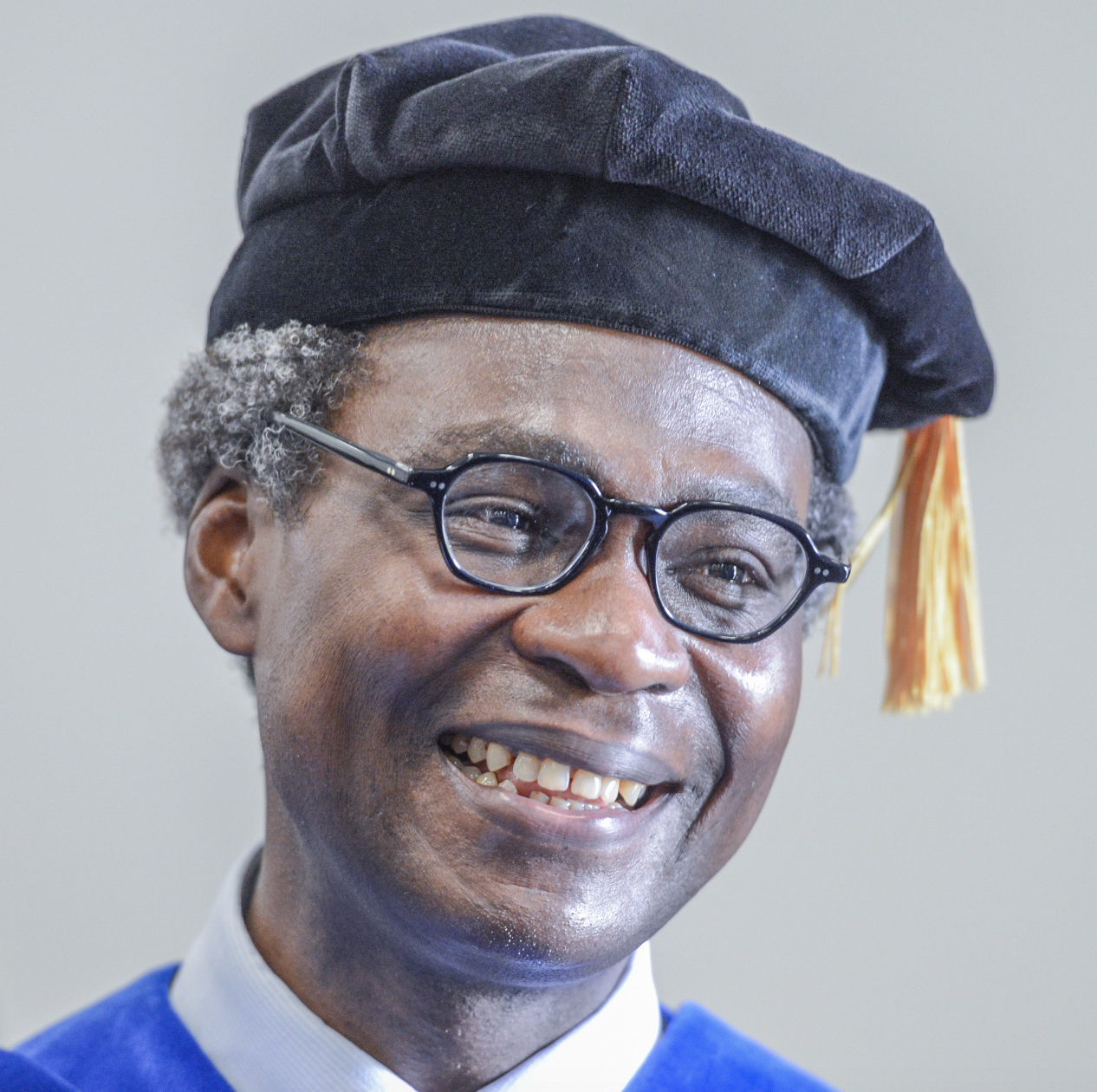
- Ogunseitan at UC Irvine's commencement ceremony in 2019
- Born: Nigeria
- Education: University of Ife; University of Tennessee, Knoxville; University of California, Berkeley
- Scientific career
- Workplaces: University of California, Irvine
- Thesis: Molecular ecology of Pseudomonas aeruginosa bacteriophages in a freshwater environment (1988)

Oladele "Dele" Abiola Ogunseitan is a Nigerian public health researcher who is the University of California Presidential Chair at the University of California, Irvine. His research considers how toxic pollutants impact human and environmental health. He is an elected a Fellow of the American Association for the Advancement of Science.

== Early life and education ==
Ogunseitan was born in Nigeria. He attended Obafemi Awolowo University, where he started his studies in microbiology. After earning his master's degree in 1983, Ogunseitan moved to the United States. He joined the University of Tennessee as a doctoral student working on environmental microbiology and microbial ecology. He earned a Master of Public Health at the University of California, Berkeley. In 1998, Ogunseitan was made a Josiah Macy Jr. Foundation Fellow at the Marine Biological Laboratory.

== Research and career ==
In 1992 Ogunseitan joined the faculty at the University of California, Irvine. His research considers the evaluation of risk factors that damage human and environmental health, including electronic waste.

Ogunseitan was the founding chair of the University of California, Irvine Department of Population Health & Disease Prevention (2007-2019). He was made University of California Presidential Chair in 2019. He serves on the Advisory Board of the UC Center Sacramento. In 1999, he was appointed as a Faculty Fellow on the Global Environmental Assessment Project at the Belfer Center for Science and International Affairs at Harvard Kennedy School at Harvard University in Cambridge, Massachusetts. In 2019, Ogunseitan was appointed to the USAID's One Health Workforce-Next Generation project, which seeks to eliminate public health crises through training programmes for health workers.

== Awards and honours ==
- 2016 National Academies of Sciences, Engineering, and Medicine Jefferson Science Fellow
- 2018 United States Department of State Meritorious Honour Award
- 2020 Elected a Fellow of the American Association for the Advancement of Science

== Selected publications ==
- Ogunseitan, O. A.; Schoenung, J. M.; Saphores, J.-D. M.; Shapiro, A. A. (2009-10-30). "The Electronics Revolution: From E-Wonderland to E-Wasteland". Science. 326 (5953): 670–671. doi:10.1126/science.1176929. ISSN 0036-8075. PMID 19900918. S2CID 33860709.
- Ogunseitan, Oladele A. (2013-10-30). "The Basel Convention and e-waste: translation of scientific uncertainty to protective policy". The Lancet Global Health. 1 (6): E313–E314. doi:10.1016/S2214-109X(13)70110-4. PMID 25104585.
- Ogunseitan, Oladele A. (2017-08-31). "US coal plans flout mercury convention". Nature. 548 (7669): 523. doi:10.1038/548523a. PMID 28858306.
- Ogunseitan, Oladele A. (2015). "The asbestos paradox: global gaps in the translational science of disease prevention". Bulletin of the World Health Organization. 93 (5): 359–360. doi:10.2471/BLT.14.142307. hdl:10665/271737. PMC 4510811. PMID 26229210.
- Awasthi, Kumar Abhishek; Li, Jinhui; Koh, Lenny; Ogunseitan, Oladele A. (2019-03-15). "Circular economy and electronic waste". Nature Electronics. 2 (3): 86–89. doi:10.1038/s41928-019-0225-2. S2CID 169132460.
- Saphores, Jean-Daniel M.; Nixon, Hilary; Ogunseitan, Oladele A.; Shapiro, Andrew A. (2016-07-26). "Household Willingness to Recycle Electronic Waste: An Application to California". Environment and Behavior. 38 (2): 183–208. doi:10.1177/0013916505279045. S2CID 155039572.
- Saphores, Jean-Daniel M.; Ogunseitan, Oladele A.; Shapiro, Andrew A. (March 2012). "Willingness to engage in a pro-environmental behavior: An analysis of e-waste recycling based on a national survey of U.S. households". Resources, Conservation and Recycling. 60: 49–63. Bibcode:2012RCR....60...49S. doi:10.1016/j.resconrec.2011.12.003.
- Ogunseitan, Oladele A. (2008-04-01). Microbial Diversity-Form and Function in Prokaryotes. Foreword by Lynn Margulis and cover citation by E. O. Wilson. John Wiley & Sons. ISBN 978-1-405-14448-3.
- Ogunseitan, Oladele A. (2011-06-01). Green Health. ISBN 9781412996884.
- Ogunseitan, Oladele A. (2020-01-22). Certification in Public Health (CPH) Q&A Exam Review. Springer. ISBN 9780826161857.
