= Eyitope Ogunbodede =

Nigerian academic (born 1957)

11th Vice-chancellor of Obafemi Awolowo University
- In office June 2017 – 6 June 2022
- Preceded by: Anthony Elujoba (acting)
- Succeeded by: Adebayo Simeon Bamire

Personal details
- Born: Eyitope Ogungbenro Ogunbodede; 23 January 1957 (age 69) Owo, Western Region, British Nigeria (now in Ondo State, Nigeria)

Eyitope Ogungbenro Ogunbodede (born 23 January 1957) is a Nigerian academic and professor of Dentistry who was the 11th substantial Vice Chancellor of Obafemi Awolowo University, Ile-Ife, Nigeria from 2017 to 2022. He is also the founder of Dema Foundation Dental Museum, the first dental museum in Africa commissioned in 2015 which contains relics of modern Nigerian dental history.

== Education ==
Ogunbodede attended Owo High School where he obtained the West African School Certificate in 1976. He then proceeded to Obafemi Awolowo University where he received a BSc in Health Sciences and a Bachelor of Dental Surgery (BchD) in 1981 and 1985 respectively. He also has a Masters in Public Health degree from the University of Lagos (1989) and was a Commonwealth Medical Fellow at University College London between 1991 and 1993.

== Career ==
Ogunbodede joined the services of Obafemi Awolowo University as a Medical Training Fellow in 1987 and became a professor in 2000. As an academic, he has published approximately 100 peer-reviewed scientific journal articles. He has authored over 40 conference abstracts and 2 books. On 8 May 2017, he was appointed the 11th Vice Chancellor of Obafemi Awolowo University which ended in May 2022.
