= Toye Sobande =

Nigerian coach

- Born: Toye Sobande; 14 December 1978 (age 47)
- Citizenship: Nigeria
- Education: Obafemi Awolowo University University of Buckingham Regent University
- Occupations: Strategic leadership expert, business management consultant, public speaker, international author and coach,
- Known for: CEO/President of Stephens Leadership Consultancy LLC and Publisher of the African Leadership Journal.
- Website: toyesobande.com

Toye Sobande (born 14 December 1978) is a leadership coach, management consultant, lawyer, author, public speaker, and trainer. He is the CEO/President of Stephens Leadership Consultancy LLC, a strategy and management consulting firm offering services to businesses and leaders. He holds a Doctorate of Strategic Leadership from Regent University, Virginia Beach, US. He is known for his writing and speaking about the relational dynamics of leadership and followership, succession management systems, organisational health and cultural engagement, strategic foresight, and innovation.

== Early life and education ==
Toye Sobande was born in Lagos Island at the Lagos Island Maternity Hospital in Lagos, Nigeria, to Stephen Olanrewaju Sobande and Abigail Oladunni Sobande.

He attended St. Agnes Primary School, Maryland, Ikeja, and proceeded to Ikeja Grammar School, Bolade, Oshodi for the Senior Secondary Certificate Examinations (SSCE), conducted by the West African Examinations Council (WAEC). He enrolled at Lagos State Polytechnic (LASPOTECH, now known as Lagos State University of Science and Technology), for the Ordinary National Diploma (OND) in Accounting and Business Studies and served in the leadership of the Student Union.

Later, he proceeded to study Law at the Obafemi Awolowo University (OAU), Ile-Ife, and later continued his education at Nigerian Law School in Abuja. After completing his one-year National Youth Service Corps programme, he furthered his legal education, earning a Master's Degree in International Commercial Law from the University of Buckingham, United Kingdom and a PhD in Strategic leadership from Regent University, Virginia Beach, United States.

== Career ==
He initially worked as a teacher at Adams College, instructing in Business Studies, Government, Literature, and Physical Education. Subsequently, he joined African Independent Television (AIT), contributing to production and programs. He became one of the panelists on the popular youth program ‘It's Our Time’ and the National School Quiz and Debate Competition, among various other youth-oriented television programmes.

He started his legal career as an intern at Emmanuel Chambers, Chief Afe Babalola and Co. During his first degree at Obafemi Awolowo University, he launched a school called Charis Leadership School. He worked with the Citizens Advice Bureau, UK, and the British Heart Foundation. He is the author of two leadership books: The Leadership Myth and Leadership and Organizational Politics.

He is a weekly columnist with BusinessDay Nigeria. The column is popularly known as "The Leadership Factory with Toye Sobande" where he writes on leader-follower dynamics, leadership, team leadership, followership organizational health, workplace politics cross-cultural competence, and engagement. He has published on a variety of subjects on leadership for Vanguard (Nigeria), The Guardian (Nigeria), The Punch, Leadership.

He has also been featured in other media outlets such as different Channels TV, Silverbird Group Television, Arise News TV, Nigerian Television Authority (NTA), Nigeria Info 95.1 FM, Inspiration FM 92.3 FM, Eko FM 89.75 FM, Lagos Traffic Radio 96.1 FM, where he has made significant contributions to critical leadership issues.

He is a member of different professional associations showcasing his continuous learning and professional development.⁣⁣ Some of affiliations include membership in the Association of Leadership Educators (ALE), where he contributes to the discourse on leadership education. He is a Fellow at the Institute of Certified Management Consultant (CMC), International Leadership Association (ILA) and the Society of International Economic Law. He is a member of the Nigerian Bar Association, where he contributes to the legal community.

== Books and publications ==
Sobande is the author of the following books:

- The Leadership Myth – Why Leadership Principle Do Not Work In Sub-Saharan Africa. ISBN 9781919602202
- Leadership and Organizational Politics: How to win office politics and Thrive in a Competitive Environment. ISBN 978-1-9196022-2-6

== Awards and recognitions ==
- Recipient of the International Merit Award by The Nest
- Excellence Award by the Global Leadership Institute (GLI)
- Loraine Chafer Award at Dallas Theological Seminary (DTS)
