= Obafemi Awolowo University =

Public university in Ile-Ife, Nigeria

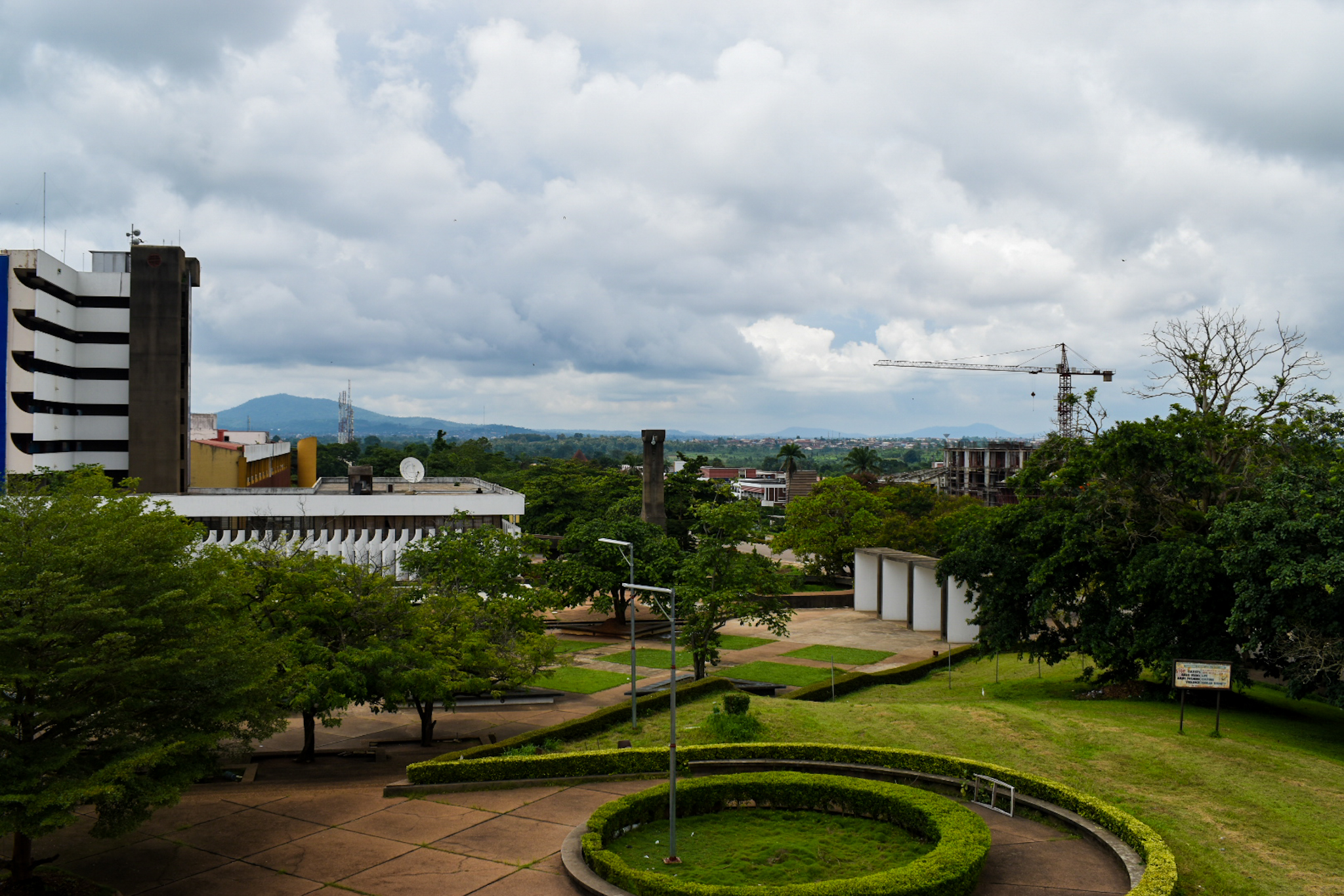
- School's landscape
- Former name: University of Ife
- Motto: For Learning and Culture
- Type: Public
- Established: 1961; 65 years ago
- Affiliations: Adeyemi College of Education
- Chancellor: Yahaya Abubakar
- Vice-Chancellor: Adebayo Simeon Bamire
- Students: c. 35,000
- Undergraduates: 13,000
- Postgraduates: 7500
- Location: Ile-Ife, Osun State, Nigeria; 7°31′06″N 4°31′22″E
- Campus: Urban 2,020 hectares (5,000 acres)
- Colours: Midnight blue and gold
- Website: www.oauife.edu.ng

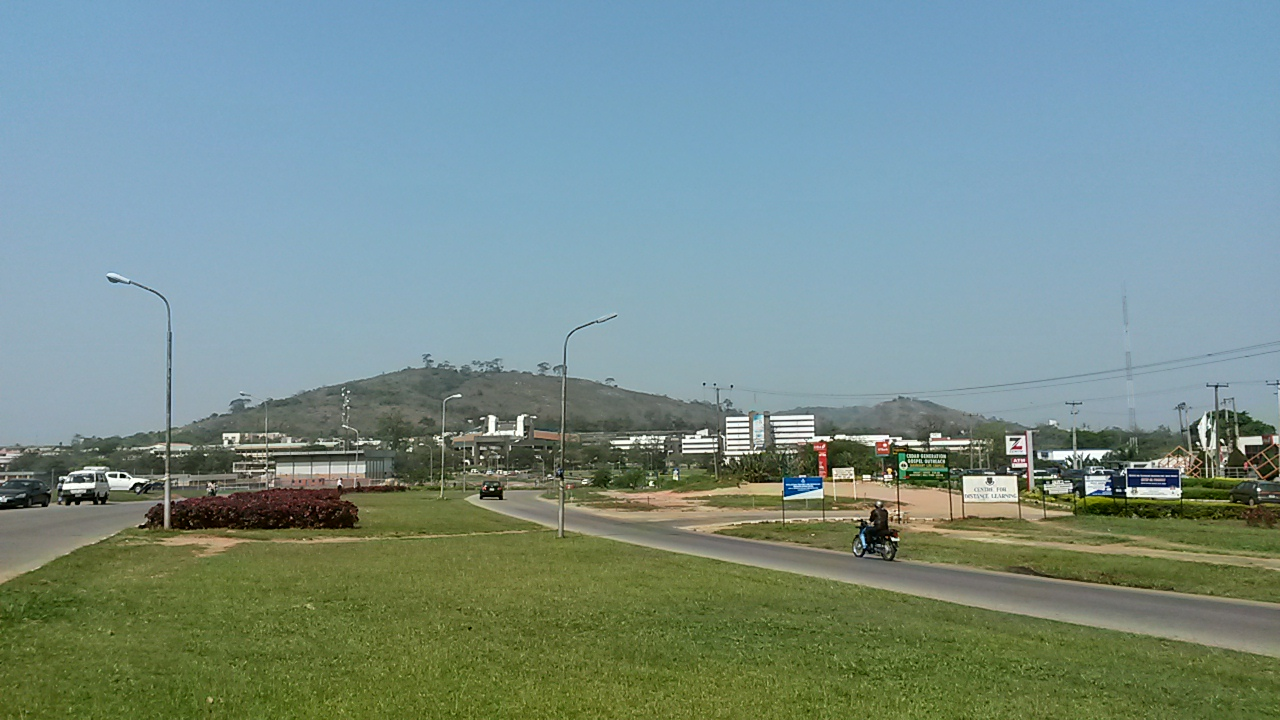
Main Campus

Obafemi Awolowo University (OAU), formerly known as the University of Ife, is a federal university in Ile-Ife, Osun State, Nigeria. The university was founded in 1961 by the regional government of Western Nigeria led by Samuel Ladoke Akintola, and classes commenced in October 1962. The university was renamed on 12 May 1987 by Ibrahim Babangida to honour Obafemi Awolowo (1909–1987), the first premier of the Western Region, who initially thought of the idea of establishing the university.

== History ==
In 1951, following the adoption of a new constitution, major changes were made to elected legislatures and regional Premier. Because education was viewed as a key driver of change and development, the new regional administrations prioritised the expansion of basic and secondary education.

A commission was established by the Federal Minister of Education in 1959 to study the nation's projected needs for university graduates between 1960 and 1980. The commission was headed by Cambridge lecturer Eric Ashby, a master at Clare College, Cambridge, and also included labour economist Frederick H. Harbison. The expectation of the commission's final report by the Western Region government was that the University of Ibadan would satisfy the needs of the Western Region, a position on which the federal government disagreed. Before a final report was submitted in October 1960, the Western government began preparations for the establishment of a university in the region.

The decision to establish the University of Ife by the ruling Action Group party of the Western Region of Nigeria was in protest at the recommendations of the Ashby Report. The first Nigerian university was established in 1948 at Ibadan in the Western Region as an external college of the University of London. The needs of Nigeria (then a British colony), however, exceeded the productivity of the country's only university. In particular, the University of Ibadan had no faculty of engineering or technology, law school, pharmacy school or management training abilities. The Ashby Commission, which was set up by the British, was to review the tertiary education needs of the soon-to-be-independent nation of Nigeria. The government of the Western Region did not want to rely on federal universities or those of other regions to admit its numerous secondary school leavers. The University at Ife was founded as a rebuttal to the perceived politicization of higher education opportunities in Nigeria and the Western Region and was designed to fill the gaps in manpower needs.

In October 1960, the Ashby commission recommended additional regional universities in the northern and eastern regions of Nigeria, and another federal university in the Lagos protectorate, but none in the more educationally advanced Western Region, which had a "free and universal primary education" program. A minority report that was accepted by the government recommended a new university within the Western Region and facilities of the Nigerian College of Arts, Science and Technology, Ibadan, were provided to the region. In 1961, a vote establishing the Provisional Council of the university was passed by the Western Regional Assembly. The final site chosen, a 13,000 acres (5,300 ha) of land, was donated by the people of Ile-Ife for the proposed university. The first financial grant provided for the university was £250,000 from the Western regional government.

== Ibadan Campus ==
On 22 September 1962, the university was opened to 244 students at its temporary facilities, the previous College of Arts and Sciences, Ibadan. Some of the new students were previously at the College of Arts and Sciences, and some staff were recruited from University College, Ibadan, and from abroad. Oladele Ajose was nominated as the first Vice-Chancellor of the university, which began with faculties of agriculture, arts, economics and social studies, law and science. The style of administration of the university and faculties was similar to University College, Ibadan, and during its foundation, it established a relationship with the University of Wisconsin. Adverse political conditions within the region delayed the move from Ibadan to Ife.

In February 1966, Lt-Col Francis Adekunle Fajuyi, the Visitor of the University of Ife and the first Military Governor of the Western Region, appointed Hezekiah Oluwasanmi as the new Vice-Chancellor, and Chief TT Solaru as the pro-chancellor, and gave them money and orders to relocate to the permanent campus by October 1966. Fajuyi was killed at Ibadan in the military mutiny of July 1966 and did not witness the movement he orchestrated. Fajuyi Hall, a residential hall, was named to honour his contributions.

== Move to Ife ==
The university's move to the new campus at Ile-Ife began in January 1967. The campus at Ife had the first faculty of pharmacy in West Africa, the first department of chemical engineering, and the first faculty of electronics components and electrical engineering. Its medical school started with an integrated curriculum and community orientation, which was later adopted by the World Health Organization, and a compulsory baccalaureate (BSc honours) before gaining entrance to the clinical school, but this was later abandoned.

== Federal University ==
In 1975, a new military government introduced decrees making the University of Ife a Federal University.

On 10 July 1999, members of the Black Axe Confraternity murdered the secretary-general of the students' union George Iwilade and several other student activists in the Obafemi Awolowo University massacre. Education Minister Tunde Adeniran issued a statement acknowledging the incident and saying the ministry will treat the case with "utmost concern".

== Architecture ==
Israeli architect Arieh Sharon led the architectural planning of the university with a team that later included his son Eldar Sharon and Augustine Akhuemokhan Egbor of Lagos. The initial plan was to build three communities. A central campus with a high density would host the academic and administrative structures, the staff quarters with residential structures be dispersed for privacy, and students' residential halls were built.

== Central Campus ==
The road network within the university is numbered, the main entrance to the university is the 2.5 km Road One which provides visibility to two rocky hills and a main core. The core is a quadrangle consisting of the university's public structures: Hezekiah Oluwasanmi Library, Secretariat, University Bookshop, Oduduwa Hall, and the Faculties of Arts, Education, Law, Administration and Social Sciences.

The first structure to be completed in January 1967 was three blocks of four floors, which became the Humanities building; these blocks have interconnected walkways to the other Faculties within the quad. Upon completion, these structures resembled inverted pyramids or huge boats but the design was chosen because of the country's humid tropical climate that way, each floor protects the one below.

There are pedestrian walkways and pergolas around the campus, providing movement within offices around the quadrangle, and there are also piazzas, gardens and terraces. The quad is enclosed on each side by roads, beyond which are other faculty buildings.

The inner road on the southern end (road two) or front of the main core provides access to the student union building. Along road two are the computer science building, and the faculties of pharmacy and health sciences. The outer road at the north-western end of the quad, (Road 5) provides access to the modern languages building and the African traditional-designed structure housing the African studies department, a museum and an exhibition hall.

== Academics ==
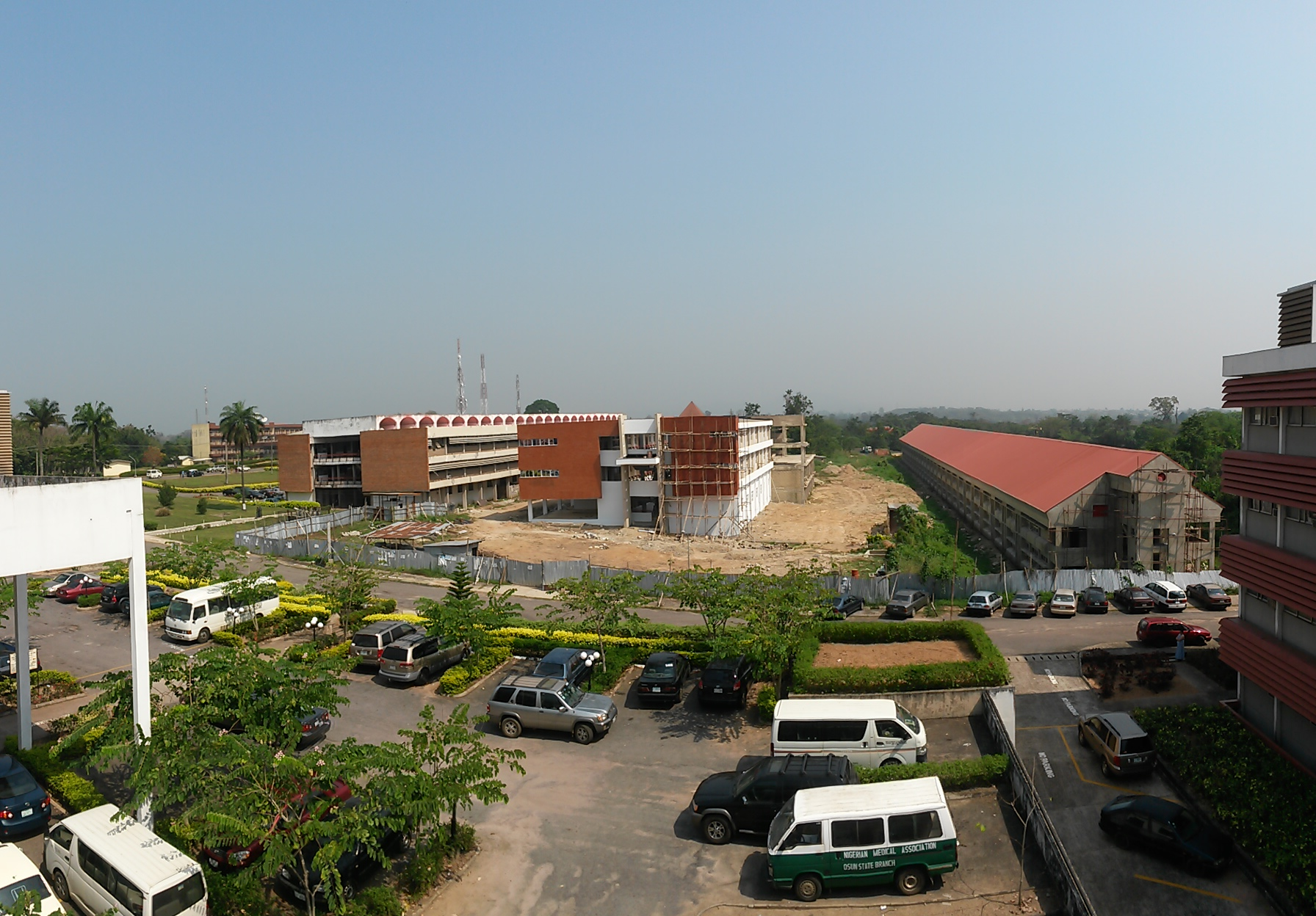
College of Health Sciences, Obafemi Awolowo University, Ile-Ife, Osun State, Nigeria

Obafemi Awolowo University has 15 faculties and two colleges—the Postgraduate College and the College of Health Sciences— which are administered in more than 60 departments. The university offers undergraduate and postgraduate programmes in fields of specialization spanning the humanities, arts, natural sciences, social sciences, medical sciences, engineering and technology. It was previously associated with Loma Linda University in California, US.

Two newly accredited faculties which includes Faculty of Nursing and Faculty of Computing was recently accredited November 2025 and July 2024 respectively

== JUPEB Programme ==
Obafemi Awolowo University has been a partner University to the Joint Universities Preliminary Examinations Board (JUPEB). JUPEB offers A-Level programs to students seeking admission into Obafemi Awolowo University via direct entry. OAU currently admits students into the JUPEB Program Y.

== Library ==
The central library, known as Hezekiah Oluwasanmi Library, (named after the second Vice-Chancellor, Professor Hezekiah Olusawanmi) consists of two multi-storey wings in the centre of the campus. It has a seating capacity of 2,500 with the availability of Internet access to books and journals. It is a depository for the publications of the United Nations and its agencies including UNESCO, ILO and ECA. The library collection includes over 300,000 titles and 762,000 volumes of monographs, government publications, theses and audio-visual material, in addition to the subscription of over 1,000 journals in hard format. The library collection is accessible to users through Online Public Access Catalogue (OPAC) and the library's circulation services are fully computerized. 297,352 records have been converted to electronic format and the digitization of its newspaper collection has been done by online Computers Library Corporation, Inc. of Ohio, US. The university library also enjoyed financial support from the Carnegie Corporation for computerization of the library, this gave birth to the opening of the e-library in July 2008 for the use of staff and students of the university. The current University is Olukemi Fadehan.

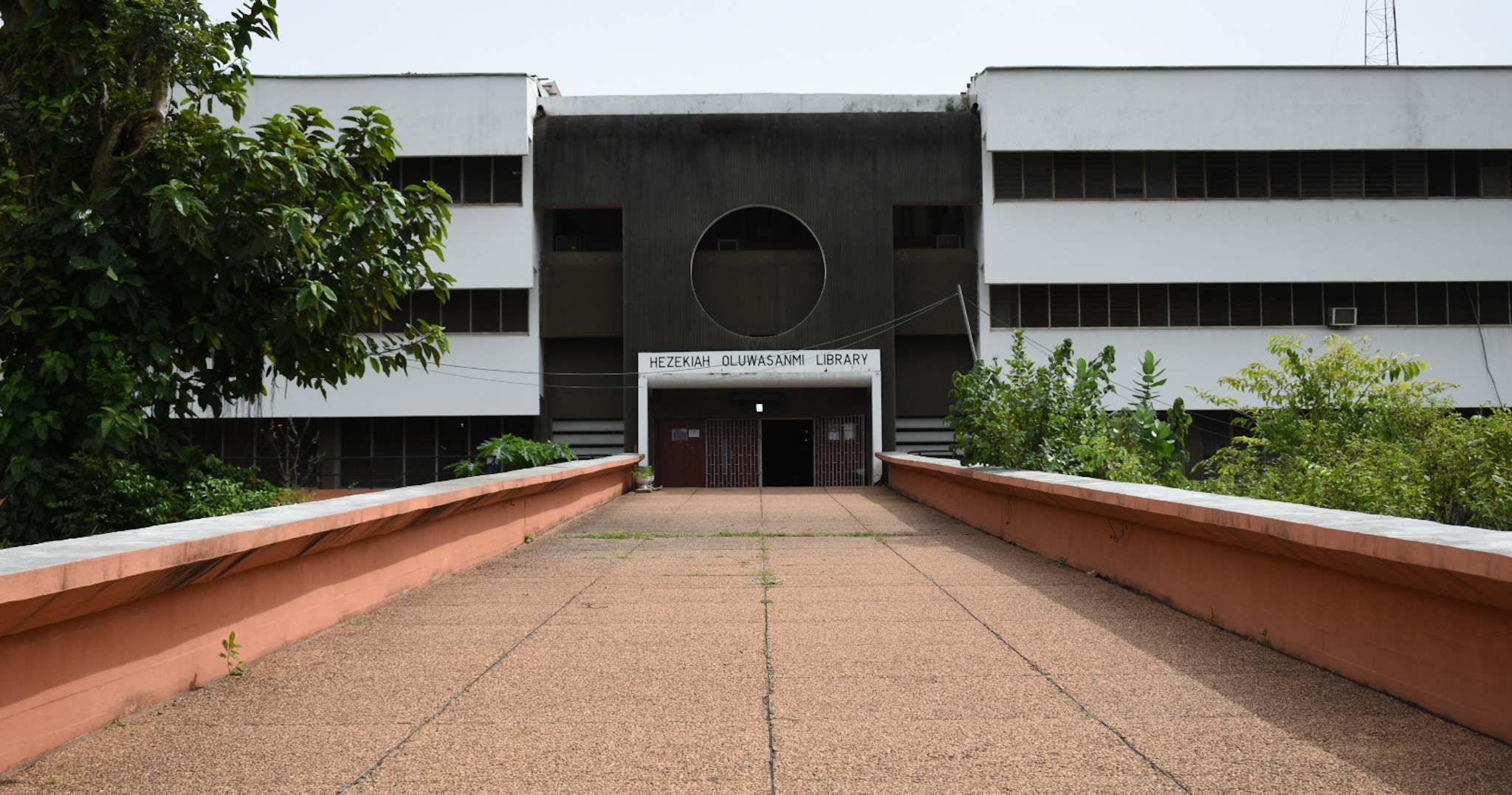
Hezekiah Oluwasanmi library

== Information Technology and Communications Unit ==
Obafemi Awolowo University has a Information and Communication Technology (ICT) system with its own V-SAT access to the Internet, and an Intranet. Virtually every building in the central campus is connected, and cybercafés are available in parts of the campus. The internet access bandwidth has been increased from 39 Mbit/s as of October 2011 to 183 Mbit/s. The increase also led to the expansion of the internet facilities to all the halls of residence on campus. The Information Technology and Communications Unit (INTECU) is responsible for developing Obafemi Awolowo University into Nigeria's leading ICT University with a campus-wide network consisting of a fibre optic backbone, 23 intra-networked subnets and wireless access clouds (WiFi) distributed across the site.

== Medical and Health Facilities ==
The medical and health centre provides hazardous primary healthcare services to the community, the poor, and children and adults whose lives are endangered, and provides health education services on demand. It operates a 24-hour service and has 16-bed spaces for admitted patients. Extreme cases are referred to the nearby teaching hospital for intensive care. The health centre is divided into nine functional units.

== Research ==
The medical research facilities are located in the teaching hospital, Obafemi Awolowo University Teaching Hospitals Complex, comprising the Ife State Hospital, the Wesley Guild Hospital Ilesha, Comprehensive Health Centres, and the multidisciplinary laboratories at the main University Campus.

The University Teaching Hospital is consistently cited as a highly reputable teaching hospital based on its numerous records. It has served as a training site for Nigerian foreign-trained doctors, who are required to pass the medical licensing examination organized by the Medical and Dental Council of Nigeria. The operation for the first Siamese twins to be separated in sub-Saharan Africa was carried out at its teaching hospital, Obafemi Awolowo University Teaching Hospital. Consequently, the separation of Siamese twins has been successfully carried out on different occasions, while successful cochlear implantation has been performed repeatedly in the otorhinolaryngology unit.

The university pioneered the resuscitation and modernization of the traditional bronze-casting technology. It also pioneered the introduction of entrepreneurship education at the undergraduate level and this has now been adopted nationally and by the National Universities Commission (NUC). It is the leading ICT University with a bandwidth of 113 Mbit/s as well as a pioneer in iLab. The first iLab in Africa, south of Sahara was developed and established in OAU in collaboration with MIT.

== Vice-chancellors ==
The first vice-chancellor of the university was Professor Oladele Ajose (MD, PhD), a Glasgow University graduate and Nigeria's first professor of public health, who was recruited from the University of Ibadan. He served from 1962 to 1966 until political upheavals and military coups led him to be replaced. The second vice-chancellor was Professor H. A. Oluwasanmi, who served from 1966 to 1975. Anthony Adebolu Elujoba, a professor of pharmacognosy, became the Acting Vice-Chancellor of the university in July 1975. The University Council's announcement of Professor Ayobami Taofeek Salami on 6 June as the University Vice-Chancellor was greeted with violence and rejection. The council was eventually dissolved by the Federal Government and Salami was removed from the post. Prof. Elujoba was given the responsibility of stabilizing the system.

The university's staff has included one Nobel Laureate and six Nigerian National Merit Award winners and has pioneered kidney transplants in Nigeria.

Nigeria's only Nobel Prize-winner in literature and the first African laureate, Wole Soyinka, served as Professor of Comparative Literature at the University of Ife from 1975 to 1999. In 1999, he was appointed an emeritus Professor of Dramatic Arts at the university.

Stephen Adebanji Akintoye served as Director of the Institute of African Studies from 1974 to 1977.

== List of Vice-chancellors ==
- Oladele Ajose (1962–66)
- Hezekiah Adedunmola Oluwasanmi (1966–75)
- Ojetunji Aboyade (1975–78)
- Cyril Agodi Onwumechili (1979–82)
- Wande Abimbola (1982–89)
- C. Adeniyi Osuntogun (1990–91)
- Wale Omole (1991–99)
- Roger Makanjuola (1999–2006)
- Micheal Oladimeji Faborode (2006–11)
- Idowu Bamitale Omole (2011–16)
- Anthony Elujoba (as acting from 2016 to 2017)
- Eyitope Ogungbenro Ogunbodede (2017–2022)
- Adebayo Simeon Bamire (2022–present)

== Halls of residence ==
The Ile-Ife campus is built on about 5,000 acres (20 km^{2}) on a site comprising 13,000 acres (53 km^{2}) of university-owned land. Its halls of residence include:

- Awolowo Hall
- Angola Hall
- Alumni Hall
- Education Trust Fund (ETF) Hall
- Adekunle Fajuyi Hall (FAJ)
- Ladoke Akintola Hall
- Moremi Hall
- Mozambique Hall (Moz)
- Murtala Muhammed Post Graduate Hall

The Male halls are Awolowo Hall, Angola Hall, ETF Hall and Fajuyi Hall. The female halls are Alumni Hall, Ladoke Akintola Hall, Moremi Hall, and Mozambique Hall. The postgraduate hall, Murtala Muhammed Hall, is a mixed hall.

== Students' union ==
Obafemi Awolowo University is known as the "Jerusalem" of Aluta because of the antecedents of her students in vibrant and radical unionism over the years. The Student Union arm historically boast of a special kind of aluta where destruction of properties is not allowed during protest, popularly known as the scientific aluta.

However, in the last few years, the radicalism of the union is gradually becoming history. The union has produced vibrant unionists and political leaders, including but not limited to the famous lawyer, Femi Falana, Paul Alaje, Olorunwa Adeleke, and many others.

The Students of the school also believe the school environment is one of the safest in the country, where any student can move around the school even at odd hours, without the fear of attack from anyone.

In April 2022, a case of fraud came to light by the former president of the union, Dr Ibk, who was remanded by a court of law after stealing 700,000 shortly after the swearing-in of the new executives.

The new executives came in shortly after the Electoral Commission led by Ajayi Oluwafemi (Efem Castro) from the Faculty of Social Sciences as the chairman, where Akinbinu Foyin from Nursing served as the General Secretary, Olalekan Olatunbosun Onaopemipo (The Catalyst) from the Faculty of Education served as the Public Relations Officer and Osatoyinbo Opemidimeji from the Faculty of Sciences served as the Financial Secretary, with nine other commissioners from other faculties.

David Olaoye (also known as "Elemoh") who served as the Public Relations Officer (PRO) of the Great Ife Students' Union Elections Petitions Committee in 2023, Honorable Member of the Great Ife Students' Union Student Representative Council (SRC) from 2024 up till 2025 and Chairman, Great Ife Students' Union Elections Petitions is often credited as one of the most influential student politicians of modern Great Ife.

== Sports ==
The sports centre is located on the central campus and provides indoor and outdoor sports. The centre is equipped with modern facilities and the students participate in competitive sports such as those organized by the Nigerian University Games Association (NUGA) and West African University's Games (WAUG). Recreational facilities including basketball courts and table tennis in each of the halls of residence. The Staff Club, with its swimming pool, is available for registered staff members and their guests.

The university's sports centre hosted the Nigerian University Games Association (NUGA) championships in 1970, 1984 and 2013. The sports centre is equipped with an IAAD-compliant swimming pool, tartan track, volleyball court, tennis court, squash court, hockey pitch, two football pitches (including one with a covered pavilion), gymnasium and an indoor multipurpose sports court.

From 15 to 22 December 2023, the university hosted the West African University's Games (WAUG), where about twenty universities across Nigeria, Senegal and Ghana participated. That was the second time the university hosted the event within the last 50 years.

== Notable alumni ==
=== Government and politics ===
- Adebayo Adelabu, Deputy Governor Central Bank of Nigeria since 2014.
- Bisi Adeleye-Fayemi, co-founder African Women's Development Fund (AWDF)
- Akinwumi Adesina, President of African Development Bank & former Nigerian Minister of Agriculture and Rural Development
- Femi Adesina, Special Adviser to President Buhari on media and publicity
- Oladapo Afolabi, former Head of Nigerian Civil Service
- Jimi Agbaje, Lagos State Governorship candidate
- Alexander Akinyele, former Nigerian Minister of Information
- Sarah Alade, former Deputy Governor Central Bank of Nigeria
- Seyi Asagun, finance executive
- Bisayo Busari-Akinnadeju
- Babalola Borishade, former Nigeria Minister of Aviation
- Abike Dabiri, former Member of the House of Representatives
- Kayode Fayemi, former Governor of Ekiti State
- Lucky Irabor, former Chief of Defence Staff of Nigeria
- Olusegun Mimiko, former Governor of Ondo State, Nigeria
- Lai Mohammed, Nigerian Minister of Information and Culture
- Babafemi Ojudu, Senator of Ekiti State, Nigeria
- Olatunde Ojo, Clerk to the national assembly of Nigeria
- Babajide Omoworare, Senator of Osun State, Nigeria
- Dominic Oneya, former Governor Kano State, Nigeria
- Olusegun Oni, former Governor of Ekiti State, Nigeria
- Fidelis Oyakhilome, former Governor Rivers State, Nigeria
- Olagunsoye Oyinlola, former Governor of Osun State, and former military governor of Lagos State, Nigeria
- Amal Pepple, former Nigerian Minister of Lands, Housing & Urban Development and former Head of Nigerian Civil Service
- Adebayo Shittu, Former Minister of Communication
- Remi Tinubu, current First Lady of Nigeria, former First Lady and Senator of Lagos State, Nigeria

=== Business ===
- Olajumoke Adenowo, Nigerian architect and businesswoman
- Bola Akindele, entrepreneur, business strategist and philanthropist
- Demola Aladekomo, computer engineer, technology expert, entrepreneur and philanthropist
- Ibukun Awosika, chairman, First Bank Nigeria
- Ayoola Dominic, President and Co-Founder of Koolboks
- Yemisi Edun, first female MD/CEO of First City Monument Bank
- Jimoh Ibrahim, lawyer, Nigerian billionaire
- Noah Ibrahim, Nigerian real estate entrepreneur
- Dele Momodu, Nigerian journalist and businessman and CEO of Ovation International Magazine
- Oluremi Odunsi , Nigerian Entrepreneur and women advocate
- Bidemi Oke is a Nigerian entrepreneur
- Funke Opeke, MD Main One
- Funke Osibodu, ex-CEO of Union and Eco Banks
- Femi Otedola, Nigerian Oil billionaire
- Tinuade Sanda, currently managing director of Eko Electricity Distribution Company
- Toye Sobande, business management consultant, strategic leadership expert, lawyer, author, public speaker, and trainer.

=== Law ===
- Adewole Adebayo, Nigerian lawyer, former Presidential Candidate of Social Democratic Party (Nigeria) and founder of KAFTAN TV.
- Oluwarotimi Odunayo Akeredolu, former Governor of Ondo State
- Yusuf Olaolu Ali, lawyer, Senior Advocate of Nigeria
- Fatou Bensouda, Chief Prosecutor of the International Criminal Court in the Hague
- Femi Falana, Nigerian Human Rights Lawyer
- Nkemdilim Izuako, Nigerian Judge and member of the United Nations Dispute Tribunal
- Toki Mabogunje, Nigerian lawyer
- Nwali Sylvester Ngwuta, CFR, Justice of the Supreme Court of Nigeria
- Karimot Odebode, Nigerian lawyer and education advocate.
- Helen Prest-Ajayi, Nigerian lawyer, writer and former beauty queen.

=== Arts and media ===
- 2Baba, Nigerian artist. He was given an honorary degree during his Fellowship award from Department of Music
- Aderounmu Adejumoke, Nigerian actor and filmmaker
- Olusegun Adeniyi, former presidential spokesman for the late President Umaru Musa Yar'Adua and chairman of the editorial board, Thisday Newspaper
- Kunle Adewale, Nigerian artist and International Advocate For persons living Sickle Cell Anemia.
- Stephen Adewale, Nigerian Journalist, Chairman of Social Democratic Party (Nigeria) in Ondo State and Head of Station of KAFTAN TV
- Toyin Adewale-Gabriel, Nigerian literary critic, poet and writer
- Roseline Adewuyi, Nigerian French translator and gender advocate.
- Funso Aiyejina, Nigerian poet, short story writer and playwright, Dean of Humanities and Education University of West Indies
- Ibiyinka Alao, artist
- Woli Arole, Nigerian comedian
- Asake, Nigerian hip-hop musician and music artist
- Biyi Bandele, Nigerian novelist and playwright
- Blaqbonez, Nigerian rapper
- Femi Branch, Nigerian actor
- Chinko Ekun, Nigerian singer and rapper
- Femi Euba, Nigerian actor and dramatist
- Dizzy K Falola, UK-based Nigerian singer
- Peter Fatomilola, actor and playwright
- Obafemi Obadare, Nigerian journalist
- Rogers Ofime, Actor and film producer
- Dotun Popoola, Sculptor and Painter
- Fireboy DML, Nigerian singer and songwriter signed to YBNL Nation
- Tade Ipadeola, lawyer, prize-winning poet and author. President of PEN Nigeria
- Lagbaja, Nigerian artist
- MC Lively, Nigerian Comedian
- Sam Nda-Isaiah, chairman and publisher at Leadership (newspaper), Nigeria.
- Wole Oguntokun, lawyer, Nigerian playwright, stage and film director, theatre administrator and newspaper columnist
- Steph-Nora Okere, Nigerian actress.
- Osonye Tess Onwueme, Nigerian playwright, poet and Professor of Global letters
- Adesuwa Onyenokwe
- Seun Osewa, founder of Nairaland
- Muraina Oyelami, painter, drummer and actor
- Afeez Oyetoro, actor and comedian
- Yemi Shodimu, Nigerian actor and Director

=== Academia ===
- O. C. Adesina, Professor of history at the University of Ibadan and Global Professor of History at the University of Manchester
- Adenike Akinsemolu, Environmental sustainability advocate, educator, author, a social entrepreneur, lecturer at Obafemi Awolowo University
- Akintunde Akinwande, Professor in the Electrical Engineering and Computer Science Department of the Massachusetts Institute of Technology
- Bolaji Aluko, Professor of Chemical Engineering at Howard University, Washington DC, currently Vice-Chancellor of the Federal University Otuoke, Bayelsa State
- Karin Barber, Professor of African Cultural Anthropology at the University of Birmingham, England
- Toyin Falola, Nigerian historian and Professor of African studies
- Adesegun Fatusi, vice chancellor, University of Medical Sciences, Ondo, Ondo state
- Francisca Oboh Ikuenobe, Professor and Head of Geology and Geophysics at Missouri University of Science and Technology
- Femi Mimiko, Professor of Political Science and former Vice Chancellor of Adekunle Ajasin University, Akungba Akoko Ondo state, Nigeria
- Dele Ogunseitan, Professor of Public Health at the University of California, Irvine
- Folasade Ogunsola, Professor of Microbiology former Provost of College of Medicine University of Lagos, currently Vice Chancellor University of Lagos
- Funmi Olonisakin, Professor of Security, Leadership and Development at King's College London, United Kingdom
- Bamitale Omole, Professor of International Relations and Former Vice Chancellor (Obafemi Awolowo University)
- Teresa N. Washington, Academic, author, and activist

=== Royalty and society ===
- Pastor Enoch Adeboye, General Overseer, RCCG
- Adesimbo Victor Kiladejo, Traditional Ruler of Ondo Kingdom, Nigeria
- Felix Orji, bishop of the Anglican Diocese of All Nations

=== Technology ===
- Ernest Ndukwe, is a Nigerian Electrical engineer and former chief executive officer of the Nigerian Communications Commission, NCC.
- Gbenga Sesan, a social entrepreneur, information and communications technology professional

== See also ==
- List of universities in Nigeria
- Education in Nigeria
