= Nigerian University Games Association =

Nigerian Games University Association
- Formation: 1966; 60 years ago
- Headquarters: 2FJW+M6C, Ahmadu Bello Way, Garki 2 900103, Abuja, Nigeria
- The President: The President of Nigerian University Games Association (NUGA), Prof Stephen Hamafyelto,
- Website: http://nugabestwestafrica.com/

The Nigerian University Games Association (NUGA) organizes university-level sports events in Nigeria. It hosts an interuniversity sports competition called the University Games. The first NUGA games were held at the University of Ibadan in 1966. 36 Nigerian universities are members.

NUGA approves fifteen different sporting events at the University Games: track and field, badminton, basketball, chess, cricket, handball, hockey, judo, soccer, squash, swimming, table tennis, taekwondo, tennis, and volleyball.

== History ==
NUGA was founded in 1966 at the University of Ibadan following the first West African University Games (WAUG) in Ibadan in 1965.

In 1966, the first Nigerian University Games was held at the University of Ibadan the five Universities in Nigeria at that time namely: University of Ife (now Obafemi Awolowo University), Ile-Ife; University of Nigeria, Nsukka; University of Lagos, Akoka and Ahmadu Bello University, Zaria.

Presently, there are over eighty Universities as members of NUGA and this cut across private and public (Federal and State) owned.

At the beginning, only very few sports were involved but the number of sports have over time grown to Eighteen namely: Athletics, Badminton, Basketball, Chess, Cricket, E-sport, Football, Handball, Hockey, Judo, Karate, Scrabble, Squash, Swimming, Table Tennis, Taekwondo, Tennis and Volleyball.

Over the years, many University athletes have represented Nigeria at various international competitions like the Commonwealth and Olympic Games. Some of the notable ones include Seyi Olofinjana (Football), Vincent Enyeama (Football), Bisi Afoloabi (Athletics), Olumide Oyedeji (Basketball), Chika Chukwumerije (Taekwondo) and Olusoji Fasuba (Athletics), who is the current African record holder in 100 metres (Men) with a time of 9.85 seconds.

It is pertinent to add that many more University athletes have turned professional after completing their University education.

In 1970, NUGA became a member of the World Federation of University Games (FISU), and in 1974 was a founding member of the All Africa University Games Association (FASU).

== Winners by medals table ==
The number of gold medals won in the competition are written in parentheses.

Year	Host	Champions	Runners-up	Third place	Fourth place
2025 (27th edition)	University of Jos	Benson Idahosa University (34)	University of Jos (50)	University of Benin (34)	Delta State University, Abraka (32)
2022 (26th edition)	University of Lagos	University of Port Harcourt (31)	University of Lagos (16)	Nile University of Nigeria (6)	Ignatius Ajuru University of Education (5)
2017 (25th edition)	University of Agriculture, Makurdi	University of Port Harcourt (70)	Ahmadu Bello University (11)	Benson Idahosa University (10)	University of Lagos (9)
2014 (24th edition)	Obafemi Awolowo University	University of Port Harcourt (63)	University of Lagos (13)	Obafemi Awolowo University (12)	Ahmadu Bello University (9)
2011 (23rd edition)	University of Benin	University of Port Harcourt (46)	University of Nigeria (15)	Obafemi Awolowo University (13)	University of Benin (10)
2009 (22nd edition)	University of Nigeria Nsukka				
2007 (21st edition)	University of Maiduguri				
2004 (20th edition)	University of Port Harcourt				
2002 (19th edition)	University of Ibadan				
2001 (18th edition)	Ahmadu Bello University	Ahmadu Bello University (40)	University of Port Harcourt (19)	University of Ibadan (13)	University of Benin (9)
1998 (17th edition)	University of Lagos				
1997 (16th edition)	Bayero University Kano				
1994 (15th edition)	Bayero University Kano				
1992 (14th edition)	University of Ilorin				
1990 (13th edition)	University of Calabar				
1988 (12th edition)	University of Port Harcourt				
1986 (11th edition)	University of Ibadan				
1984 (10th edition)	Obafemi Awolowo University				
1982 (9th edition)	Ahmadu Bello University				
1980 (8th edition)	University of Benin				
1978 (7th edition)	University of Lagos				
1976 (6th edition)	University of Ibadan				
1974 (5th edition)	University of Nigeria Nsukka				
1972 (4th edition)	Ahmadu Bello University				
1970 (3rd edition)	Obafemi Awolowo University				
1968 (2nd edition)	University of Lagos				
1966 (1st edition)	University of Ibadan				
