= Obafemi Obadare =

Nigerian journalist and news editor

Obafemi Obadare is a Nigerian journalist, editor, and chairman of the editorial board of The Punch, a Nigerian daily newspaper. He is a graduate of Obafemi Awolowo University, Ile-Ife, Osun State, where he studied Philosophy.

== Education ==
In 1977, Obadare obtained his Primary School Leaving Certificate at St. Stephen's ‘A’ Primary School, Alapata, Modakeke. He proceeded to St. John's Grammar School, Oke-Atan, Ile-Ife, Osun State, where he received his West African Senior School Certificate Examination (WASSCE) in 1982. In 1989, he earned a Bachelor of Arts in Philosophy from OAU.

== Career ==
Obadare joined the news crew of The Punch in November 2000 after a stint at Newsline Minna and Sunray, a Port Harcourt-based print publications firm. He began as a Sports Correspondent at The Punch and rose through the ranks to become Sunday Editor and later Saturday Editor (2010–2012) of the newspaper organisation. In 2013, he was promoted to the Editorial Board. On 1 May 2024, Obadare assumed office as The Punch Editorial Board Chairman. While serving as the Chief Sports Correspondent, he conducted exclusive interviews with notable figures in soccer and basketball, including Masai Ujiri, a former Nigeria international.

== Awards ==
On 15 December 2024, The Punch under his leadership won 11 awards in different categories, including the Editorial Writing category with an editorial titled “Resolving Nigeria's food, nutrition crisis” at the Nigerian Media Merit Awards.
