= St. Clements University =

St Clements University is a higher education institution which has reported itself to be registered in the Turks and Caicos Islands. Its website lists a number of affiliations and recognitions and a network of over 10 centres and offices in a number of countries. Since 2005 it has established locally registered autonomous schools, St Clements University Higher Education School in Niue, St Clements University in Somalia, and the Université Suisse Privée St Cléments (St Clements Private Swiss University).

== Accreditation status ==
St Clements University Higher Education School in Niue states that it was licensed by the Niue Minister of Higher Education in March 2005 and is approved by the Association of Computer Professionals and the Association of Tourism and Hospitality Executives to teach their programs.

St Clements University states that its operation in Somalia was accredited by the Transitional Federal Government of Somalia in 2007.

The Université Suisse Privée St Cléments states that it was registered in the Swiss canton of Vaud in 2009 and offers joint programs with the Institute of Professional Financial Managers, the Institute of Management Specialists, Design, Technology and Management Society International, the International Institute of Engineers, the International Guild of Academians and the Institute of Human Resource Management.

St Clements University has no United States accreditation. It is not accredited according to Oregon, Texas, Michigan, and Maine official government listings. According to the United States Department of Education, unaccredited degrees and credits may be unacceptable to employers or other institutions and restricted or illegal in some jurisdictions, e.g. St Clements University degrees are illegal to use in Texas and have restrictions to their use in Oregon.

The Oregon Office of Degree Authorization reports that the government of New Zealand treats the St. Clements operation in Niue as being "substandard" and has requested "that its degrees not be included in international listings."

In 2020, St. Clements University appointed Roderick Andrew Lee Ford, an American attorney and former judge advocate attorney in the United States Army, as its chancellor and whose primary mission is to review all university programmes, accreditation status, and policies in an effort to upgrade its academic standing in various states in the United States, the United Kingdom, Canada, the British West Indies, Africa, Asia, and Europe.

== Australian controversy ==
In 1999, under parliamentary privilege, Senator Kim Carr referred to a number of institutions including St Clements University which, in his opinion, were operating from Australia as "degree mills". He said that when a member of his staff contacted the company identified as administering St Clements it was discovered that it was also a whisky distributing company and alleged educational services company. Senator Carr subsequently referred to St Clements as reminiscent of "the famous pirates of old ... using legal devices and incompetence by government ministers and making a bridgehead into this country’s educational institutions" and as being operated out of a "grog shop" (Australian slang for a liquor store).
