= Axxela =

Nigerian natural gas and electricity company

- Formerly: Oando Gas & Power Limited
- Industry: Energy & Utilities
- Founded: 2000; 26 years ago
- Headquarters: Lagos, Nigeria
- Key people: Bolaji Osunsanya (CEO)
- Products: Natural Gas, Power, Energy Infrastructure Development
- Owner: Afrigaz Energie LLP; Levene Energy; PERSAND Limited; Energy & LLP
- Parent: BlueCore Gas InfraCo Limited
- Website: www.axxelagroup.com

Axxela (formerly Oando Gas & Power Limited) is a natural gas value chain company that processes natural gas, transmission and distribution, as well as power generation and distribution in Nigeria and West Africa. It reported revenue of ₦188.1 billion (about $240-250 million 2023 USD) for fiscal year 2023.

Based in Lagos, Nigeria, it was acquired by Helios Investment Partners in 2019. When it was sold again seven years later, Helios held a 70% stake in the company, while the remaining 30% was owned by Sojitz Corporation.

In January 2026, it was announced that BlueCore Gas InfraCo Limited had completed the acquisition of Axxela. BlueCore is a consortium formed by Afrigaz Energie LLP, Levene Energy Development Limited, and PERSAND Limited and Energy & LLP.

== Background ==
It is one of the first indigenous private sector-led developers of natural gas distribution in Nigeria, which serves over 200 industrial and commercial customers via a vast network of natural gas infrastructure.

Axxela is the first privately owned, independent company registered gas shipper on the West African Gas Pipeline (WAGP) and in 2021 received the Energy Leadership Excellence Award of the Decade from the African Institute for Leadership Excellence.
