= Institute of Professional Financial Managers =

Institute of Professional Financial Managers (IPFM)
- Type: British Professional body
- Industry: Treasury and Finance
- Founded: 1992; 34 years ago in the United Kingdom
- Headquarters: London, United Kingdom
- Key people: Jeff Wooller
- Website: www.ipfm.org

The Institute of Professional Financial Managers (IPFM) is a British professional body founded by Jeff Wooller in 1992. It was established to bridge the gap between the Accountancy and Treasury professions.

IPFM has established links with reciprocal bodies in UK, United States, Australia, Belgium, Canada, Russia, Ukraine, Kazakhstan, Ghana, India, Nigeria, South Africa and Zimbabwe. These bodies accept the Institute's members as their members on payment of the appropriate fee. In most instances, there is no need for IPFM members to complete application forms other than the one on joining the IPFM.

IPFM also provides educational services to Cameroon, Ethiopia, Gambia, Kenya, Swaziland and Zimbabwe. These usually take the form of IPFM approving the educational structures of local bodies and issuing certificates and diplomas.

Membership ranges from the Associate class through to the Doctoral Fellow class.
