= Robert Walters plc =

British recruitment company

- Type: Public
- Traded as: LSE: RWA
- Industry: Recruitment
- Founded: 1985; 41 years ago
- Headquarters: London, England
- Key people: Leslie Van de Walle (Chairman); Toby Fowlston (Chief Executive Officer)
- Revenue: ▼£781.1 million (2025)
- Operating income: ▼£(14.9) million (2025)
- Net income: ▼£(26.8) million (2025)
- Website: robertwalters.com

Robert Walters plc is a British recruitment company that focuses on placing professionals into permanent, contract and temporary positions. Established in 1985 by founder Robert Walters, the company has branches in 31 countries.

== History ==
The company was established by a recruitment professional, Robert Walters, in 1985.

Originally established to place accountants in London, the company now recruits across multiple disciplines. In July 1996, it was listed on the London Stock Exchange. A year later in 1997, it set up a wholly-owned subsidiary, Resource Solutions, offering recruitment process outsourcing services.

The company acquired Tristar, an Australian recruitment business in 1997 and merged with US staffing company, Staff Mark Inc., in August 1998. The company demerged two years later, re-listing on the London Stock Exchange in 2000.

In February 1999, the company launched its first global salary survey, offering an annual insight into each sector that the company operates in.

In 2001, the company acquired Dunhill Management Services, an Australian recruitment business.

In February 2008, the company acquired Talent Spotter, a Chinese recruitment business with offices in Shanghai and Suzhou.

The founder, Robert Walters, retired and was replaced by Toby Fowlston as CEO in April 2023.

In July 2024, Robert Walters Group unified its three brands, Robert Walters, Walters People and Resource Solutions into a single brand, Robert Walters.
