= List of radio stations in Nigeria =

This is a list of radio stations in Nigeria organized by frequency and location.

== States and territories ==
=== Federal Capital Territory (FCT) ===
- 88.3 - NYSC Radio
- 89.7 – Independent Radio
- 89.9 - University of Abuja
- 90.3 – Central FM
- 90.9 – Max FM
- 91.3 - Radio Marria Abuja
- 91.5 - Clean beat
- 92.1 – Vision FM
- 92.7 – [trustradio.com.ng Trust
- 92.9 – [kapitalfm.gov.ng Kapital FM] (FRCN)
- 93.5 – Aso Radio
- 93.7 – Citizen FM
- 93.9 – Jordan FM
- 94.3 – Classic FM
- 94.7 – Rhythm FM, Abuja
- 95.1 – Nigeria Info
- 95.3 - Municipal Radio Abuja
- 95.5 – Boss FM
- 95.7 - Gralvin Radio
- 96.1 – voice of the people FM
- 96.3 – Soundcity Radio, Abuja
- 96.9 – Cool FM, Abuja
- 97.3 - EFCC radio
- 97.9 – The Beat
- 98.3 – Hot FM, Abuja
- 98.7 – Bright FM
- 99.1 – Nigeria Police Radio
- 99.3 -Real FM
- 99.5 – Wazobia FM, Abuja
- 99.7 -Montage FM
- 99.9 – Kiss FM
- 100.5 – Raypower, Abuja
- 100.7 - Lounge Fm * 101.1 – Human Rights Radio,
- 101.7 – Kids FM
- 102.3 – Eagles FM
- 103.1 - Rewind Fm * 103.3 - Liberty Radio Abuja
- 103.5 - Simans Fm * 104.1 – Rahma Radio Abuja
- 104.5 – Family Love
- 104.9 - Democracy Radio Abuja
- 105.3 - Blue print Fm * 105.5 – people's FM
- 106.3 – WE FM
- 106.7 – Nigeria Customs Broadcasting Network
- 107.1 – National Traffic Radio
- 107.7 – Armed Forces Radio

=== Abia State ===
- 88.1 – Broadcasting Corporation of Abia State (BCA) Radio, Umuahia
- 89.7 – Buzz FM, Aba
- 90.9 – Gregory FM (GUU)
- 91.3 – Sun FM, Igbere
- 91.9 – Sun FM, Aba
- 93.3 – Rhema FM
- 94.3 – Enyimba FM, Aba
- 94.9 – Flo FM, Umuahia
- 95.3 – Spin 95.3 FM, Umuahia
- 96.5 – Rapid FM, Umuahia
- 97.9 – Bourdex FM
- 98.3 – Legend FM, Aba
- 99.1 – Real FM, Aba
- 99.9 – Love FM, Aguiyi Ironsi layout, Umuahia
- 101.9 – Rose FM, Aba
- 102.9 – Magic FM Aba
- 103.5 – Pace Setter FM, Amakanma old Umuahia
- 104.1 – Vision Africa, Umuahia
- 107.1 – Green FM, (MOUAU)

=== Adamawa State ===
==== AM ====
- 917 – AM Radio Gotel, Yola
- 1440 – ABC AM, Yola

==== FM ====
- 88.7 – Pakka FM, Mubi
- 89.9 – NAS FM, Yola
- 91.1 – FM Gotel, Yola
- 92.3 – Pulaaku FM, Yola
- 95.4 – Usaku FM, Yola
- 95.7 – ABC FM, Yola
- 96.7 – HD Press FM, Mubi
- 99.6 – Amana FM Gella, Mubi
- 101.5 – Fombina FM, Yola
- 105.5 – NAS FM, Mubi
- 106.3 – ABC Hong
- 108.0 – Federal Poly FM, Mubi

=== Akwa Ibom State ===
- 88.7 – THE MIXX 88.7 FM
- 89.9 – Premium FM
- 90.5 – AKBC
- 90.9 – Memories 90.9 FM
- 94.5 – Passion FM
- 95.1 – Comfort FM
- 96.5 – Memories FM
- 100.7 – UNIUYO FM (University of Uyo)
- 101.1 – Planet FM
- 102.7 – TangSio FM
- 104.5 – Atlantic FM
- 101.5 – Redemption FM
- 104.9 – Heritage FM (Heritage Polytechnic, Eket)
- 105.5 – Paradise FM
- 105.9 – Inspiration 105.9 FM
- 106.9 – XL 106.9 FM
- 107.5 – Gospel Revolution FM

=== Anambra State ===
- 88.5 – Anambra Broadcasting Service, Awka
- 88.9 – Brila FM, Onitsha
- 89.4 – Minaj FM, Obosi
- 89.7 – City Radio, Onitsha
- 90.1 – Lumen FM, Uga
- 90.7 – Anambra Broadcasting Service, Onitsha
- 91.5 – Blaze FM, Oraifite
- 91.9 – Authority FM, Nnewi
- 93.3 – Madonna Radio (Madonna University) FM, Okija
- 93.7 – Wazobia FM, Onitsha
- 94.1 – Unizik (Nnamdi Azikiwe University) FM, Awka
- 95.3 – Radio Sapientia FM, Onitsha
- 97.1 – Choice FM, Nnewi
- 97.8 – Moment FM (Federal Polytechnic Oko), Oko
- 98.3 – Ogene FM, Awka
- 99.1 – Odenigbo FM, Obosi
- 101.7 – Omega FM, Umuchu
- 101.9 – Kpakpando FM, Mbaukwu
- 102.5 – Purity FM, Awka (FRCN)
- 103.5 – Gist FM, Ogidi
- 104.7 - Udala Radio, Onitsha
- 106.1 – Uniojukwu FM, (Chukwuemeka Odumegwu Ojukwu University), Igbariam
- 106.5 – Alpha FM, Nnobi
- 107.1 – Tansian Radio (Tansian University) FM, Umunya

==== Online ====
- Gospel FM, Awka
- Rock FM Nigeria, Nnewi

=== Bauchi State ===
==== AM ====
- 990 – BRC1 AM, Bauchi

==== FM ====
- 94.6 – BRC2 FM, Bauchi
- 95.7 – Raypower, Bauchi
- 97.5 – Albarka Radio, Bauchi
- 98.5 – Globe FM Bauchi, (FRCN)
- 99.5 – ATAP FM (ATA Polytechnic), Bauchi

=== Bayelsa State ===
- 93.1 – People FM, Oxbow Lake Swali, Yenagoa
- 94.7 – Silverbird Rhythm FM, Oxbow Lake Swali, Yenagoa
- 95.5 – Royal FM, Agudama-Epie, Yenagoa
- 97.1 – Bayelsa State Broadcasting Corporation (BSBC) Glory FM, Radio Bayelsa, Ekekim, Yenagoa
- 98.1 – Wilberforce Island FM, Ndu Radio
- 102.5 – Raypower, Elebele, Yenagoa
- 106.5 – Creek FM, Radio Nigeria, Yenagoa

=== Benue State ===
- 89.9 – Benue State University, BSU FM, Makurdi
- 90.5 – Brothers FM, Makurdi
- 93.3 – Choice FM, Oju
- 95.0 – Radio Benue, Makurdi
- 95.5 – Agate Radio, Star FM, Makurdi
- 96.5 – Joy FM, Otukpo
- 98.5 – ASKiNG RADiO Tiv (Online)
- 99.9 – Ashiwaves FM, Katsina-Ala
- 103.1 – Sun Rays FM, Korinya City, Konshisha
- 103.5 – Harvest FM, Makurdi
- 90.9 - Sounds Smith FM, Gboko
- 93.5 - Radio Maria, Makurdi
- 91.5 - Radio Maria, Gboko

=== Borno State ===
- 90.7 – GAME FM
- 94.5 – BRTV Borno Radio, Maiduguri
- 95.3 – BRTV Metropolitan FM, Maiduguri
- 96.1 – Al Ansar Radio
- 97.7 – Kanem FM (Unimaid Radio)
- 98.5 – Harmony Radio, Biu
- 98.9 – Dandal Kura Radio
- 99.5 – Freedom Radio, Maiduguri
- 102.5 – Peace FM 102.5 Maiduguri (FRCN)
- 108.0 – Lafiya Dole, Maiduguri
- 88.5 FM - Ndarason

=== Cross River State ===
- 89.7 – CRBC, Ikom
- 92.3 – Sparkling FM, Calabar
- 92.6 – Cross River Radio
- 93.1 – FAD FM, Calabar
- 95.9 – Hit FM, Calabar
- 97.3 – Correct FM, Calabar
- 99.5 – Canaan City FM, Calabar
- 105.5 – CRBC (Paradise) FM, Calabar

=== Delta State ===
- 83.3 – Demodels Nigeria FM
- 88.6 – Melody FM, Warri
- 89.1 – Mega FM, Udu, Warri
- 89.9 – Crown FM, Effurun
- 90.7 – Current FM, Effurun
- 93.1 – Quest FM, Ughelli-Patani Road, Ogor
- 94.7 – Crown FM, Asaba
- 95.1 – JFM, Otu Jeremi
- 96.1 – Raypower, Oghara
- 96.5 – Hot FM, Asaba
- 97.9 – Voice of Delta Radio, Asaba
- 98.7 – Bridge Radio, Asaba
- 100.5 – Kpoko FM, Warri (Pidgin Broadcast)
- 100.9 – Trend FM, Asaba
- 103.7 – Delta State University (Delsu FM), Abraka
- 106.7 – Rize FM, Warri

==== Online ====
- CCN Radio Live, Asaba

=== Ebonyi State ===
- 88.3 – Glorious FM, Abakaliki
- 93.3 – EBSU FM, Abakaliki
- 95.1 – Legacy FM, Abakaliki
- 98.1 – Salt FM, Abakaliki
- 101.5 – Unity FM, Abakaliki
- 104.7 – AE FUNAI FM, Abakaliki

=== Edo State ===
- 88.1 – Super FM, Benin
- 90.5 – Okada Wonderland FM (Igbinedion University radio), Okada
- 92.3 – Independent Radio, Benin City
- 92.7 – K-U FM, Benin-Auchi Road, Benin City
- 93.7 – SilverBird Rhythm FM, Ugbowo, Benin City
- 94.1 – Hillside FM (Auchi Polytechnic radio), Auchi
- 94.3 – Izibili FM, Ikpoba Hill
- 95.7 – Edo Broadcasting Service, Aduwawa
- 96.9 – Speed FM, Benin City
- 97.3 – Vibes FM, Benin City
- 98.1 – B-Side FM, Benin City
- 100.1 – Uniben FM (University of Benin radio), Benin City
- 101.5 – Bronze FM (FRCN), Aduwawa
- 105.5 – RayPower FM, Ikhuen Niro, Benin City

=== Ekiti State ===
- 89.9 FM – Voice FM, Ado-Ekiti
- 90.5 FM – Midas FM, Iworoko Road, Ado-Ekiti
- 91.5 FM – Ekiti FM (BSES), Ilokun, Ado-Ekiti
- 92.7 FM – New Cruse FM, Ikere-Ekiti
- 95.1 FM – Ayoba FM, Fajuyi, Ado-Ekiti
- 100.5 FM – FRCN Progress FM, Iworoko Road, Ado Ekiti
- 104.1 FM – Our People's FM, Fajuyi, Ado Ekiti
- 106.9 FM – Fresh FM, Falegan, Ado-Ekiti
- 107.7 FM – Adamimogo, Ido-Ekiti
- 99.7 Sunsplash FM - Efon Alaaye Ekiti
- 102.3 Ebi Nla FM - Ado Ekiti
- 96.3 Bamidele Olumilua University of Science and Technology FM -Ikere Ekiti
- 88.1 Afe Babalola university FM - Ado Ekiti
- 89.3 Arena FM - Ado Ekiti

=== Enugu State ===
==== AM ====
- 828 – Radio Nigeria 1 Enugu Enugu

==== FM ====
- 91.1 – Soundcity Radio, Enugu
- 91.1 – Lion FM (University of Nigeria, Nsukka)
- 92.5 – Dream FM, Enugu
- 92.9 – Coal City FM (FRCN)
- 94.5 – Urban Radio, Enugu
- 96.1 – Sunrise FM, Enugu
- 96.7 – Voice FM, Nsukka (FRCN)
- 98.7 – Caritas University Radio
- 99.3 – Afia Radio
- 99.5 – Owelle FM
- 99.9 – Family Love FM, Ngwo, Enugu
- 100.3 – Udoka FM
- 100.9 – Solid FM
- 101.3 – Divine FM, Trans Ekulu, Enugu
- 102.9 – Correct FM, Enugu
- 104.3 – Volt FM, Independence Layout, Enugu
- 104.9 – Prime Sports FM, Enugu
- 105.5 – Energy FM Enugu
- 106.5 – Stallion FM (Federal College of Education, Ehu-Amufu)
- 106.5 – ESUT RADIO, Enugu
- 106.9 – Gouni FM (Godfrey Okoye University) Radio, Enugu
- 107.2 – IMT RADIO, Enugu

=== Gombe State ===
==== AM ====
- 1404 – Gombe (GMC) AM

==== FM ====
- 89.1 – FUK Campus FM
- 91.9 – Gombe (GMC) FM
- 92.7 – Vision FM
- 93.1 – Raypower FM
- 97.3 – Progress Radio FM
- 98.1 – Amana Radio FM
- 103.5 – Jewel (FRCN) FM

==== Online ====
- Hausaxpress24 Radio
- Nagari Radio
- Naka Sai Naka Radio
- Zamani Radio

=== Imo State ===
- 89.3 – Gold FM, Owerri
- 90.1 – Radio Oguta, Oguta
- 90.9 – IMSU STAR FM
- 92.7 – One Radio
- 93.9 – Rock FM, Owerri
- 94.1 – Ojemba FM, Owerri
- 94.5 – Orient FM (Imo Broadcasting Corporation), Owerri
- 96.1 – Osiza Radio, Owerri
- 97.3 – Megaband FM, Owerri
- 98.1 – Groove FM, Owerri
- 98.7 – Federal Polytechnic Owerri FM
- 99.5 – Hot FM, Owerri
- 100.5 – Heartland FM, Owerri
- 100.7 - Echo FM, Owerri
- 101.1 – My Radio FM, Owerri
- 104.9 – The Reach FM
- 105.7 – Zanders FM, Owerri
- 106.1 - Ozioma FM Orlu
- 107.3 – Darling FM, Owerri
- 106.7 - Radio Maria

==== Online ====
- Shekinah Radio, Owerri
- Ojimba Radio, Owerri

=== Jigawa State ===
==== AM ====
- 1026 – Radio Jigawa AM

==== FM ====
- 93.5 – FM Andaza
- 95.5 – Dutse New World FM (JRC)
- 95.5 – Radio FM Hadejia (JRC)
- 95.5 – Community FM, Birnin Kudu (JRC)
- 95.5 – Kazaure Community FM
- 95.5 – Radio FM Ringim (JRC)
- 97.5 – FM Radio Kaugama (JRC)
- 99.5 – Freedom Radio, Dutse
- 100.5 – Horizon FM, Dutse, FRCN
- 104.9 – Sawaba FM, Hadejia

=== Kaduna State ===
==== AM ====
- 639 – Kada 1 (KSMC)
- 747 – Nagarta Radio
- 594 – FRCN (Hausa), Kadu
- 1107 – FRCN (English), Kaduna

==== FM ====
- 88.9 – Brila FM
- 89.5 – Hyai FM
- 89.9 – Kada 2 FM, Kaduna (KSMC)
- 89.9 – Rockside FM, Kafanchan (KSMC)
- 90.9 – Capital Sounds FM, Kaduna (KSMC)
- 91.7 – Liberty Radio (English), Kaduna
- 92.1 – Karama FM, Kaduna (FRCN)
- 92.5 – Vision FM, Kaduna
- 92.9 – Freedom Radio FM, Kaduna
- 93.1 – NUBA FM (Nuhu Bammalli Polytechnic Radio)
- 93.7 – FCE Zaria FM
- 94.1 – Queen FM, Zaria (KSMC)
- 94.3 – Correct FM, Kaduna
- 96.1 – Supreme FM, Kaduna (FRCN)
- 97.7 – Alheri Radio FM, Kaduna
- 98.5 – KASU FM (Kaduna State University radio)
- 98.9 – Invicta FM, Kaduna
- 99.9 – Human Right Radio, Kaduna
- 101.1 – ABU Samaru FM, Zaria
- 102.5 – Teachers Radio (Nigeria Institute of Teachers NTI)
- 102.7 – Spider FM (Kaduna Polytechnic radio)
- 103.1 – Liberty Radio (Hausa), Kaduna
- 106.5 – Raypower, Kaduna

==== Online ====
- People Voice No. 1 Radio

=== Kano State ===
==== AM ====
- 549 – Manoma Radio AM
- 729 – Radio Kano I

==== FM ====
- 88.5 – Dala FM
- 89.3 – Radio Kano II FM
- 90.3 – Express Radio
- 90.7 – Ammasco FM
- 91.1 – Himma Radio FM
- 91.3 – SoundCity FM
- 91.1 - Tech FM
- 92.3 – Muhasa FM
- 92.5 – Vision FM Kano
- 93.1 – Arewa Radio
- 93.7 – Hikima Radio
- 94.5 – Liberal Radio
- 94.7 – Guarantee Radio
- 94.9 – Gidauniya FM
- 95.1 – Wazobia FM
- 96.5 – WUA Community Radio
- 96.9 – Cool FM
- 97.3 – Rahma Radio
- 98.1 – Jalla Radio
- 98.5 – Nasara Radio FM
- 98.9 – B.U.K. FM
- 99.5 – Freedom Radio
- 100.7 – Correct FM
- 101.1 – ARTV FM
- 101.9 – GCMX Gezawa
- 102.7 – Premier Radio
- 103.3 – Liberty Radio, Kano
- 103.5 – Pyramid FM (FRCN)
- 103.9 – Aminci Radio
- 104.1 – S-Radio FM
- 104.7 – Salam Africa Radio
- 105.5 – Kanawa FM
- 106.5 – Raypower

==== Online ====
- Alfarma Radio Kano Online
- Citad Radio
- Fasaha Radio
- Haske Progressive Media
- Jareda Radio
- Jarida Radio
- Mayk Express Online Radio, Kibiya
- Waraka Radio

=== Katsina State ===
==== AM ====
- 972 – Katsina State Radio, Katsina

==== FM ====
- 88.9 – Martaba FM, Funtua
- 91.5 – Alfijir Radio, Katsina
- 92.1 – Vision FM, Katsina
- 92.9 – Hamada FM, Katsina
- 97.5 – Gram FM, Katsina
- 98.7 – Legend FM, Daura
- 104.5 – Radio Nigeria Companion FM, Katsina (FRCN)
- 106.5 – Raypower, Katsina

=== Kebbi State ===
==== AM ====
- 945 – Kebbi State Radio, Birnin

==== FM ====
- 89.1 – Haske FM Radio, Gwandu
- 92.9 – Vision FM, Birnin
- 93.9 – Brinkle FM, Zuru
- 99.9 – Rayhaan Radio, Birnin
- 103.5 – Equity FM, Birnin
- 91.1 - Lead FM, Birnin

=== Kogi State ===
- 91.7 – Fusion FM, Anyigba (Kogi State University campus radio)
- 93.5 – Radio Kogi, Otite
- 94.0 – Confluence FM, Lokoja
- 95.5 – Grace FM, Lokoja
- 97.1 – Kogi FM, Egbe
- 101.5 – Prime FM (FRCN)
- 101.9 – Tao FM, Okene
- 102.7 – Jatto FM, Okene
- 102.7 – Otite FM

" 90.5 - Kogi fm Ochaja

Online Radio

- Jatto fm Okene
- Igala Radio Idah

3 94.1 Confluence fm

=== Kwara State ===
==== AM ====
- 612.8 – Radio Kwara, Ilorin

==== FM ====
- 88.7 – Diamond FM, Ilorin
- 89.3 – Unilorin FM
- 89.9 – Albarka FM, Ilorin
- 90.9 – Igbomina FM
- 92.5 – O FM, Gaa-Imam Area, Ilorin
- 92.7 – Flow FM 92.7, Ilorin
- 95.1 – Royal FM, Ilorin
- 96.3 – SBS FM, Oloje, Ilorin
- 98.5 - Emirate FM, Ilorin
- 99.1 – Midland FM (Radio Kwara), Ilorin
- 101.9 – Sobi FM, Ilorin
- 102.5 – Tiwa ni Tiwa (TNT) FM, Ijagbo
- 103.5 – Harmony FM FRCN (Radio Nigeria), Idofian
- 103.9 – Kwasu FM, Malete
- 105.7 – Okin FM, G.R.A., Ipee Road, Offa
- 106.5 – Raypower FM, Ilorin
- 106.7 – Radio Al-Hikmah
- Kakakin FM – Ilorin

=== Lagos State ===
- 87.7 – Lounge FM
- 87.9 – Wise FM Lagos
- 88.5 – U FM
- 88.9 – Brila FM
- 89.3 – Yabatech Radio
- 89.7 – Eko FM (Lagos State Radio), Ikeja
- 89.9 - Yanga FM, EKO Atlantic City, Victoria Island, Lagos
- 90.1 – Lasgidi FM
- 90.3 – VOP FM (Voice of the People Radio), Airport Road, Ikeja
- 90.7 - Champions FM, Lagos
- 90.9 – Top Radio FM
- 91.3 – Lagos Talks FM
- 91.5 – Access 24
- 91.7 – W FM 91.7, Lagos
- 92.3 – Inspiration FM
- 92.7 – Super FM
- 92.9 – Bond FM (FRCN)
- 93.1 – Adamimogo FM, Lagos
- 93.3 – Hot Fm, Lagos
- 93.7 – Rhythm FM, Lagos
- 93.9 – Kwenu FM, Allen Avenue, Ikeja, Lagos
- 94.5 -Vybz FM, Allen Avenue, Ikeja
- 95.1 – Wazobia FM, Lagos
- 95.3 – Radio Now
- 95.5 - Lite Radio FM
- 95.7 – LASU Radio (Lagos State University radio), Ojo
- 96.1 – Lagos Traffic Radio
- 96.5 – Urban 96
- 96.9 – Cool FM, Lagos
- 97.3 – Classic FM
- 97.7 – Metro FM (FRCN)
- 98.1 – SMOOTH FM, Lagos
- 98.3 – Mainland FM
- 98.5 – Soundcity Radio, Lagos
- 98.7 – Smailz Radio
- 98.9 – Kiss FM, Lagos
- 99.1 - Galaxy FM, Radio, Allen Avenue, Ikeja
- 99.3 – Nigeria Info
- 99.7 – Jubilee FM, Igando, Lagos
- 99.9 – The Beat FM, Ikoyi
- 100.5 – RayPower FM, Alagbado, Lagos.
- 101.5 – Star FM, Ikeja
- 102.1 – Hi-Impact FM
- 102.3 – Max FM Lagos
- 102.7 – Naija FM
- 103.1 – Unilag FM (University of Lagos)
- 103.5 – Choice FM (Radio One) (FRCN)
- 103.9 – LAW FM Lagos
- 104.3 – Correct FM
- 104.5 – FAME FM Lagos
- 104.7 – SMAFM, Lagos
- 105.1 – City FM
- 105.3 – Fresh FM, Oregun
- 105.5 – Jordan FM
- 105.9 – NOUN FM (National Open University of Nigeria), Victoria Island
- 106.5 – Faaji FM (Raypower FM)
- 107.1 – R2 Radio
- 107.5 – Radio Lagos (Eko FM), Ikeja
- 107.9 - Rewind FM, Lagos

==== Online ====
- Balogun Radio Ikorodu online radio
- Green Radio, Lagos
- Pidgin Radio, Ogudu G.R.A.
- Reel Radio, Alimosho (No 1 Music, Lifestyle and Sports Station)
- Rock FM Nigeria, Lekki

=== Nasarawa State ===
- 91.1 – Platinum Radio, Keffi
- 92.3 – Option FM, Akwanga
- 92.5 – NBS, Keffi
- 95.9 – Maloney FM, Keffi
- 97.1 – Nasarawa Broadcasting Service, Lafia
- 99.9 – Breeze FM, Lafia
- 101.1 – Nasarawa State University Mass Communication Department FM
- 102.5 – Precious FM, Lafia (FRCN)
- 108 – Kizito FM

=== Niger State ===
- 88.5 – Zuma FM, Suleja
- 89.1 – Click FM, Lapai (Ibrahim Babangida University Radio)
- 89.3 – Standard FM, Bida (The Federal Polytechnic Bida)
- 90.1 – Badeggi Radio, Minna
- 90.5 – Victory FM, Minna
- 91.2 – Crystal Radio, Minna
- 91.3 – Crystal Radio, Bida
- 91.7 – Prestige FM, Minna
- 92.3 – Search FM, Minna (Federal University of Technology Minna Radio)
- 100.5 – Power FM, Bida (FRCN)
- 103.9 – Ultimate FM, Minna (College of Education Minna Radio)

=== Ogun State ===
==== AM ====
- 603 – OGBC 1, Abeokuta

==== FM ====
- 87.5 – Arystocratz Radio (AR87.5fm), Cele, Ijebu-ode
- 87.9 – Best Afro FM, Abeokuta
- 88.1 – Smash FM Abeokuta, Abiola Way, Abeokuta
- 88.3 – Remo Radio FM (community radio), Ikenne Remo
- 88.5 – Family FM Radio, Abeokuta
- 89.1 – Hope FM, Ilisan-Remo (Babcock University radio)
- 89.5 – FUNAAB Radio, Abeokuta (Federal University of Agriculture, Abeokuta radio)
- 90.5 – OGBC FM, Abeokuta
- 91.7 – Women FM, Arepo, Isheri
- 92.1 – OOU FM, Ago-Iwoye (Olabisi Onabanjo University radio)
- 93.1 – Miliki FM, Gudugba, Ewekoro
- 94.1 – Rainbow FM
- 94.5 – Paramount FM, Abeokuta (FRCN)
- 94.7 – Dux FM, Arepo
- 95.9 – Hebron FM, Ota (Covenant University radio)
- 96.3 – Super FM, Fatai Agbolade Street, Ijebu-ode
- 97.1 – Roots FM, Abeokuta
- 97.5 – Cowry FM, Iyana Oloke, Abeokuta
- 101.9 – Rockcity FM, Rockcity Avenue, Asero, Abeokuta
- 102.5 – Eagle FM, Ilese-Ijebu
- 104.1 – Kennis FM Radio
- 104.7 – S.M.A FM, Ikofa, Ijebu-Ode
- 106.1 – RCCG Radio, Redemption Camp, Mowe
- 106.7 – Splash FM, Abiola Way, Abeokuta
- 107.1 – Sweet FM, Ibadan-Abeokuta Expressway, Abeokuta
- 107.9 – Fresh FM, Hill Top Gate, Abeokuta

=== Ondo State ===
- 88.9 – Adaba FM, Km 4 Akure-Ilesa Expressway, ilara Mokin ,
- 90.1 – CTBEATS FM, CTbeats Towers, Ayelabola Street, Off Oke Aro via Hospital road, Akure
- 90.3 – AAUA FM, Akungba-Akoko
- 91.1 – Excel FM, Ore(yet to operate )
- 91.7 – Royal FM, Great insurance building, Alagbaka, Akure
- 91.9 – Breez FM, Sunday Bus Stop, Ijoka Road, Akure
- 93.1– FUTA FM, Federal University of Technology, Akure
- 93.7 – Ejule-Nen FM (community radio) Igbodigo, Okitipupa
- 94.1 – Awawa FM, High School, opposite Ayeka, OkitiPupa
- 94.5 – Orange FM, Orita-Obele, Akure
- 95.5 – Champion FM, Ori Oke Olorun Abiola, Jegele Area, Ado Road, Akure
- 96.1 – Ray power FM, Oba-Ilé (off Air )
- 96.5 – OSRC (Alalaye) FM, Orita-Obele, Akure
- 97.4 – STJ Ore FM, 2nd floor Jofi plaza, 4A, Ondo Road, Ore Junction,
- 98.5 – Viral FM, Alagbaka, Akure
- 99.1 – Glow FM, 1 Efon Alaye Street Ijapo Estate, Akure
- 100.1 – Kàkàkí FM Community Radio, Ondo town
- 100.9 – Eki FM, Ondo
- 101.9 – Suncity FM, Ondo
- 102.1– EBO FM, ile oluji
- 102.5 – Positive FM, Ondo-Road, Akure
- 102.7– Hi-power FM, Emure Owo
- 102.9– Fresh FM, Igbatoro Road opposite School of Nursing, Alagbaka, Akure
- 103.3– RUGIPO FM, Owo
- 103.7 – Melody Fm, Akure,
- 104.5 – Empire FM, Akure
- 105.1 – Exceed FM, Ijoba, Akure, Ondo state
- 106.1 – Crest FM, Alagbaka, Akure
- 106.5 – Music and Culture FM, Ondo Town (off air)

==== Online ====
- UNIMED online Radio, university of medical, Ondo city
- Omoedema
- Don Bosco, Akure
- Adeyemi College of Education Online Radio
- Rodmed Online Radio (Akure)

=== Osun State ===
- 88.5 – Diamond FM, Ilesha
- 88.3 – Ayekooto FM, Iwo
- 89.5 – Orisun FM, Ile-Ife
- 90.3 – Tungba FM, Igbajo
- 90.5 - Ijinlẹ FM, Abere
- 90.7 - Afinju FM, Dada Estate, Osogbo
- 90.9 – Oodua FM, Toll Gate, Ile-Ife
- 91.7 – Rave FM, Oroki Estate, Osogbo
- 94.1 – Timsed FM, Oke Agboja, Ijebu Jesha
- 94.5 – Great FM, Ile-Ife (Obafemi Awolowo University radio)
- 95.1 – Raypower FM, Oke Pupa, Osogbo
- 95.5 – Gold FM, Iloko-Ijesa Road, Ilesa (FRCN)
- 96.3 – Odidere FM, Sky Limit area, Iwo
- 97.1 – InfoGiant FM, Ipetumodu, Osun
- 98.9 – Akorede Radio, Iwo
- 99.3 - Bass FM, Osogbo
- 101.5 – Crown FM, Eleyele, Ile-Ife
- 101.9 – Bowen Radio, Iwo (Bowen University radio)
- 103.1 – Unique FM, Ara Station, Okesa, Ilesa
- 103.5 – Redeemer's FM, Ede (Redeemer's University radio)
- 104.5 – Living Spring FM, Ile-Awiye, Oke Baale, Osogbo
- 104.9 – Fresh FM, Osogbo
- 105.3 - Idẹra FM, Otan Ayegbaju
- Al Qudus Islamic Internet Radio, Darul Hijirah, Iwo

==== Online ====
- Akoraye FM, Modakeke
- Empire Radio, Iwo
- Saabada FM, Modakeke
- Trybe City Radio

=== Oyo state ===
==== AM ====
- 756 – Radio O.Y.O, Ile-Akade Orita Bashorun

==== FM ====
- 87.7 – Omoluabi FM, Alaafia Street, Mokola Hill, Ibadan
- 88.1 – Gravity FM, Igboho
- 88.7 – Agidigbo FM, Ibadan
- 89.1 – Lead City University Campus Radio FM, Ibadan – Lagos Toll Gate, Ibadan
- 89.3 – Ogo-Ilu FM, Oko, Ogbomoso (FRCN)
- 89.3 – Wellsradio 89.3 FM, Oluyole Estate, Ibadan
- 89.7 – Prince FM Radio
- 89.9 - Dynasty FM, Opposite Olivet Baptist Height, Oyo
- 90.1 – Space FM, Liberty Road, Ibadan
- 90.3 – Brave FM, Igbo-Ile, Ikirun Road, Ogbomosho
- 91.1 – Crest FM, Galilee Bus Stop, Olodo, Ibadan
- 91.5 – Star FM, Secretariat, Ibadan
- 91.9 - Ilaji FM
- 92.1 – Ajilete FM, Gambari, Ogbomoso
- 92.5 – Impact Business Radio, Akobo, Ibadan
- 92.9 – Royal Root FM, Jericho Area, Ibadan
- 93.5 – Premier FM, Dugbe, Ibadan (FRCN)
- 93.7 – Vintage FM, Oluyole, Ibadan
- 93.9 – Solutions FM, Oke – Bola, Ibadan
- 94.3 – Almond FM, Ikolaba, Ibadan
- 94.9 – 32FM, Cocoa House, Ibadan
- 95.1 – Raypower FM, Dugbe, Ibadan
- 95.5 – J.FM, Jejelaiye Garden City Area, Saki
- 95.7 – Soul FM, Orita Challenge, Ibadan
- 96.3 – Oke-Ogun FM, Alaga
- 96.7 – Lagelu FM, Felele, Ibadan
- 97.3 - AIM FM & TV, Apete, Ibadan
- 97.9 – Beat FM, Bodija, Ibadan
- 98.3 – Blast FM, Ibadan
- 98.5 – Oluyole FM, Old Ife Road, Ibadan
- 99.1 – Amuludun FM, Moniya, Ibadan
- 99.5 – Correct FM, Ibadan
- 100.1 – Jamz FM, Lagelu Estate, Felele Area, Ibadan
- 100.5 – Inspiration FM, Orita Basorun, Ibadan
- 100.7 – Melody FM, Bode, Basorun, Ibadan
- 101.1 – Parrot FM, Kinnira, Ogbomosho
- 101.1 – Diamond FM, University of Ibadan, Ibadan
- 101.5 – JDN Radio, Joyce B Road, Oke Ado, Ibadan
- 101.7 – Yes Radio
- 102.3 – Petals FM, Old Bodija, Ibadan
- 102.7 – Naija FM, Bodija, Ibadan
- 103.3 – I-flier FM, Ogungbade, Adegbayi, Ibadan
- 103.5 – Honor FM, Ibadan
- 103.9 – King FM, Ibadan
- 105.1 – Adamimogo, Ibadan
- 105.3 – Success FM Mokola, Ibadan
- 105.5 – Splash FM, Felele, Ibadan
- 105.9 – Fresh FM, Lagos-Ibadan By-Pass, Ibadan
- 106.3 – Lead Radio, Ibadan.
- 106.5 – Tiwantiwa Radio Aminlujinjin, Yinka Ayefele Music House, Ibadan
- 106.7 – Pensioners FM, Ibadan
- 107.1 – Noble FM, Ibadan
- 107.5 – Life Radio, Ibadan

==== Online ====
- Alóore Radio (alooreradio.com), Agodi, Ibadan
- Ambassadors Radio
- Crown Radio and TV
- Crystal Radio, Ogbomoso
- Fortis Radio FortisRadio
- Fortress Radio, Ibadan
- Orisun Asa Radio
- Partytrain Radio
- JMPBliss Radio & TV (jmpbliss.com/online-radio), Ibadan
- Imole Radio & TV, Ogbomoso
- Primus Radio
- Salt FM Online Radio, Ibadan
- Spice Radio Nigeria, Ibadan
- Stride Radio, Ibadan
- Water Radio, Ibadan
- AIM FM & TV, Apete, Ibadan, Nigeria.
- Pidgin Pulse Radio (pidginpulse.com), Bodija, Ibadan

=== Plateau State ===
- 88.65 – Radio Plateau 1 AM 1224, Jos
- 90.1 - Dr Fish FM, Jos
- 90.5 – Peace FM, Jos
- 93.3 – Unity FM, Jos
- 93.7 – Rhythm FM, Jos
- 96.1 – ICEFMUJ (University of Jos)
- 98.9 – Rock FM (Plateau Polytechnic)
- 100.5 – Raypower FM, Jos
- 101.5 – Highland FM, Jos (FRCN)
- 101.9 – Jay FM, Jos
- 103.9 – KT FM, Bukuru
- 104.3 – Tin City FM, Jos

=== Rivers State ===
- 88.5 – Uniport Unique FM (University of Port Harcourt)
- 89.9 – Garden City FM
- 91.1 – Classic FM, Port Harcourt
- 91.7 – Wave FM
- 92.3 – Nigeria Info
- 92.7 – Naija FM, Port Harcourt
- 93.3 – Super FM, Port Harcourt
- 93.7 – Rhythm FM
- 94.1 – Wazobia FM
- 95.1 – Today FM
- 95.9 – Cool FM
- 97.7 – Family Love FM
- 98.5 – Treasure FM (FRCN)
- 99.1 – Radio Rivers
- 99.5 – Wish FM
- 99.9 – Beat FM, Port Harcourt
- 103.7 – Radio UST FM (University of Science and Technology)
- 106.5 – RayPower FM

==== Online ====
- Oralvault Radio
- 1Radio (1radio.ng/phc), Port Harcourt

=== Sokoto State ===
- 91.9 – Caliphate Radio (Nagari FM)
- 92.5 – Vision FM
- 95.5 – Garkuwa FM
- 97.1 – Rima FM
- 101.5 – Royal FM
- 93.1 - Alfijir FM

=== Taraba State ===
==== FM ====
- 88.6 – TSBS Taraba Radio, Mararaba
- 90.6 – TSBS Taraba Radio, Jalingo
- 92.4 – Rock FM, Jalingo
- 92.5 – Bliss FM, Jalingo
- 92.9 – Shinmo FM, Jalingo
- 97.6 – TSBS Taraba Radio, Serti
- 104.5 – Gift FM, Jalingo

==== Online ====
- DVC Radio

=== Yobe State ===
- 89.5 –Yobe Broadcasting Corporation (YBC), Damaturu]
- 90.5 –Wetland FM Gashua (FRCN)
- 194.5 –Sunshine FM Potiskum (FRCN)

=== Zamfara State ===
- 88.7 – Shamuwa FM, Gusau
- 91.5 – Gamji FM Radio
- 92.7 – Vision FM, Gusau
- 103.5 – Pride FM, Gusau
- 105.5 – Gold City FM (ZSRTS)
- 91.1 - Lead FM, Gusau

=== Uncategorized ===
- 93.3 – EBSU FM
- 95.1 – Legacy Salt
- 98.1 – Salt FM
- 101.5 – Unity FM
- 104.7 – Funai Radio

== See also ==
- List of newspapers in Nigeria
- List of television stations in Nigeria
- Lists of radio stations in Africa
- Federal Radio Corporation of Nigeria – FRCN
- Music of Nigeria
- Telecommunications in Nigeria
