= Shola Allyson =

Nigerian singer and songwriter (born 1971)

Olusola Allyson-Obaniyi
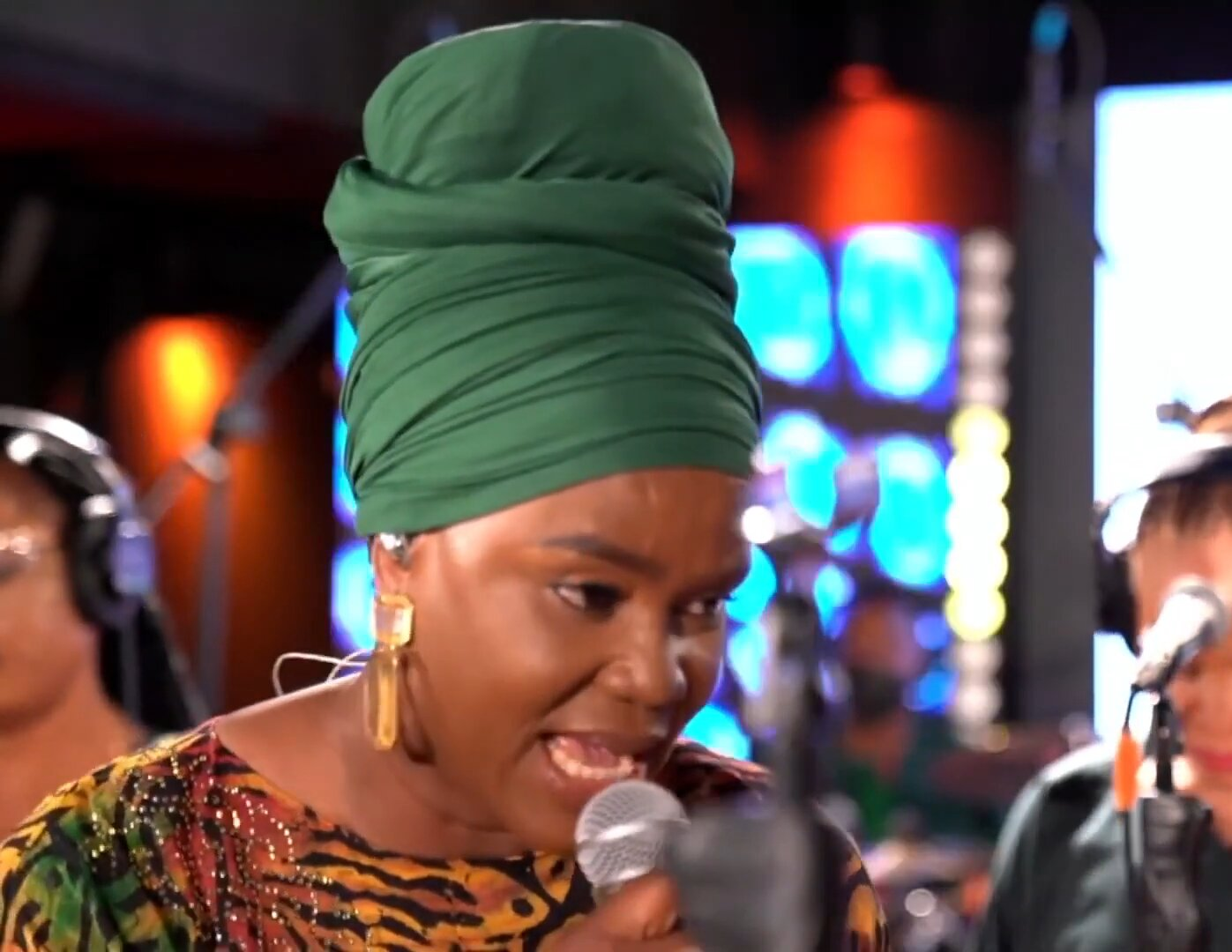

Background information
- Born: Olusola Allyson; Ikorodu, Lagos State
- Genres: Folk; soul; religious
- Occupations: Singer; song-writer; voice coach
- Years active: 2003–present
- Label: The Sola Allyson Limited
- Website: solaallyson.com

Sola Allyson-Obaniyi, popularly known as Shola Allyson or Sola Allyson (born on 24 September 1971), is a Nigerian soul, folk, singer, and songwriter. She came into limelight with the hit album Eji Owuro (2003), which was the soundtrack album for a film of the same title. After Eji Owuro, she released albums including Gbeje F'ori, Ire and Im'oore. Her popular songs include "Eji Owuro", "Obinrin Ni Mi", "Aseye", and "Isinmi". She is also a voice coach, counsellor and a consultant. She also makes music covers for Nigerian movies.

== Early life and education ==
Sola Allyson Obaniyi was born in Ikorodu, Lagos State in the early 1970s. She was born into a Muslim family.

She had her primary education at Anglican Primary School, Ikorodu, and attended Shams-el-deen Grammar School, Ikorodu for her secondary education. At Government Technical College, Agidingbi, Ikeja, she studied Business Studies and obtained an NBTE Certificate.

In 1997, she gained admission into The Polytechnic, Ibadan to study Music Technology, majoring in Voice and minoring in Music. Professor Oluwole Oladejo Adetiran mentored her music career. She later acquired a Higher National Diploma (HND) degree with an Upper Credit.

== Career ==
Allyson started her career as a backup singer in the late 1980s, when she was thirteen. She later became a professional backup singer and worked with musicians including Yinka Ayefele, Gbenga Adeboye, Pasuma, Obesere, and Daddy Showkey.

The opportunity to make her first album, Eji Owuro, came when she met a man with a movie script in a public bus. The man initiated a conversation about a film he had just concludedshooting, titled Orekelewa. Allyson was called to sing a soundtrack for the film, which led to the change in the title of the film to Eji Owuro. When the film was released, the studio decided to make a full music album for the film. The album became a huge success commercially and critically, launching Allyson into the music industry.

== Personal life ==
Allyson got married in March 2003. She met her husband, Toyin Obaniyi, in the church choir. They have three children: Ayobami, Mopelola and Obafunmiwo.

== Discography ==
=== Albums ===
- Eji Owuro (2003)
- Gbe Je F'ori (2005)
- Ire (2007)
- Im'oore (2009)
- Adun (2012)
- Ope (2015)
- Imuse (2018)
- Iri (2019)
- Isodotun (2021)
- IMISI (2022)
- SÈ'MÓLÈ Live (2025)

=== Extended plays ===
- ÌṢỌ̀ṢỌ́ (2023)
- IPIN (2024)
