= Larry Izamoje =

Nigerian journalist

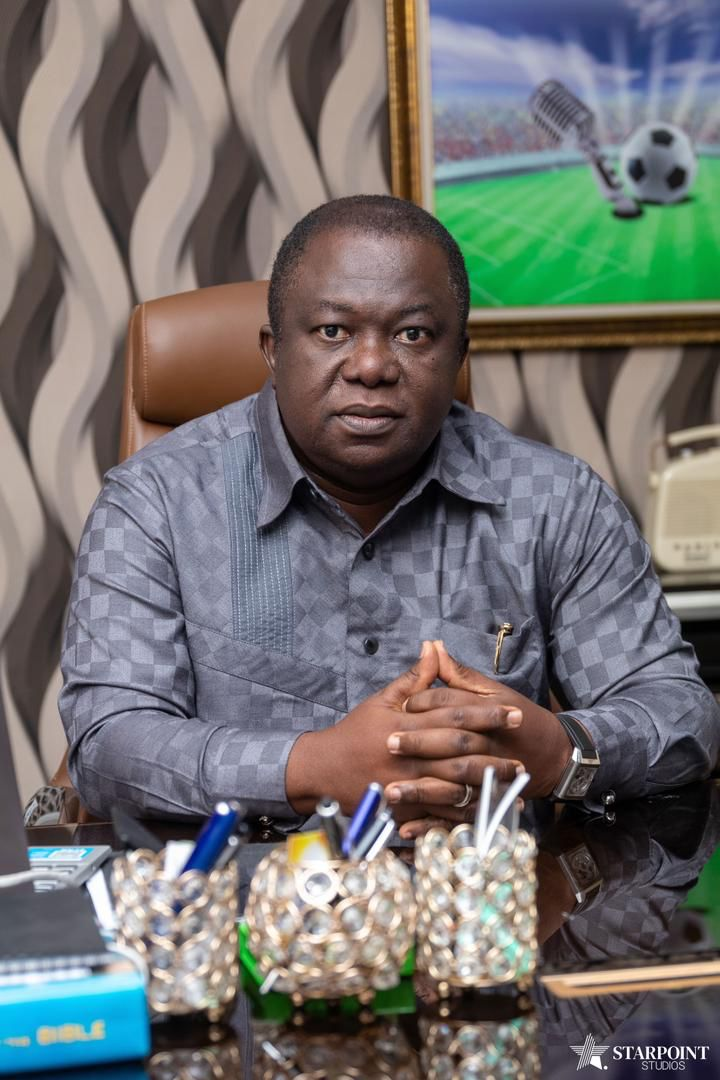
- Born: 24 February 1962 (age 64); Onitsha, Nigeria
- Education: University of Lagos
- Spouse: Bridget Larry-Izamoje (m. 1990)
- Children: 3

Dr. Larry Izamoje (born 24 February 1962) is a radio host focusing on sports radio in Nigeria. He founded Sports Radio Brila FM, Africa's first sports radio station, with operational centres in Lagos, Abuja, Port Harcourt and Onitsha.He is the Executive Chairman of Brila Media Group, a company with interests in printing, publishing, broadcasting, digital services and consultancy . Born in Onitsha, Nigeria, he is the fourth child in a family of nine. He is married to Mrs. Bridget Larry-Izamoje and has three daughters, a son-in-law, and a grandson. .

== Early life ==
Izamoje attended the Institute of Continuing Education, Warri, before attending the University of Lagos from 1981 to 1984, graduating with a Bachelor of Science (second Class Upper Honours) degree in sociology. He did his National Youth Service Corps (NYSC) service in Kano State and was a recipient of the Kano State NYSC award for excellence. He was a member of the editorial board of the Kano State NYSC Newsletter during his 1984-85 service year. Izamoje returned to school to receive a Master of Science degree in sociology in 1986 from the University of Lagos and a doctorate degree in 2012 from the Business School, Lausanne, Switzerland.

== Early career ==
On returning to the University of Lagos in 1985 for his master's degree, Izamoje worked as a freelance reporter under Ernest Okonkwo at the Federal Radio Corporation of Nigeria (FRCN). From 1986 to 1990, Izamoje was in the employ of Concord Press, serving as a sports reporter, promotions executive, and deputy sports editor. He joined the now-defunct Mail newspaper as sports editor in late 1990 and worked briefly at DBN-TV Lagos before setting up Brila Sports, an independent production and sports consultancy company, with a second-hand table and chair and a second hand typewriter, in 1992.

== Brila FM ==
Izamoje founded Sports Radio 88.9 Brila FM and has remained the chairman of the company. Nigeria and Africa's first sports radio station went on the air in 2002. Izamoje opened his second station in Abuja, in January 2007. In 2011, Larry Izamoje hit another milestone when Sports Radio 88.9 Brila FM opened its Onitsha station.

The Port Harcourt station 101.1 Brila FM was launched in January 2022 as it continued its rapid expansion program

== Awards and organisations ==
In 2007, Izamoje was honoured by the University of Lagos Alumni Association for his contributions to Nigerian society through sports journalism.

Izamoje won the NYSC Merit Award for Kano State in 1985, the Sportswriter of the Year award (1995) from the Sports Writers Association of Nigeria (SWAN), the NUJ/UAC award for excellence in journalism in 1988, the Lagos Football Referees Society award for excellence in journalism in 2002, the Success Digest Male Entrepreneur of the Year award in 2002, the 21st Century award for achievement in pioneering sports radio in Nigeria (2003), the TeloComm Humanity award for service to the disabled in 2003 through 2006, the International Foundation for Excellence award for contribution to mankind and nation building (2003), and the Sports Writer of the Year award from Sporting Champion in 2004. He was an Olympic Torch bearer in Cairo in June 2004, when the Olympic Torch made its first visit to Africa since the inception of the modern Olympics. In April, 2005 he was named an alumni exhibition and seminar attendee by the American National Association of Broadcasters, Las Vegas.

Izamoje is a recipient of the 2005 Excellence Award of the national body of the Sportswriters Association of Nigeria (SWAN).

Izamoje was media committee member, LOC of Nigeria '99 World Youth Championship; Marketing Committee member, LOC of Africa Cup of Nations 2000; a member of the pro-league review committee in 2000; a member of the Task force for Super Eagles preparation for the 2000 Nations Cup; a member of the All-Africa Games logo selection committee in 2001; Chairman of the Nigerian Football Summit planning committee in 2002; and a member of the Event Analysis team, Abuja 2003.

Widely travelled, he was the only African journalist that covered the historic Marvin Hagler/Sugar Ray Leonard bout in Las Vegas in 1987, and with his wife the only Africans that attended the global Sports Radio Conference, San Diego in 2002. He was between 1999 and 2002 a regular attendee of the global Football Expo held yearly in Cannes.

He has covered the Nations cup, World Cup, Commonwealth Games and the Wimbledon tennis championships. Izamoje was a member of the 12-man Presidential Committee charged by the then Nigerian leader, President Umaru Yar'Adua, to ensure Nigeria's qualification for and participation in the South Africa 2010 World Cup.

Dr. Izamoje is a fellow of five top professional bodies, namely the Advertising Regulatory Council of Nigeria (ARCON), the Nigerian Institute of Public Relations (NIPR), the National Institute of Sports, Nigeria (NIS), the Nigerian Institute of Entrepreneurs (NIE) and the Nigerian Chartered Institute of Administrators and Researchers (CFIAR). He is a member of the Institute of Directors (IOD), Nigerian and International Sportswriters Associations (SWAN and AIPS), Independent Broadcasters Association of Nigeria (IBAN) and the Broadcasting Organisation of Nigeria (BON) amongst others. Brila FM is an affiliate of the Voice of America (VOA).

In 2012, Izamoje was awarded a Doctor of Business Administration (DBA) degree by the Business School Lausanne (BSL), Lausanne, Switzerland for academic work on Changing Work Values and Labour Mobility in Small & Medium Organizations in Lagos, Nigeria. He has an honorary D.Sc. degree from the Salem University, Lokoja in Nigeria, the reason he is jocularly called ‘Double Dr’ .
