= Femi D Amele =

Nigerian broadcaster, journalist, and writer

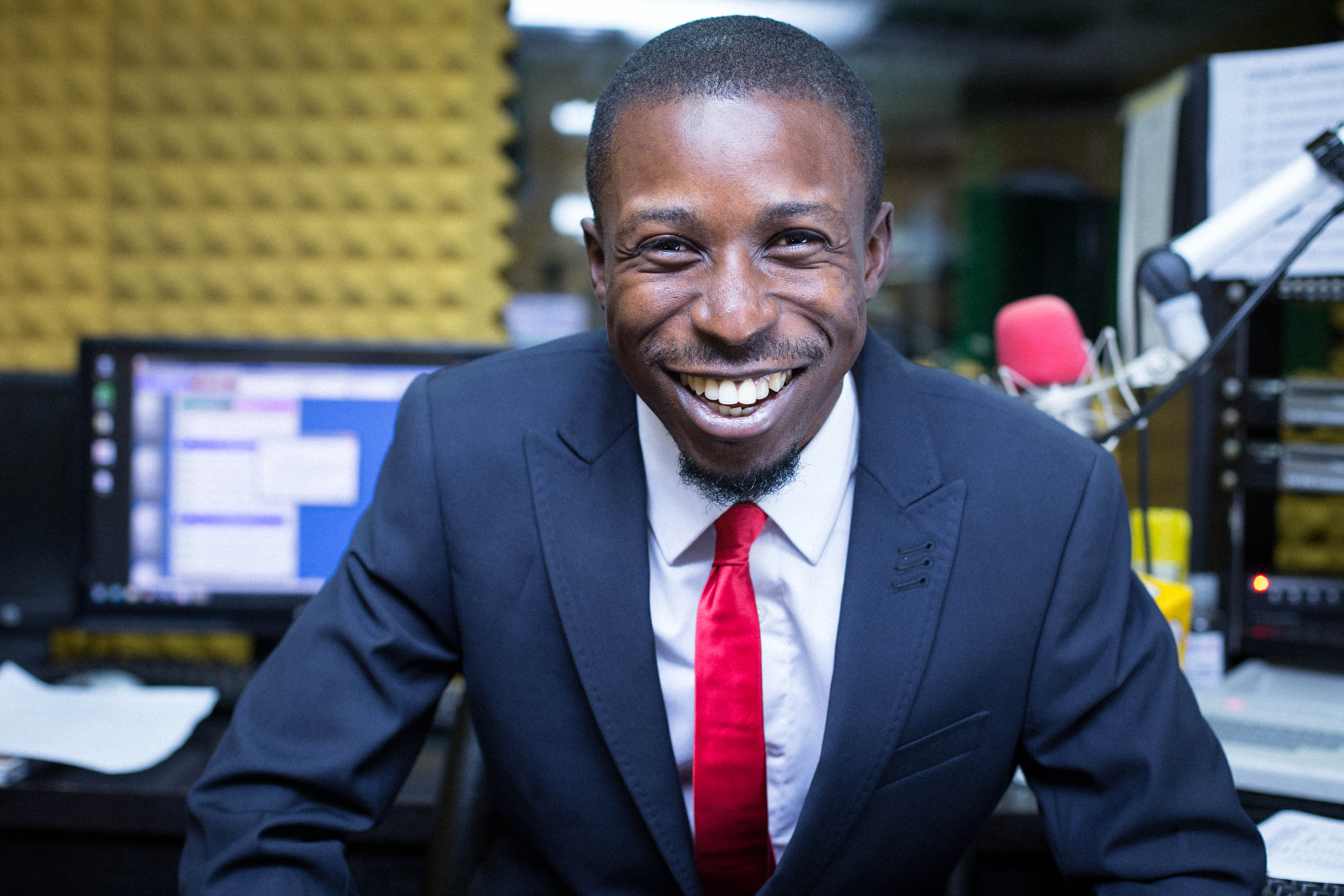
- Amele in 2015
- Born: November 14, 1983 (age 42); Nigeria
- Occupations: broadcaster and multimedia journalist.
- Awards: Nominated for Climate Change TV Award in 2010.Economic Power Award 2015. Guardian, Beacon of Literacy Award 2015.

Amele Adefemi Olubunmi D. (born 14 November 1983), more popularly known as Femi D, is a Nigerian Podcaster, Radio and TV broadcaster, talk show host, web series producer, and political journalist. Frequent topics of discussion on his shows include national policy development, macro-economics, governance, and international affairs. In 2020, he was listed among the top 100 media personalities of the year by YNaija.

== Biography ==
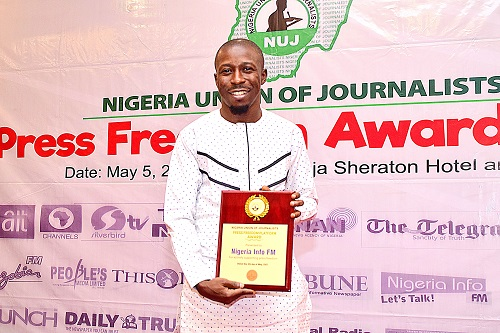
Femi Amele after receiving an award from Nigeria Union of Journalists

Amele was born 14 November 1983 in Nigeria and developed an interest in broadcasting at 14. He worked as a backup host for Nnamdi Azikiwe University's UNIZIK FM radio station on a show called International Affairs. His first talk show debuted in 2010 at a radio station in Awka and focused on both national and international politics through his own commentary and listener calls. The same year, he was awarded a UK grant to produce a documentary about climate change's effect on Lagos; his film was later nominated for the Climate Change TV Award. In 2011, he joined Cool FM Nigeria and the now-defunct magazine 234Next. While at Cool FM, he helped establish and develop Nigeria Info, now a network of talk radio stations. Amele has worked at 101.9 Jay FM, Nigeria Info, Amplified Radio, VibingBrands, FineRadioCO in a variety of positions, including programme director, CEO and board chairman. He has hosted regular shows such as Morning Crossfire with FemiDlive (2019), Nigeria Info and Let's Talk with Femi D (95.1 Abuja) as well as specials such as Ready to Run Radio ahead of the 2019 election. In 2025, he launched Volume Pod LLC is a (content platform) media-podcasting company specialising in analytical journalism and interactive storytelling through the production of podcasts, documentaries and shows.

Amele is also a founder of music and talk show app Vibing Live; Co-founder of FineRadioCO; an advisory board member for the iRead Nigeria Project; and has interviewed people such as Jerry Gana, Lai Mohammed, Audu Maikori, and 2Baba. He is the Co-founder/Managing Partner at FineRadioCO. In 2024 joined Dataphyte as Programmes Director, over-viewing operations and products development. Femi leads conversations at webinars. speaking engagements and conferences on Artificial Intelligence in Media Ecosystem and Technology.

In 2025, he launched The Volume Pod channel (Volume Pod LLC) a leading digital content creation and media marketing platform that enhances interactive debate through podcasts in Nigeria's news, talk, and storytelling experiences. On Volume Pods, Femi is the host of Volume with FemiDlive, Matters That Matter. On Volume with FemiDlive, he host current affairs and socioeconomic conversations that makes news headlines in national newspaper with leading figures such as Ibe Kachukwu, Dr. Sam Amadi, High Chief Peter Ameh, Mr. David Akoji, Director of Special Duties and Zonal Operations at the National Orientation Agency (NOA). On Matters That Matter series of Heinrich Böll Stiftung Nigeria, he leads in-depth conversations such as 'Judiciary Inconsistency in Elections'; Limits Around Women in Politics and Hidden risks in Nigeria’s fertiliser use.

In 2026, he was named host and producer of a thematic series on social development in localisation title "Like A Local" will release a 10 part conversations that covers Nigeria, Kenya and Senegal on the subject. The project is co-implemented by BudgIT Foundation, Connected Development (CODE) and Hilton Foundation

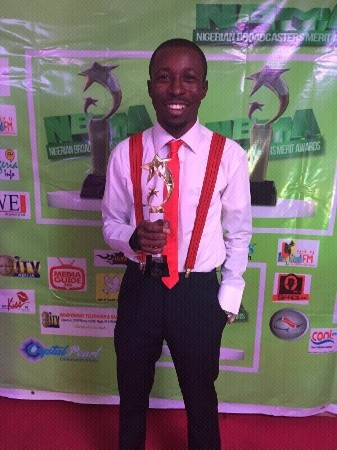
Amele with the award for the best On-Air Personality for an evening show from Nigeria Broadcasters Merit Awards, 2019

As a media expert, his insights into media, technology and business in Africa have appeared in leading national newspapers. He has also written People's Gazette Nigeria, and Vanguard and produced documentaries, including Anything For Us about government bribery and corruption in Nigeria (with the support of YIAGA Africa and the MacArthur Foundation and High and Dry about drug abuse. Amele is also a winner of Nigeria Health Watch and recipients of the 2nd #PreventEpidemicsNaija Journalism Fellowship.

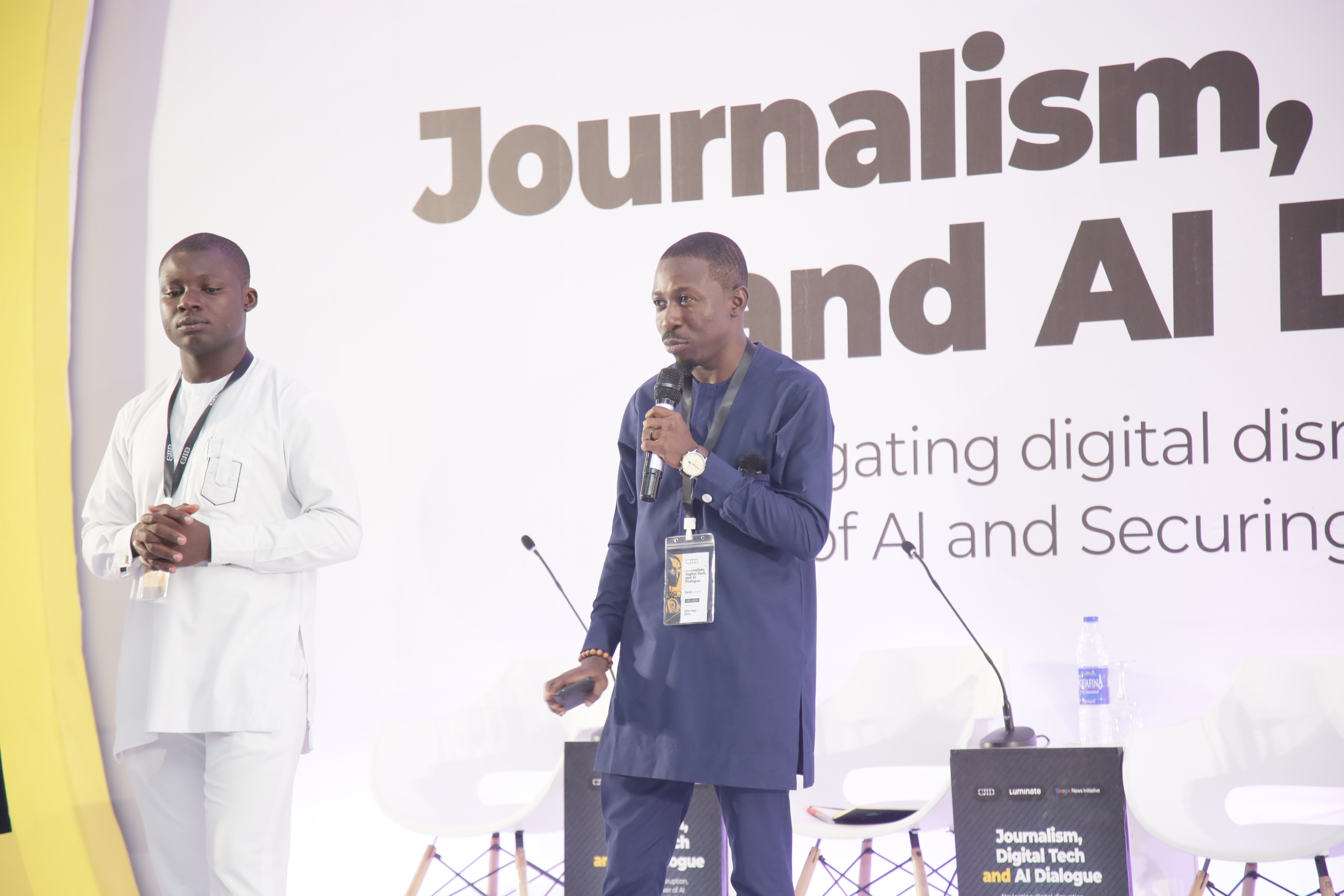
Femi Amele speaking on Media AI Tool, Nubia AI at the CJID Conference on AI in the Media

In 2019, he was awarded an honorary doctorate from Youth Education and Leadership Initiative in Conflict Management and Development, and holds a certificate from the International Business Management Institute in Strategic Management; a certificate in global diplomacy from University of London; and a certificate in operation management strategy from the Metropolitan School Of Business Management in the UK. In 2020, he was named a Fellow by Nigeria Health Watch. He resides in Abuja.

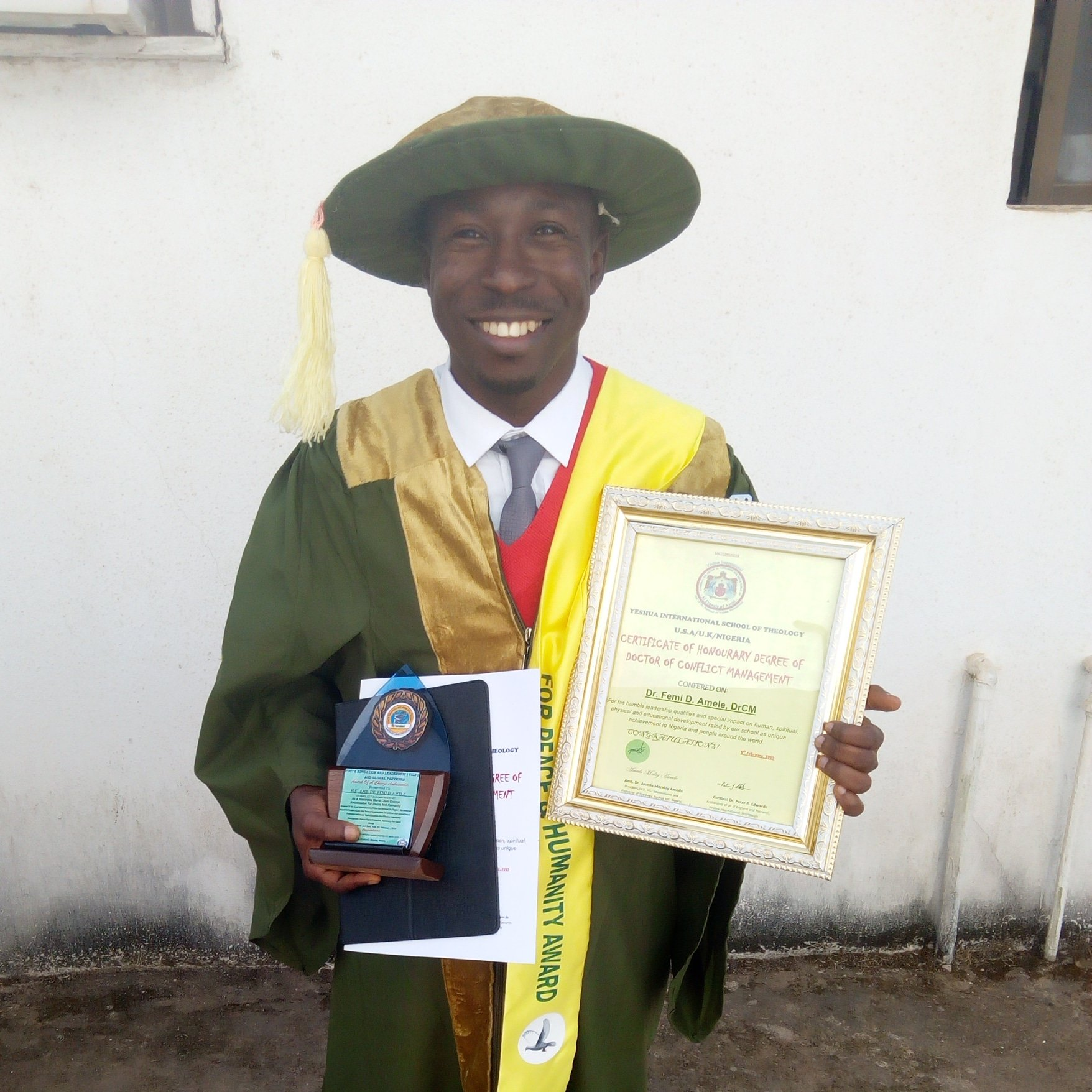
Amele shortly after receiving an Honorary Doctorate Award on Conflict Management

=== Election activism ===
Amele was an active member of the #NotTooYoungToRun movement, which advocated for a bill to lower the age eligibility requirements for Nigerian elected officials. He wrote and narrated the documentary Young Lawmakers Credit 'Not Too Young To Run' Law For Their Emergence in collaboration with YIAGA Africa; made Facing Vote Buying in Elections ahead of the 2019 election; and made How Young People Fared in Contesting in 2019 Elections, which aired on Channels TV. With the support of YIAGA Africa and the European Union, he co-hosted Ready to Run Radio on Nigeria Info, also before the 2019 election. He has also done voiceover work for the Independent National Electoral Commission.

== Recognition & Association ==
- Nominee, TV Presenter of Year (The Nigeria Broadcasting Awards)
- Member, Society of Nigeria Broadcasters
- Member, Nigeria Union of Journalists
- Winner, Basic Education Media Fellowship 2022
- Finalist, Sports Presenter of the Year (Nigeria Radio Awards, 2011)
- Winner, Personality of the Year (Bayero University, 2012)
- Nominee, Presenter of the Year (Sports Writers Association of Nigeria, 2014)
- Winner, Best Director (HD Film Academy Script to Screen Awards, 2014)
- Winner, Beacon of Literacy Award (iRead Nigeria Project, 2015)
- Winner, Economic Power Award (2015)
- Winner, National Dream Personality Award (Ministry Of Youth and Sports and Nigeria Rebirth, 2016)
- Winner, Best On-Air Personality (Nigeria Broadcasters Merit Award, 2016)
- Finalist, Best On-Air Personality (Who Is Who Awards, 2017)
- Ambassador for Change and Advocacy of Human Rights (Enhancing Communities Action for Peace and Better Health, 2018)
- Honourable World Class Change Ambassador for Peace and Humanity
- Honorary member and ambassador of Youth Education and Leadership Initiative
