= Udeze =

Udeze is a surname. Notable people with the surname include:

- Ifeanyi Udeze (born 1980), Nigerian footballer
- Kenechi Udeze (born 1983), American football player and coach
