= Peace FM 102.5 Maiduguri =

Peace FM Maiduguri
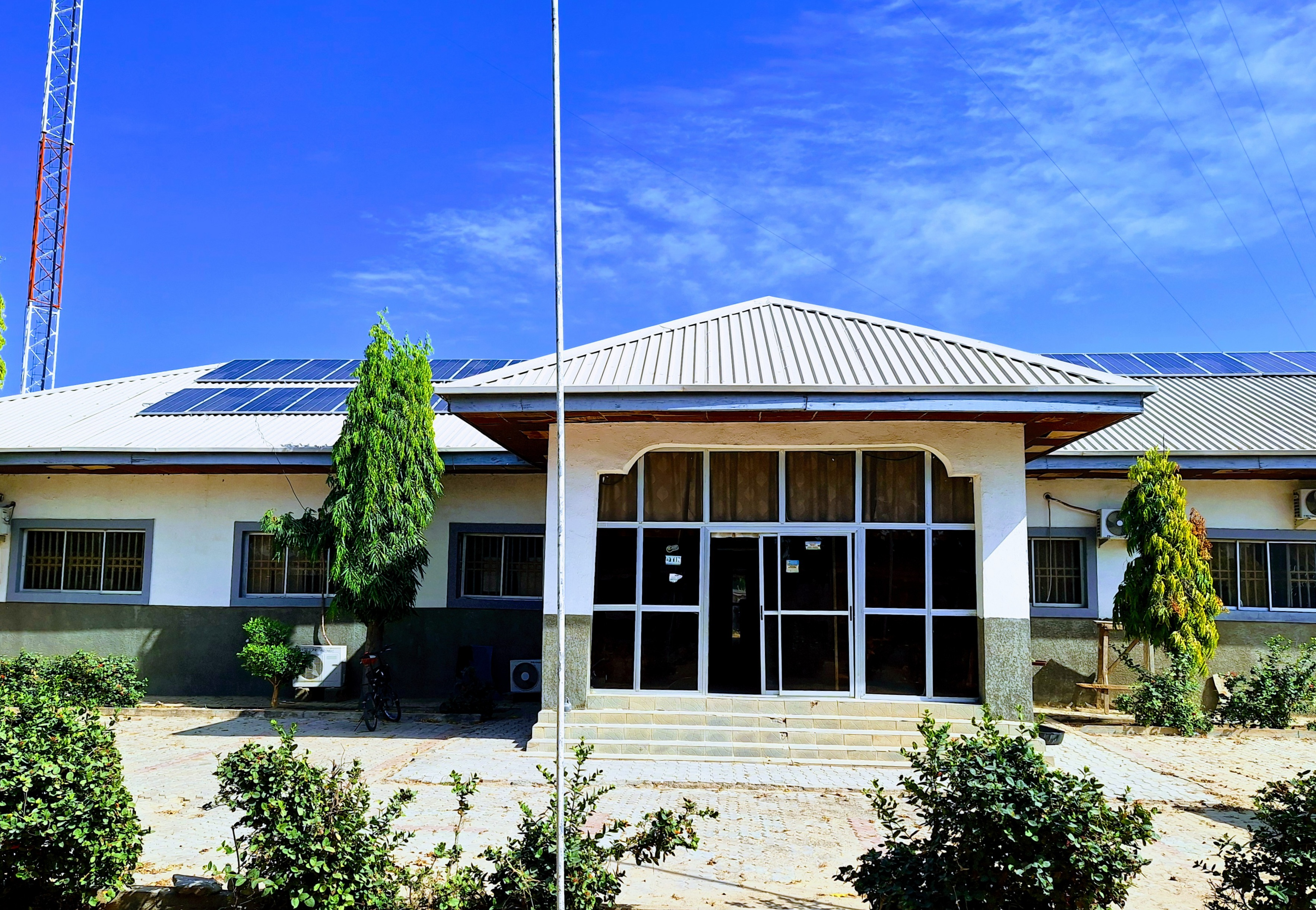
- Maiduguri; Nigeria
- Broadcast area: Borno State and surrounding areas
- Frequency: 102.5 MHz
- Branding: Peace FM 102.5

Programming
- Languages: English, Hausa
- Format: Public broadcasting

Ownership
- Owner: Federal Radio Corporation of Nigeria
- Operator: Federal Radio Corporation of Nigeria

Technical information
- Licensing authority: National Broadcasting Commission

Peace FM 102.5 Maiduguri is a public radio station in Maiduguri, the state capital of Borno, Nigeria. Nigeria's federal public broadcaster, It is owned and operated by the Federal Radio Corporation of Nigeria (FRCN),

== History ==
Peace FM Maiduguri was established in 2000 as part of the Federal Radio Corporation of Nigeria's network of regional FM stations aimed at expanding access to information and public service broadcasting across Nigeria. It began transmission in the early 2000s.

== See also ==
- List of radio stations in Nigeria
- Federal Radio Corporation of Nigeria
