= Etim Esin =

Nigerian footballer

Personal information
- Full name: Etim Esin John
- Date of birth: 5 November 1966 (age 59)
- Place of birth: Oron, Nigeria
- Position: Attacking midfielder

Youth career
- Oron United

Senior career*
Years	Team	Apps	(Gls)
- Iwuanyanwu Nationale
- Flash Flamingoes
- Calabar Rovers
- AA Gent
1988–1990	Lokeren	70	(13)
1991–1992	Lierse SK	30	(4)
- Kayserispor
- Eagle Cement

International career
- Nigeria
- * Club domestic league appearances and goals

Etim Esin John (born 5 October 1966) is a retired Nigerian international footballer. He is one of the most gifted players in Nigeria’s football history.

Esin played for Iwuanyanwu Nationale, Flash Flamingoes, and Calabar Rovers before moving to Belgium.

He was nicknamed "Maradona", by legendary Nigerian radio commentator Ernest Okonkwo.

== International career ==
He has represented his country at the 1987 FIFA World Youth Championship and in 6 FIFA World Cup qualification matches. He was left out of the team that represented Nigeria at the 1994 world cup due to the fact that there was a report that he was banned by FIFA for allegedly raping a minor during his playing days with Lierse fc, a claim that was later proven to be false 25 years later.
