= Radio Benue =

Radio station

- Makurdi; Nigeria
- Broadcast area: Benue State
- Frequency: 95.0 MHz

Programming
- Languages: Mixed Tiv, Idoma and English language

Ownership
- Owner: Radio Benue Corporation Makurdi

Technical information
- Transmitter coordinates: 8.556054°N 7.688765°E

Links
- Website: radiobenue.com

Radio Benue 95.0 FM is a public radio station in Makurdi, the capital of Benue State, Nigeria. Established by the Benue State government in 1978, the station aims to inform, educate, and entertain the local population.

== History ==
Radio Benue was founded under Edict No. 14 of 1978, which came into effect on April 1, 1978. Since its inception, the station has faced various operational challenges while striving to serve the community.

The appointment of Terseer Mzuulga as managing director of Radio Benue has been authorized by Benue State Governor, Hyacinth Alia.

Radio Benue broadcasts diverse programs, including news, talk shows, music, and cultural content. The station primarily broadcasts in English and several local languages, including Tiv and Idoma, to cater to its diverse audience.

== See also ==
- List of radio stations in Nigeria
- Nigerian Broadcasting Corporation
