= Sunshine FM Potiskum =

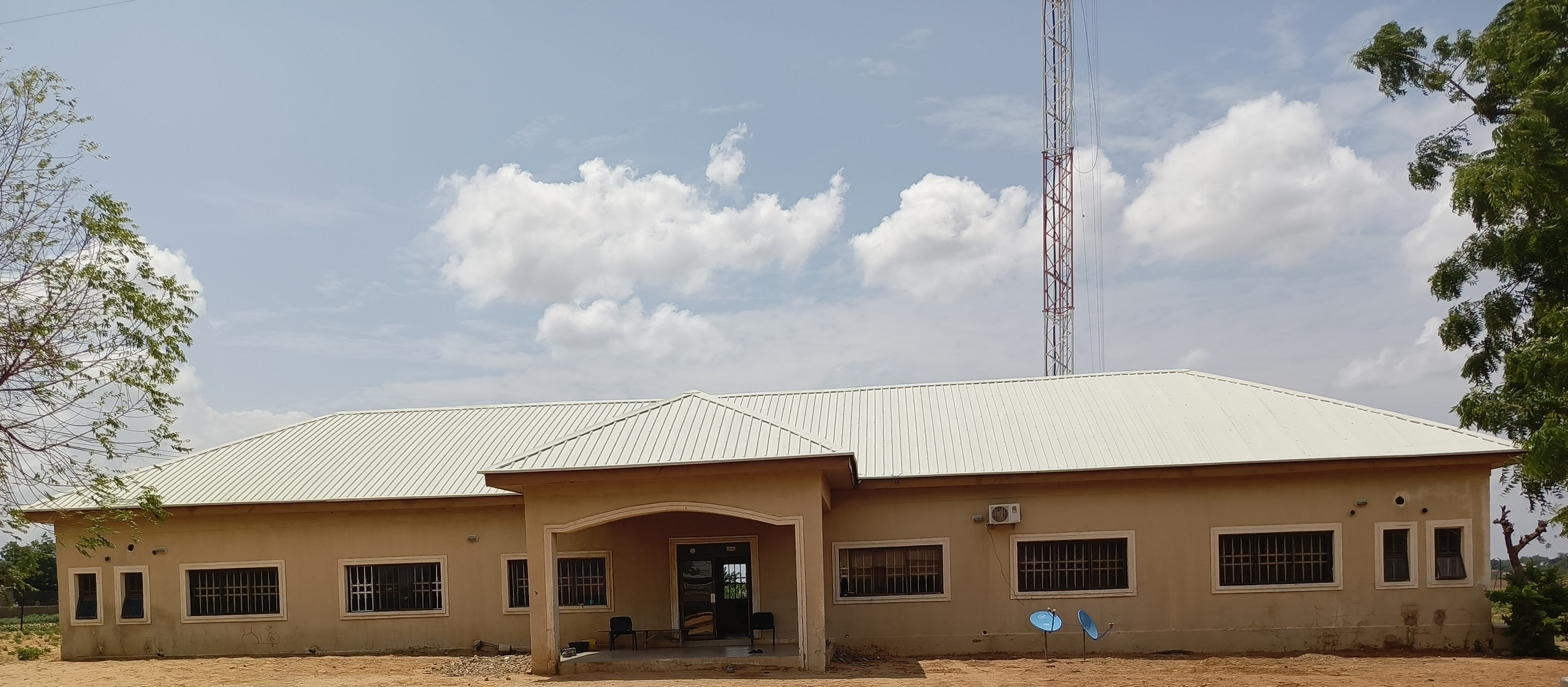
- Studio facility
- Potiskum; Nigeria
- Frequency: 104.5 MHz

Programming
- Languages: English, Hausa, Kanuri, Kare kare

Ownership
- Owner: Federal Radio Corporation of Nigeria

History
- First air date: 2 March 2018
- Former frequencies: 88.1 MHz

Links
- Website: sunshinefmng.com

Sunshine FM Potiskum (104.5 MHz) is a radio station in Potiskum, Yobe State, Nigeria. It broadcasts news, entertainment, and educational programming in English, Hausa and other local languages.

While the station was intended to launch in 2014, this was not possible due to a lack of funds; a non-governmental organisation, North-East Regional Initiative, paid for most construction costs. When it did launch in 2018, it was on low power on 88.1 MHz with only a nine-bay antenna instead of the intended 12. It was the second radio station built in Yobe State, with a station already on the air at Damaturu.
