= Adenike Oyetunde =

Nigerian founder of amputees united

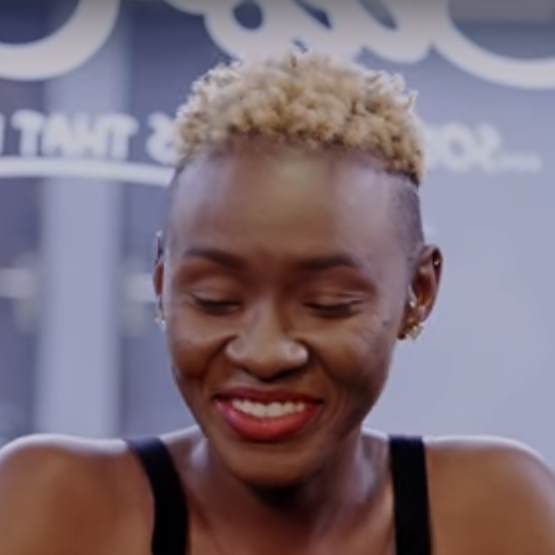
- Adenike Oyetunde in an interview at NdaniTV in 2017
- Born: March 5, 1986 (age 40)
- Education: Nigerian Law School
- Alma mater: Olabisi Onabanjo University
- Occupations: Media personality, Radio host, Author and Gratitude Coach
- Years active: 2010-present
- Known for: Media, social media influencing, life coaching, book reading and amputee advocate
- Spouse: Sherif Lawal (m. 2020)

Adenike Dasola Oyetunde-Lawal, professionally known as Adenike Oyetunde (born March 5, 1986) is a Nigerian media personality, radio host, author, lawyer, social media influencer and life coach. She is the founder of Amputees United Initiative and The Gratitude Hub. In 2021, she was appointed by the Lagos State Governor, Babajide Sanwo-Olu, as the senior special assistant on persons living with disability.

== Early life ==
Adenike was born in 1986 to homemaker Bukola Victoria Oyetunde and public servant Adelani Olarere Oyetunde. She had her primary school education from Command Children school and her secondary education at Queen's college, Lagos. Adenike obtained a degree in Law from Olabisi Onabanjo University. While at the University, after a slip and fall accident, Adenike was diagnosed with bone cancer. After several treatment options were explored, doctors eventually advised that she would need to have her leg amputated in order to save her life. At the age of 20, her right leg was amputated. After graduating from University, she attended the Nigerian Law School, graduating with a 2nd class upper degree in 2010 and was called to the Nigerian Bar.

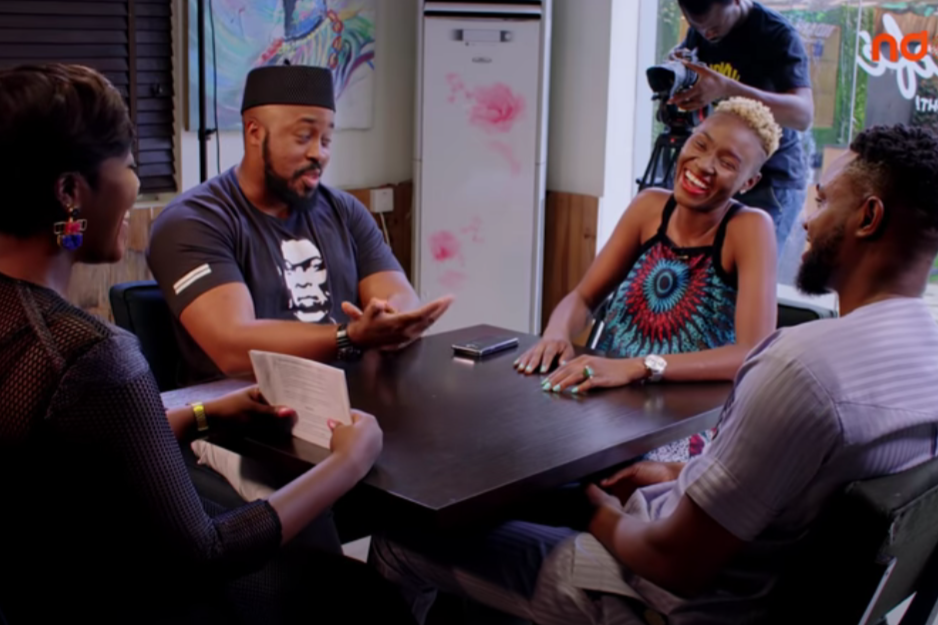
Oyetune on NdaniTV's Real Talk hosted by Nicole Asinugo (left)

== Career ==
Adenike obtained a part-time job as a broadcaster, with 99.3 Nigeria Info FM, which was eventually expanded to a full time role. In no time, Adenike began hosting a five-hour weekday show, where she discussed a wide range of subjects from politics to lifestyle. Oyetunde offered free legal council on the radio, although she was not practicing law at the time. Adenike is also a regular contributor on Smooth 98.1 FM's news commentary show, Freshly Ground.

Adenike founded the Amputees United Initiative on which platform, she advocates for the rights of amputees and other persons living with disability. She also does volunteer work with Irede Foundation, a non-government organization that works with children, who have suffered limb loss, providing them with prosthetic limbs up till they are 18 years old.

In 2017 she gave a talk about Philanthropy and the Role of Empathy in the Human Society at TedX Gbagada in Lagos.

In 2018, Adenike wrote and published her self-titled autobiography, Adénìké. The book has enjoyed rave reviews, with Business Day's Titilade Oyemade, espousing its inspirational content and concluding "You will feel inspiration wash over you as you read this book, filled with hope you can use to overcome challenges and achieve fulfillment in your life."

In January 2021, the Lagos state government announced that the governor, Babajide Sanwo-Olu had confirmed the appointment of Adenike as the Senior Special Assistant on Persons Living with Disabilities (PLWDs) in recognition of her work as a Programme Manager, Ambassador, Volunteer and Fundraiser on Irede Foundation’s Amputees United Initiative since 2018.

== Personal life ==
On December 5, 2020, Adenike married her longtime boyfriend and fellow broadcast journalist, Sherif Lawal in an intimate ceremony in Lagos.
