= Brila FM =

Radio station at Nigeria

Brila Media
- Lagos, Abuja, Onitsha; Nigeria
- Frequencies: 88.9 MHz (Lagos, Abuja, Onitsha); 101.1 MHz (Port Harcourt)
- Branding: Brila Media

Programming
- Languages: English, Nigerian Pidgin
- Format: Urban contemporary

Ownership
- Owner: Larry Izamoje

History
- First air date: 1 October 2002; 24 years ago

Technical information
- Licensing authority: NBC

Links
- Webcast: https://brila.net/
- Website: brila.net

Brila FM now known as Brila Media is a Nigerian sports media organization headquartered in Lagos, Nigeria. Originally founded as Nigeria's first and only 24/7 sports radio station on 1 October 2002, by Dr Larry Izamoje , the company expanded into a multi-platform media group in 2017. The station is now part of the Brila Media Group, a Nigeria sports media organization that has expanded from radio broadcasting into digital media, sports consulting,Data Collection, events, print and sports partnerships. Brila FM is a niche station and focused majorly on sports news, live commentary, analysis and discussion.

Brila FM has three stations, in Lagos, Abuja, Onitsha; it previously also broadcast in Kaduna and Port Harcourt .

The group operates Sports Radio 88.9 Brila FM (Lagos, Abuja, Onitsha), digital platforms http://brila.net and http://footballlive.ng, the Brila App (audio-visual streaming), and Brila Media digital channels @brilamedia on Instagram, TikTok, YouTube, Facebook and X. As of October 2026, Brila Media has over 1.5million followers on Facebook, 180,000 followers on Instagram, over 106,000 followers on TikTok with 2.2 million likes, and maintains one of Nigeria's largest sports YouTube and Facebook communities.

== History ==
Brila Media was founded in 2002 by Nigerian broadcaster and sports journalist Larry Izamoje. The organisation began as Brila FM, a sports-focused radio station, and developed its programming around sports news, live commentary, analysis and discussion.

Brila has over time expanded its activities and developed a presence in other Nigerian markets. It is known for pioneering sports broadcast partners into the Nigerian market; popular ones bieng its 2012 and 2014 talkSPORT live broadcast partnership, Laliga in 2017 and much more.

Over the years, Brila FM has been the home of Nigerian football information. With the Brila Fm as the official media partner of the Nigeria Football Federation. The station is the go to for AFCON coverage, WAFCON, Worldcup and much more.

Through its radio and digital platforms, Brila has provided coverage of the Nigeria national teams and Nigerian football, including reporting, interviews, analysis and discussion around major football competitions and developments.

The organisation has also provided a platform for former Nigerian international players, coaches and football administrators to discuss the national teams, domestic football and developments within the Nigerian game.

== Contribution To Nigerian Sports Broadcasting ==
Brila has been associated with the development of specialist sports broadcasting in Nigeria since its establishment in 2002.

Its programming has provided a platform for sports journalists, athletes, former international players, coaches, administrators and other figures in Nigerian and international sport.

Former Nigerian football internationals who have appeared priemered as analysts, presenters or contributors on Brila's platforms have included Ifeanyi Udeze, Daniel Amokachi and the late Peter Rufai, among others.

The organisation has also hosted and interviewed prominent international football figures visiting Nigeria. International football personalities who have appeared on Brila's platforms have included Rio Ferdinand and Roberto Di Matteo.

Brila's coverage has extended beyond football to other sports and sporting events in Nigeria, including the Access Bank Lagos City Marathon.

== Digital Transformation ==
In 2017, Brila expanded from a primarily radio-based sports broadcaster into a multi-platform sports media organisation.

Its digital operations include online sports journalism, video, social media, live digital coverage and other forms of audiovisual content.

The expansion led to the broader use of the Brila Media identity, while Brila FM continued as the organisation's radio broadcasting brand.

== Sports Business and Consulting ==
Brila Media has expanded its activities into sports business, sports marketing and research.

In 2026, the organisation launched the Brila Sports Marketing Intelligence Report, examining sports consumption, fan behaviour and sports marketing in Nigeria. A pioneer sports marketing report in Nigeria and the first of its kind in the marketing industry.

The report uses survey data and analysis to examine subjects including sports fandom, match-day behaviour, consumer participation and the relationship between sports audiences and brands. Other reports include a world cup report in 2026.

== Leadership ==
Dr Larry Izamoje is the founder of Brila Media. He established Brila FM in 2002 and developed the organisation as a specialist sports broadcasting business until Debbie’s leadership transcended it beyond radio.

Izamoje is a Nigerian broadcaster and sports journalist who has been associated with sports broadcasting and journalism in Nigeria for several decades and has shaped the culture of the industry. He is known as one of the piooners of sports broadcasting in Nigeria.

=== Debbie Izamoje Okolie ===
Debbie Izamoje Okolie, formerly known as Debbie Larry-Izamoje, is the Chief Executive Officer of Brila Media and a second-generation leader of the organisation. She joined Brila in 2017 and has led its transformation from a traditional sports radio broadcaster into a multi-platform sports media company spanning radio, digital media, audiovisual content, events, research and sports business.

Beyond Brila, Debbie has worked across the wider Nigerian sports ecosystem, including women's football and esports. She served as a digital communications strategist for the Nigeria Women Football League, contributing to the league's identity and digital rebrand, and has also worked with the Esports Federation of Nigeria.

She is the founder and convener of Football for Girls Africa (FGA), an initiative focused on creating pathways for girls and young women across football, including careers in media, management, administration and other areas beyond playing. The initiative launched in partnership with the Nigeria Football Federation and had reached 3,000 girls.

Debbie has represented Nigeria's sports-media industry at international platforms including the World Football Summit, where she has contributed to discussions around women's football, digital media and the commercial development of sport.

Her recognitions include The Future Awards Africa for Intrapreneurship, Brand Communicator's 35 Under 35, Top 100 Powerful Women, and the FNIMN designation from the National Institute of Marketing of Nigeria, making her the youngest woman in sports to hold it.

Education: Debbie holds a BSc in Information Management from the University of Sheffield and an MSc in Management from University College London (UCL), with further executive education in Innovation and Strategy at Harvard University, User Innovation at MIT, Sports Business Management at Lagos Business School, and Digital Media and Sports Communications at the Barcelona Sports Institute.

== Notable presenters and pundits ==
- Ifeanyi Udeze
- Anthony Bekederemo

== Awards and recognition ==
The organisation and its representatives have been recognised by organisations including Sportsville, PwC, Lagos Business School, NSAUK and BusinessDay for contributions to sports broadcasting, media and business.

== Controversies and Legal Proceedings ==
In 2025, three former employees of Brila Broadcasting Services (Babafemi Raji, Blessing Ekerete and Victor Akpan) were charged in a Federal High Court in Lagos in connection with an alleged ₦100 million fraud and money-laundering case.They had over the years formed a cartel and were stealing from the organization, causing it to close down 2 branches temporarily. Babafemi Raji was also charged for social media bullying against Dr Larry Izamoje. In November 2025, the court ordered proceedings to continue in the absence of the defendants after one of them, failed to appear for arraignment.

== See also ==
- List of radio stations in Nigeria
