= Buzz FM Aba =

Nigerian radio station

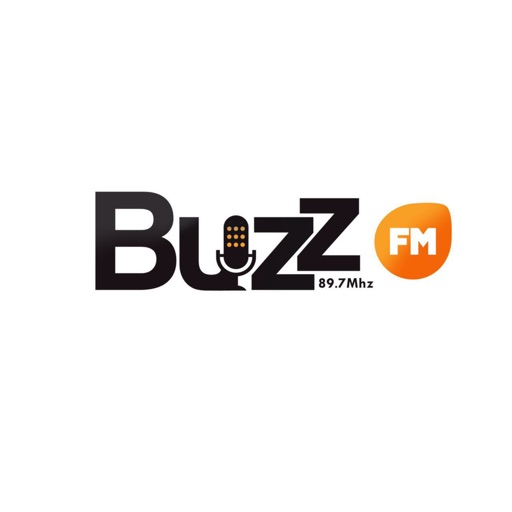

Aba, Abia State; Nigeria
- Frequency: 89.7 MHz

History
- First air date: 1 January 2019

Links
- Website: buzzfm897.com

Buzz FM Aba is a radio station based in Aba, the commercial city of Abia State, Nigeria. Established on 1 January 2019, the broadcaster transmits programs daily on 89.7 FM.

== See also ==
- Magic FM Aba
