= Shine Begho =

Nigerian radio personality

- Born: Shine Begho Usanga; 15 September 1985 (age 41); Delta State, Nigeria
- Occupations: Television show host, television and radio personality
- Writing career
- Period: 1985–present

Shine Begho Usanga (born 15 September 1985) is a Nigerian radio personality, television host, producer, promoter, brand ambassador and a businesswoman.

Begho hosts events including The Twists With Shine and Shine with The Stars, as well as being the former breakfast show co-host on 96.9 Cool FM Lagos for 5 years.

Begho is the former radio host of The Sunday Chilloutzone Show, The Twist With Shine Radio Show, a weekend radio show on COOL-FM Lagos. In 2017, Shine moved to 102.3 Max FM Lagos hosting the evening drive time show and in 2019 became the host of the midday show 'The Maxhits'.

== Life and work ==
=== Early life and education ===
Begho was born in Delta State, Nigeria, and did her elementary education in Sapele Delta State High School in Benin City, Edo State and College in Anambra State.[5] She is the daughter of late Chief Justice Begho, a Chief justice of then Bendel State, and Ester Begho, a businesswoman.

Begho studied Mass communication (journalism) at Madonna University, Okija 2002. While in college, she was a dancer and model. Begho graduated in 2007 and moved back home to Lagos permanently to pursue her broadcasting career.[8]

== Professional background ==
=== Television hosting ===
In 2007, Begho got a job as a television presenter with Galaxy Television. She also hosted a kids' TV show, and was featured on various television programmes and reality shows.

=== Radio hosting ===
In January 2008, Begho became a co-host of the Eko FM radio program Thank God It's Friday. The show aired every Friday afternoon; Shine Begho would finish her TV and rush to the radio station to join the other hosts. In April 2008, she went for her national youth service corp and was a major radio presenter in camp. In 2009, Begho became one of the new radio presenters With HOT FM Abuja, co-hosting the evening drive time show.

In December 2009, Begho moved back to Lagos and had a short stint with Classic FM radio. In 2010, she moved to start up a new radio station 105.1 CITY FM as a pioneer presenter alongside other presenters; she co-hosted the breakfast show and hosted the weekend show.

In January 2011, Begho moved to Rainbow FM, hosting the breakfast show and later on moved her time belt to the evening drive time show and later on the afternoon drive time belt. Still in 2011, Begho joined an internet radio called Zoodrums Radio for two months and then moved to 96.9 COOL FM Lagos, where she co-hosted the breakfast show and hosts her own show over the weekend, The Sunday Chilloutzone Show and The Twist with Shine Radio Show.

In October 2017, Shine Begho joined a new radio station 102.3 Maxfm lagos, first it was just the weekend and then, in January 2018, she became the host of the evening drive time show (Max Drive) every weekday, and in January 2019, became the new host for the Maxhits.

== Accolades ==
- Global Media brand Ambassador for Globally Igniting Africa Organization
- Ambassador Arkbridge Integrated (Real estate)
- Host: Kennis music Easter Fiesta
- Presenter Mystery shopper Promo
- Radio Host: The Good morning Nigeria Show, 5 am – 10, weekdays. The Sunday Chilloutzone Show Sundays 1 pm – 7 pm and The Twist With Shine Radio Show 4–5 pm Sundays on 96.9 Coolfm FM Lagos
- Radio Host: Max hits 10am – 2pm weekdays on 102.3 Max Fm Lagos
- Radio Host: Chelsea spirit of success party radio show, syndicated radio show
- Nominee: Nigeria Merit broadcasters Awards (sexiest OAP 2012) and Female OAP of the Year 2012
- Audition Judge: Miss Tourism 2014
- Audition Judge: Mr Universe 2014
- Host : Miss Tourism 2014
- Host: Mr Universe 2014
- Radio Personality of the Year: Dynamix All Youth Awards 2012
- Radio Presenter of the year : Nira Awards 2012
- Radio Personality of the year : scream awards 2014
- Breakfast show presenter of the year : Nigeria Merit Broadcasters Awards 2014
- Star Crusader: 1 million gift of literacy 2015
- Nominee: ELOY Awards 2018 Radio host of the year
