= Globe FM =

Radio station in Nigeria

- Bauchi; Nigeria
- Broadcast area: Bauchi State
- Frequency: 98.5 MHz

Ownership
- Owner: Federal Radio Corporation of Nigeria

History
- First air date: July 29, 2003

Links
- Website: globefmbauchi.com

Globe FM (98.5 MHz) is a radio station located in Bauchi State, Nigeria. It is part of the Federal Radio Corporation of Nigeria national state-owned network. It launched on 29 July 2003 as part of a 36-station expansion of the FRCN network.

In 2021, new 10 kW transmitters were installed at Globe FM and 11 other FRCN stations.

The current General Manager of the station is Malam Alkasim Bala who was prior to his recent deployment served as General Manager Gift FM Jalingo in Taraba State.
