= Yinka Ayefele =

Nigerian musician (born 1968)

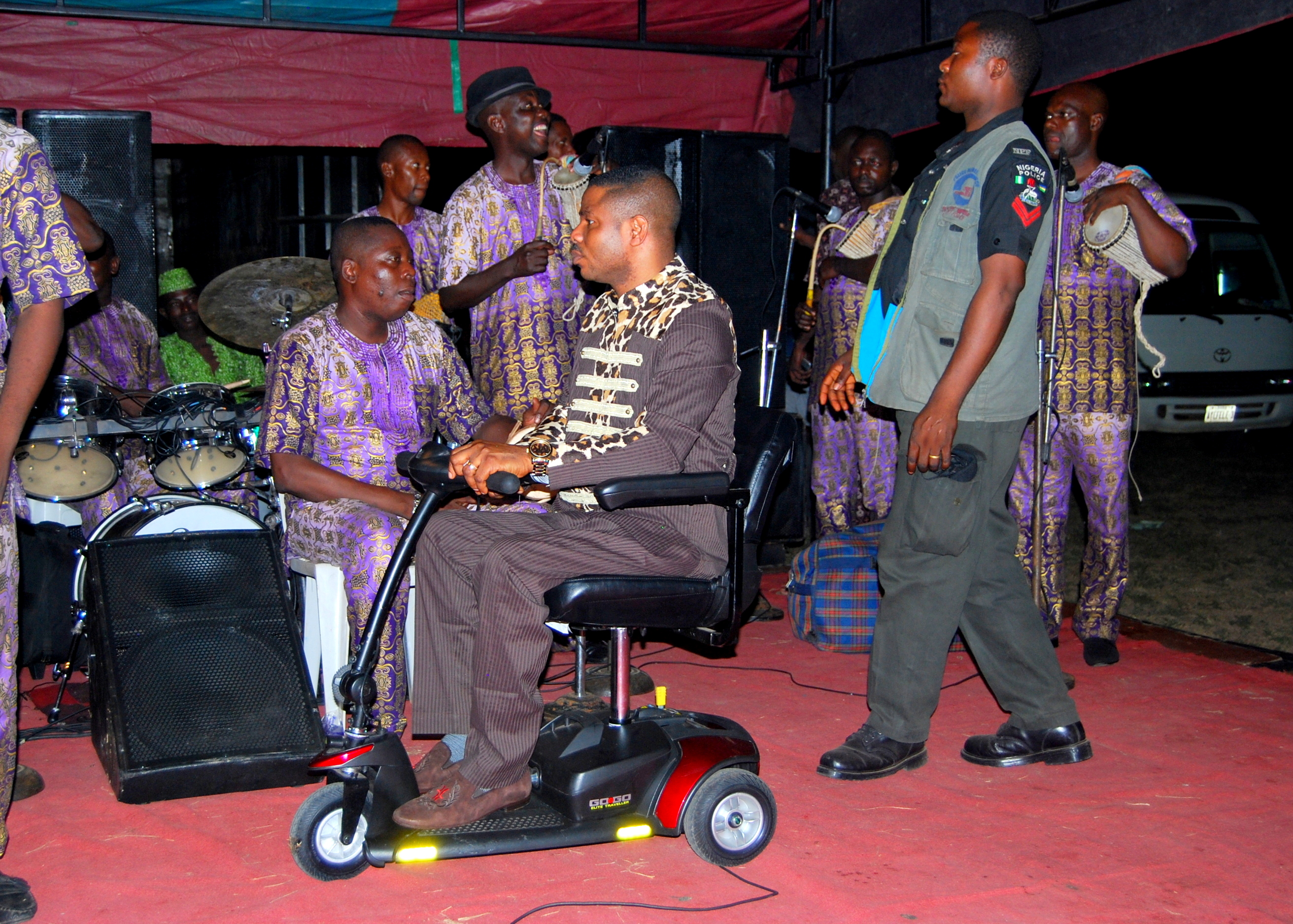
- Born: Olayinka Joel Ayefele; 1 February 1968 (age 58); Ipoti-Ekiti, Nigeria
- Occupation: Musician
- Years active: 1998–present
- Spouse: Temitope Titilope
- Children: 3
- Website: yinkaayefelemusic.com

Olayinka Joel Ayefele MON is a Nigerian music producer, gospel singer, radio presenter, and founder of Fresh and Blast FM network of radio stations across south-western Nigeria.

== Early life ==
Ayefele was born in Ipoti-Ekiti, a town in Ekiti State in southwestern Nigeria to the family of Joshua Taiwo Ayefele

== Education ==
He attended Our Saviours Anglican Primary School in Ipoti-Ekiti for his primary and secondary education before he later proceeded to Ondo State College of Arts and Science in Ikare Akoko, Ondo State, Nigeria.

== Career ==
Ayefele worked briefly as journalist and broadcaster at the Federal Radio Corporation of Nigeria, Ibadan, where he also produced jingles and musical works on radio. He began his music career in 1997 after he was involved in an automobile accident which damaged his spinal cord and made him reliant on a wheelchair. While in the hospital where he spent about 9 months, his friend, Kola Olootu, visited and advised him to put some songs together. This suggestion resulted in the release of his debut album titled, Bitter Experience in 1998 which brought him into limelight. The release of Bitter Experience was followed by the release of Sweet Experience. Other albums released by the gospel musician are Something Else, Divine Intervention and Life after death, released in honor of Gbenga Adeboye, a Nigerian radio presenter, musician and comedian. The title Bitter Experience reflected his ordeal and Sweet Experience was the sweetness after a "Bitter Experience". Ayefele's music has been published by different outfits, including API Music (Alloy Production International) 1998 - 2009, Galaxy Music (2008–2018), and Role Model Entertainment (2019).

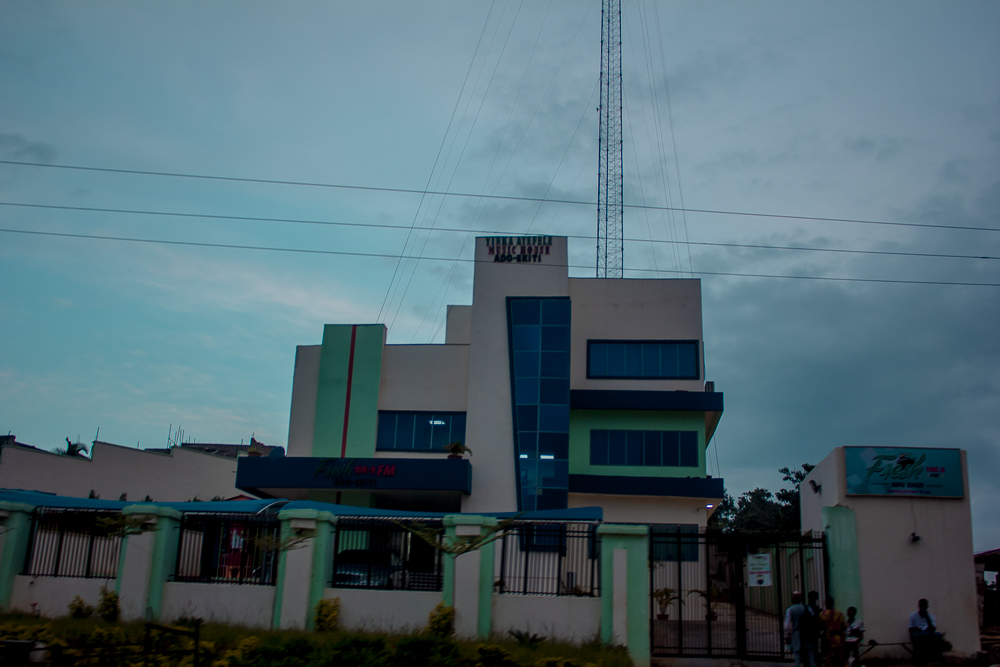
Yinka Ayefele music house ado ekiti

== Awards and honours ==
Ayefele has received over 200 awards. Among other awards are:

- Member of the Order of the Niger awarded by Goodluck Ebele Jonathan, the president of the Federal Republic of Nigeria (2011)
- Ekiti cultural ambassador award

== Radio station ==
Yinka Ayefele owns a network of radio stations across southwestern Nigeria called Fresh FM. The Ibadan arm of the network was established in 2015 and licensed by the Nigerian National Broadcasting Commission on 30 April 2015. Other arms of Ayefele's radio stations have, at different times since then, been opened in Abeokuta, Ado Ekiti, Akure, Osogbo and Lagos.

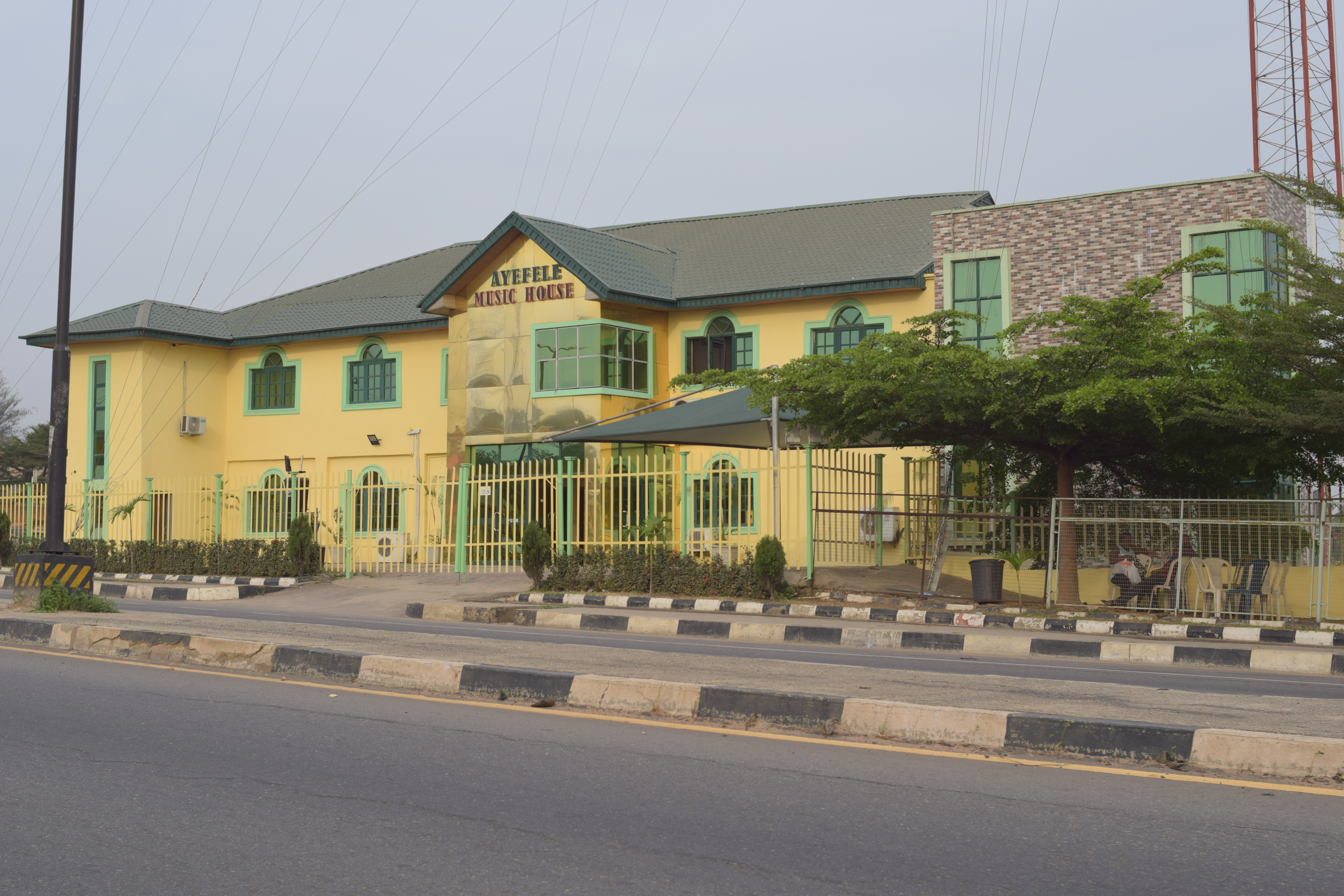
Ayefele's Music House, Challenge Ibadan

Ayefele's Music House, which also houses the Fresh FM radio station and a studio, was on 19 August 2018 demolished by the Oyo State Government. The reason the government gave for the demolition was that the property's location contravened the stipulations by the town planning authority. This sparked outrage from fans and sympathizers.

== Personal life ==
Yinka Ayefele is married to Temitope Titilope Ayefele and the union is blessed with four children,a triplet born on the 18th January 2019 and the fourth child was born in October 2024.

== Controversies ==
In February 2026, folk singer Beautiful Nubia (Segun Akinlolu) accused Ayefele of unauthorized use of his 1997 song "Seven Lifes." The dispute centers on Ayefele's 2012 track "My Faith in God (Igbagbo Ireti)," which Beautiful Nubia claimed appropriated core melodies from his original work without permission or licensing. Ayefele has previously discussed his views on melodic borrowing during interviews on Fresh FM, suggesting a more fluid approach to the use of existing tunes in the gospel genre. As of late February 2026, no official rebuttal had been issued regarding these specific allegations.

== Discography ==
- Bitter Experience (1998)
- Sweet Experience (1999)
- Something Else (2000)
- Divine Intervention (2001)
- Fun Fair (2002)
- Life after Death (2003)
- Aspiration (2004)
- Fulfilment (2005)
- New Dawn (2005)
- Next Level (2006)
- Gratitude (2007)
- Absolute Praise (2008)
- Transformation (2009)
- Everlasting Grace (2010)
- Prayer Point (2011)
- Goodness Of God (2012)
- Comforter (2013)
- Overcomer (2014)
- Upliftment (2015)
- Fresh Glory (2016)
- Living Testimony (2017)
- Favour (2018)
- Beyond The Limits (2019)
- Ekundayo (Exhilaration) (2020)
- Manifestation (2021)
- So Far So Good (2022)
- Consolation (2023)
- Tungba Praise Pro max (2024)
- Reflections (2025)
