= Wetland FM Gashua =

- Gashua; Nigeria
- Frequency: 90.5 MHz

Programming
- Languages: English, Hausa, Kanuri, Fulani, Kare kare

Ownership
- Owner: Federal Radio Corporation of Nigeria

History
- First air date: 29 December 2024

Wetland FM Gashua (90.5 MHz) is a radio station in Gashua, Yobe State, Nigeria, part of the Federal Radio Corporation of Nigeria (FRCN).

Wetland FM began broadcasting on 29 December 2024. It was the seventh station set up in northeast Nigeria and the second in Yobe. Ahmad Lawan, a former president of the Nigerian Senate from Yobe State, was a backer of the push to add the station.
