= Purity FM =

- Mgbakwu–Awka, Anambra State; Nigeria
- Frequency: 102.5 MHz

Programming
- Languages: English, Igbo

Ownership
- Owner: Federal Radio Corporation of Nigeria

History
- First air date: July 1, 2005

Purity FM is a radio station broadcasting on 102.5 MHz FM in southeastern Nigeria, located at Mgbakwu, a village in Awka North Local Government Area, Awka, Anambra State. It is a local station owned by the Federal Radio Corporation of Nigeria.

Purity FM started test-transmission on 29 April 2005, full operation started on 1 July 2005. It was previously known as Gateway FM. A variety of music and talk programmes are broadcast in English and Igbo.
