= Max FM =

Radio station in Nigeria

Max FM Lagos
- Lagos; Nigeria
- Broadcast area: Lagos State, Ogun State, Nigeria
- Frequency: 102.3 MHz

Programming
- Language: English
- Format: Music

Ownership
- Owner: TVC Communications
- Sister stations: Max 90.9 FM Abuja

History
- First air date: 2005
- Former names: Radio Continental (2005–2017)

Links
- Website: max1023.fm

Max FM, formerly Radio Continental, is an English language Nigerian FM radio station based in Lagos. It also has a sister radio station under the same brand in Abuja, the Nigerian capital city.

== History ==
=== Radio Continental ===
Max FM first started under the name Link FM with its first transmission on band 102.3 FM in Lagos, in the year 2005. Ten months later, it was rebranded Unity 102.3 FM, with focus on general entertainment, news and sports.

=== Max 102.3 FM Lagos ===
On 21 October 2017, TVC Communications had an event at the Federal Palace Hotel in Lagos to celebrate the launching of 102.3 Max FM. The station added presenters Murphy Ijemba and Shine Begho, and retained presenters Wale PowPowPow of Wetin Day programme and Jones Usen of TVC News. TVC said the station will play music for the 15-34 age demographic. TVC Communications also replaced Continental Broadcasting Services as the trading name for the business units.

=== Max 90.9 FM Abuja ===
Max 90.9 FM
- Abuja; Nigeria
- Broadcast area: Abuja, Nigeria
- Frequency: 90.9 MHz

Programming
- Language: English
- Format: Music

Ownership
- Owner: TVC Communications
- Sister stations: Max 102.3 FM Lagos

Links
- Website: max909.fm

In September 2018, TVC Communications launched Max 90.9 FM in Abuja. The station is to follow the same music hits format as the Lagos station. Programmes and presenters include Max Breakfast with Jennifer Nzewunwah and Eyo Henry, Max Hits with Azuka Nsonwu; Watin Dey with Wale PowPowPow, Max Drive with Naomi Oboyi; Max Mix with Nellie, as well as shows from Jones Usen and Murphy Ijemba.
