= Sobi FM =

Radio station in Ilorin, Nigeria

Sobi FM Ilorin
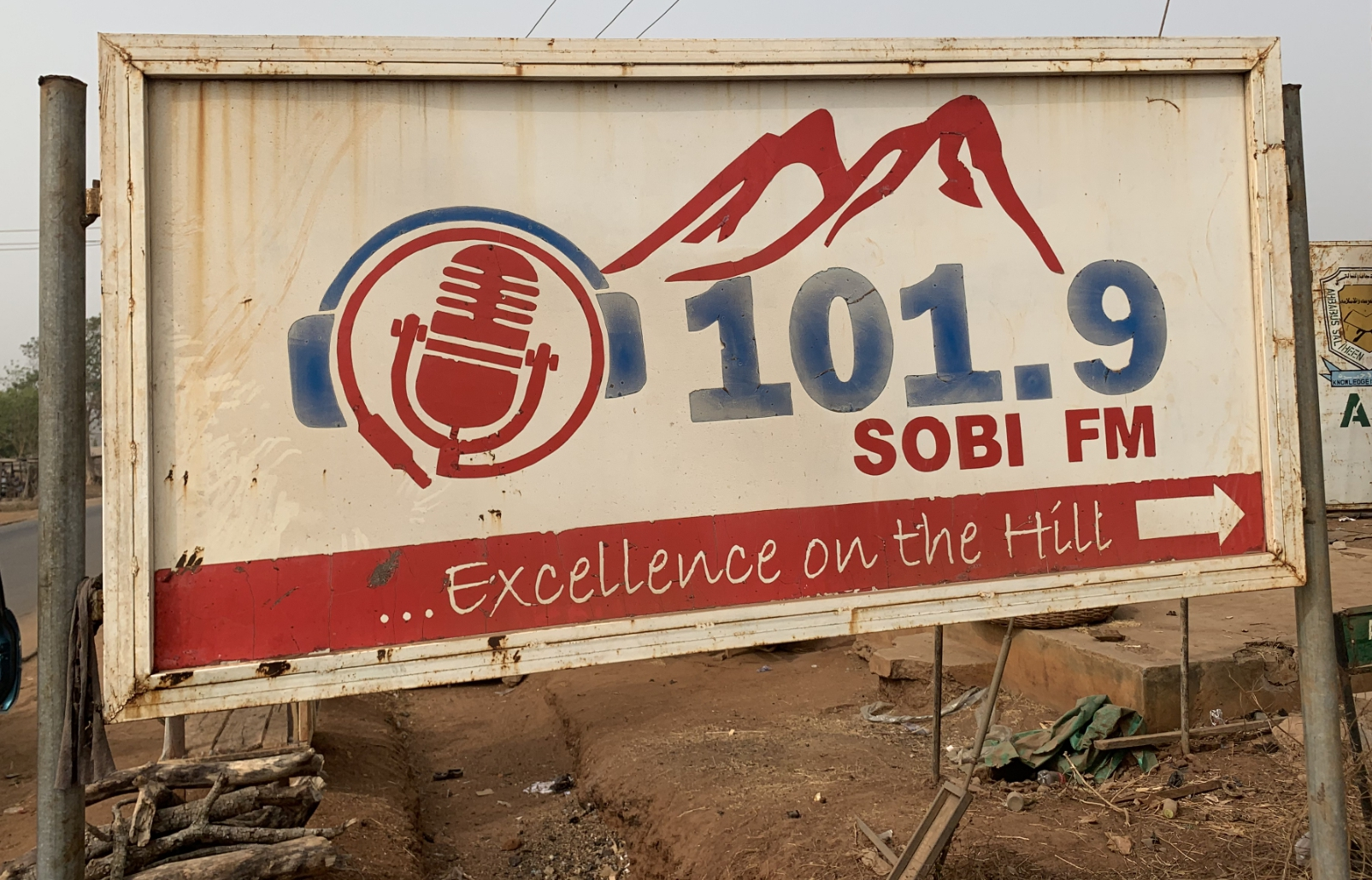

Ilorin; Nigeria
- Broadcast area: Kwara State
- Frequency: 101.9 MHz

Programming
- Language: English, Yoruba, Hausa, Nupe, Baruba, Fulfude

Ownership
- Owner: Lukman Mustapha

History
- First air date: 10 July 2017

Links
- Website: sobifm.com

Sobi FM (101.9 MHz) is a radio station based in the city of Ilorin, Kwara State, Nigeria. It was established on 10 July 2017 and is located on top of the Sobi Hill, off Shao Road, about 390 metres above sea level.

== Founder ==
The founder of Sobi FM, Lukman Akanbi Olayiwola Mustapha is a Nigerian politician and banker.
