= Midland FM =

Ilorin; Nigeria
- Broadcast area: Apata Yakuba, Ilorin
- Frequency: 99.1 MHz

Programming
- Languages: English, Yoruba

History
- Former names: Radio Kwara 2

Midland FM (99.1 MHz) is a radio station owned by the Kwara State Broadcasting Corporation in Nigeria. Midland FM was previously known as Radio Kwara 2.
