= Lagos Traffic Radio =

Traffic radio station in Lagos, Nigeria

- Lagos; Nigeria
- Broadcast area: Lagos State
- Frequency: 96.1 MHz

Programming
- Format: Highway advisory radio

History
- First air date: 29 May 2012

Links
- Website: trafficradio961.ng

Lagos Traffic Radio is a radio station broadcasting on 96.1 FM in Lagos, Nigeria. The station broadcasts traffic information for the Lagos metropolitan area.

== History ==
Lagos Traffic Radio began broadcasting on 29 May 2012 after being commissioned by Governor Babatunde Fashola. Governor Babatunde Fashola opened the state's traffic radio station in an effort to alleviate bottlenecks on the city's highways. It was conceived as a homegrown solution to reduce the metropolitan area's heavy road congestion and provide commuters with regular traffic updates. Lagos Traffic Radio is the first highway advisory radio station of its kind in the country; a second, National Traffic Radio on 107.1 FM for Abuja, was started by the Federal Road Safety Corps in November 2019. At the Marketing Edge Awards night, Lagos Traffic Radio, 96.1 FM, was named the Innovative Traffic Radio Station of the Year 2021.

== Programming ==
Traffic information is provided by the Lagos State Traffic Management Authority (LASTMA) and Federal Road Safety Corps (FRSC). Songs play between traffic reports. In January 2019, the Lagos traffic radio started the broadcasting and analyzing travel information for other modes of transportation, including air, rail, and maritime shipping. Lagos Traffic Radio is also known for broadcasting and explanation of Lagos traffic laws and doctrines guiding Lagos traffic users in English and Yoruba and engages in public safety campaigns to reduce the incidence of driving under the influence.

Lagos Traffic Radio also broadcasts some news and discussion programmes unrelated to traffic. In 2018, it added a ten-minute Yoruba programme about the administration of Governor Akinwunmi Ambode and a Saturday morning discussion show, "Talk Time", on local and regional issues.

== See also ==
- Radio Lagos
