= Ifeanyi Udeze =

Nigerian footballer

Personal information
- Date of birth: 21 July 1980 (age 46)
- Place of birth: Lagos, Nigeria
- Height: 1.79 m (5 ft 10 in)
- Position: Left-back

Senior career*
| Years | Team | Apps | (Gls) |
| 1997 | Bendel Insurance | | |
| 1997–2000 | Kavala | 59 | (0) |
| 2000–2006 | PAOK | 103 | (1) |
| 2003 | → West Bromwich Albion (loan) | 10 | (0) |
| 2006–2007 | AEK Athens | 3 | (0) |
| 2007 | Bendel Insurance | | |
| 2007–2008 | PAOK | 0 | (0) |
| Total | | 175 | (1) |

International career
| 2000–2005 | Nigeria | 35 | (0) |
- * Club domestic league appearances and goals

Ifeanyi Udeze (born 21 July 1980) is a Nigerian pundit, sports broadcaster and former professional footballer who played as a defender. He is currently a football analyst at Brila FM, in Lagos.

He participated in the 2002 World Cup, and played mainly as a left-back, he is also used as centre-back.

== Early life ==
Udeze was born in Ajegunle, Lagos, Nigeria.

== Club career ==
Udeze played for clubs such as Bendel Insurance FC, AO Kavalas (Greece) and PAOK Thessaloniki, before joining West Bromwich Albion in 2003.

In his first season with the Albion, he played in the Premier League, joining the club on loan in the latter stages of the season after which Albion were relegated.

He was released from AEK Athens in January 2007, six months after signing a three-year contract on 11 August 2006.

On 4 July 2007, he returned to PAOK, signing a two-year deal. A niggling knee injury prevented him from grabbing a first team spot and he was released after a year at the club.

== International career ==
Udeze first came into international limelight at the inaugural UEFA-CAF Meridian Cup held in Portugal in 1997, a tournament where Spain's Xavi and Portugal's Simao made their mark. He was a member of the Fanny Amun-led Nigerian squad that beat Spain 3–2 to win the tournament. Some members of the squad included Rabiu Afolabi, Joseph Enakarhire, Bright Igbinadolor, Chijioke Nwankpa, Hashimu Garba, and Mohammed Aliyu Datti.

Having made his full international debut in 2001, Udeze went on to feature for Nigeria at the 2002 African Cup of Nations and 2004, and the 2002 World Cup, playing two games.

At the 2002 African Cup of Nations held in Mali, he was selected among the CAF Team of the Tournament.

In 2004, Udeze announced his decision to end his international career.

Ifeanyi Udeze last featured for Nigeria in a 2006 World Cup qualifier against Angola in 2005.

== Playing style ==
Udeze was noted for his feistiness, intelligent marking and remarkable recovery rate. He was Nigeria's most fouled defender in games he featured in.
