= Tin City FM =

Jos, Plateau State; Nigeria
- Frequency: 104.3 MHz

Ownership
- Owner: Rev. Fr. Martin Dama

History
- First air date: 2016

Tin City FM (104.3 MHz) is a private radio station, located in Jos, Plateau State, Nigeria. It was founded by Rev. Fr. Martin Dama and began broadcasting in 2016.
