= Ernest Okonkwo =

Nigerian sport commentator and journalist

Ernest Okonkwo (born 1936) was a Nigerian sport commentator and journalist who worked at Radio Nigeria. He died on 7 August 1990.
