= Magic FM Aba =

Abia, Nigeria, based FM radio station

- Company type: Private
- Industry: Broadcasting
- Founded: May 15, 2013.
- Founder: Saturn Communications Limited.
- Fate: Active
- Headquarters: Aba, Nigeria
- Key people: Eziuche Ubani (Director)
- Website: www.magicfm.ng

Magic FM is a radio station based in Aba, the commercial city of Abia State. Established on May 15, 2013, the broadcaster transmits programs daily on 102.9 FM.
