= Dandal Kura Radio =

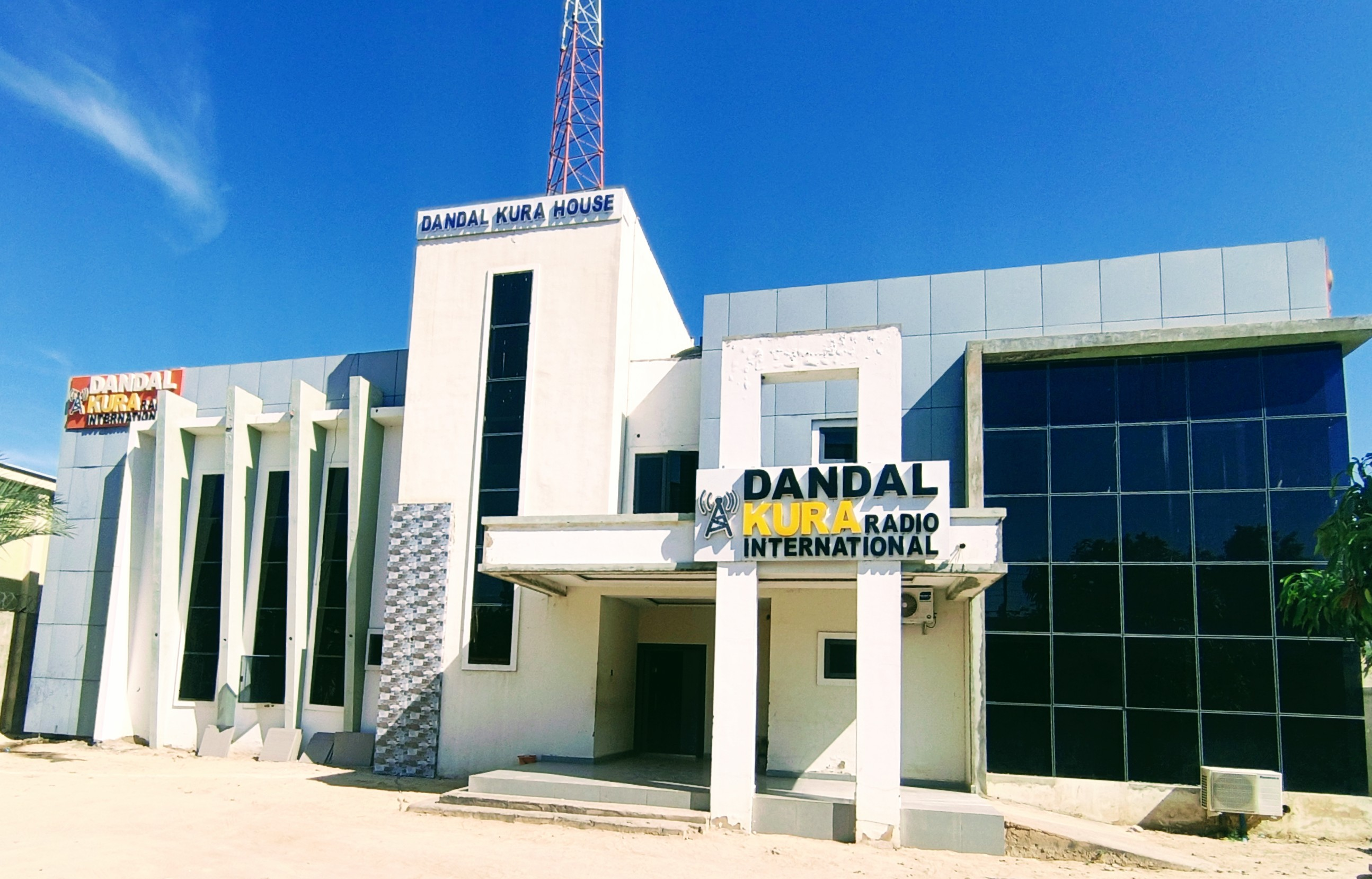
- Maiduguri, Borno State; Nigeria
- Broadcast area: Lake Chad Basin
- Frequency: 98.9 FM Maiduguri

Programming
- Languages: Kanuri, Hausa, English
- Format: Public service broadcasting

Ownership
- Owner: Dandal Kura Media Ltd.

History
- First air date: 2015

Dandal Kura Radio is a radio station in Nigeria, located in Maiduguri Borno state, it broadcasts on 98.9 MHz across lake chad region, Nigeria, Niger, Chad and Cameroon.

== History ==
Dandal Kura Radio was created in 2015 to give people in Northeast Nigeria true and reliable information during the conflict. The station helps communities stay united, supports recovery and allows people from the Lake Chad region to share their stories.

== See also ==
- Media in Nigeria
- Lake Chad
- Maiduguri
