= National Traffic Radio =

Radio station in Abuja, Nigeria

- Abuja; Nigeria
- Broadcast area: Federal Capital Territory
- Frequency: 107.1 MHz

Programming
- Format: Highway advisory radio

Ownership
- Owner: Federal Road Safety Corps

History
- First air date: November 12, 2019

Links
- Webcast: frsc.gov.ng/live-radio/

National Traffic Radio is a Nigerian radio station owned by the Federal Road Safety Corps (FRSC) and broadcasting on 107.1 MHz to Abuja.

The idea for the station came after FRSC corps marshal Boboye Oyeyemi visited Lagos Traffic Radio, a similar station on the air in Lagos since 2012. Broadcasting began on a test basis on 12 November 2019, but formal inauguration did not take place until 15 June 2021, when Vice President Yemi Osinbajo visited the station and did a short on-air shift.
