= Oluwole Oladejo Adetiran =

Nigerian musician (1948–2022)

- Born: 8 September 1948; Osun State
- Died: 6 May 2022 (aged 73); Owode, Ogun State
- Education: University of Nigeria
- Occupations: Musician, academic

Oluwole Oladejo Adetiran (8 September 1948 – 6 May 2022) was a Nigerian musician and chief lecturer at the Federal Polytechnic of Ibadan. He was dean of eight departments and the founder of Music Technology Department. He is the composer of National Youth Service Corps anthem and the inaugural rector of the Celestial Church of Christ Academy of Music Technology.

== Early life and education ==
He was born on 8 September 1948 to the Family of Adetiran in Igbajo now the present day Osun State. He was a graduate of music at the University of Nigeria, Nsukka.

== Music career ==
Oluwole started his music career on the street and later joined First Baptist Church choirs in Ibadan. He was also a guitarist, he learnt it from a returnee from the present day Ghana (gold coast), and in 1963 he became an expert. In 1965 he was made the cathedral organist.

== Academic career ==
He started his career as an assistant lecturer at the Federal Polytechnic Ibadan. He lectured for 30 years out of which he became a chief lecturer in 1999.
