= Aso Radio =

Radio station in Abuja, Nigeria

- Abuja; Nigeria
- Frequency: 93.5 MHz

Ownership
- Owner: Federal Capital Territory Administration

History
- First air date: 19 May 1999

Technical information
- Transmitter coordinates: 4°48′48″N 7°00′17″E

Aso Radio (93.5 FM) is a Nigerian radio station located in Abuja, the Federal Capital Territory of Nigeria, and owned by the Federal Capital Territory Administration. The station was established in 1997 by Rtd. Brigadier General Jeremiah Timbut Useni, the then-Minister of the Federal Capital Territory (FCT). Studios and the primary transmitter are located on Katampe Hill, with retransmitters at Karshi, Abaji, and Bwari.

On 19 May 1999, Rtd General Mamman T. Kontagora, the Minister of the Federal Capital Territory, commissioned the station and it began regular broadcasting. A television station, Aso TV, was announced in 2008, but it did not start until 2012.

While government-owned, Aso TV is also partly financed by advertising.
