= Diamond FM (Ilorin) =

Radio station in Ilorin, Kwara, Nigeria

Ilorin; Nigeria
- Broadcast area: Kwara State, Nigeria
- Frequency: 88.7 MHz

Programming
- Language: English, Yoruba

Ownership
- Owner: Bright Broadcasting Ltd.

History
- First air date: 2020

Links
- Website: diamondfm.net

Diamond FM (88.7 MHz) is a radio station in Ilorin, Kwara State, Nigeria. The station began operating on 22 December 2020.

In 2021, the launch of a sister television channel, Diamond TV, was announced.
