= Gbenga Adeboye =

Nigerian musician and comedian (1959–2003)

- Born: 30 September 1959; Odeomu, Western Region, British Nigeria (now in Osun State, Nigeria)
- Died: 30 April 2003 (aged 43); Lagos, Nigeria
- Other name: Funwontan
- Citizenship: Nigeria
- Occupation: Comedian
- Spouse: Omolara Gbenga Adeboye
- Parent: Rebecca Tinuola Adeboye (mother)
- Relatives: Damilola Gbenga Adeboye (Daughter)

Gbenga Adeboye (30 September 1959 – 30 April 2003) was a Nigerian singer, comedian, radio presenter, broadcaster and master of ceremony, popularly known as Funwontan. Until his death, he was popular internationally in the entertainment industry.

== Early life ==
Elijah Oluwagbemiga Adeboye was born on 30 September 1959 at Ode-Omu, Osun State, southwestern Nigeria, West Africa.

== Career ==
Adeboye was a chief host of a popular radio program presented in Lagos State Broadcasting Corporation in the early 1980s where he got the household name Funwontan Oduology. Gbenga adeboye was described as a generous comedian by a veteran Nigerian actress, Idowu Philips whose first car was a gift from the comedian. He was also described as merchant and performer of traditional Oduology by his fans before he died of kidney-related diseases on 30 April 2003.

== See also ==
- Yinka Ayefele - performed a tribute to Adeboye.
