= Fresh FM (Nigeria) =

Radio network in Nigeria

- Nigeria
- Frequencies: Abeokuta: 107.9 MHz; Ado-Ekiti: 106.9 MHz; Akure: 102.9 MHz; Ibadan: 105.9 MHz; Lagos: 105.3 MHz; Osogbo: 104.9 MHz

Programming
- Languages: English, Yoruba

Ownership
- Owner: Yinka Ayefele

History
- First air date: 2015 with the launch of the Ibadan station

Links
- Website: www.freshfmnigeria.com

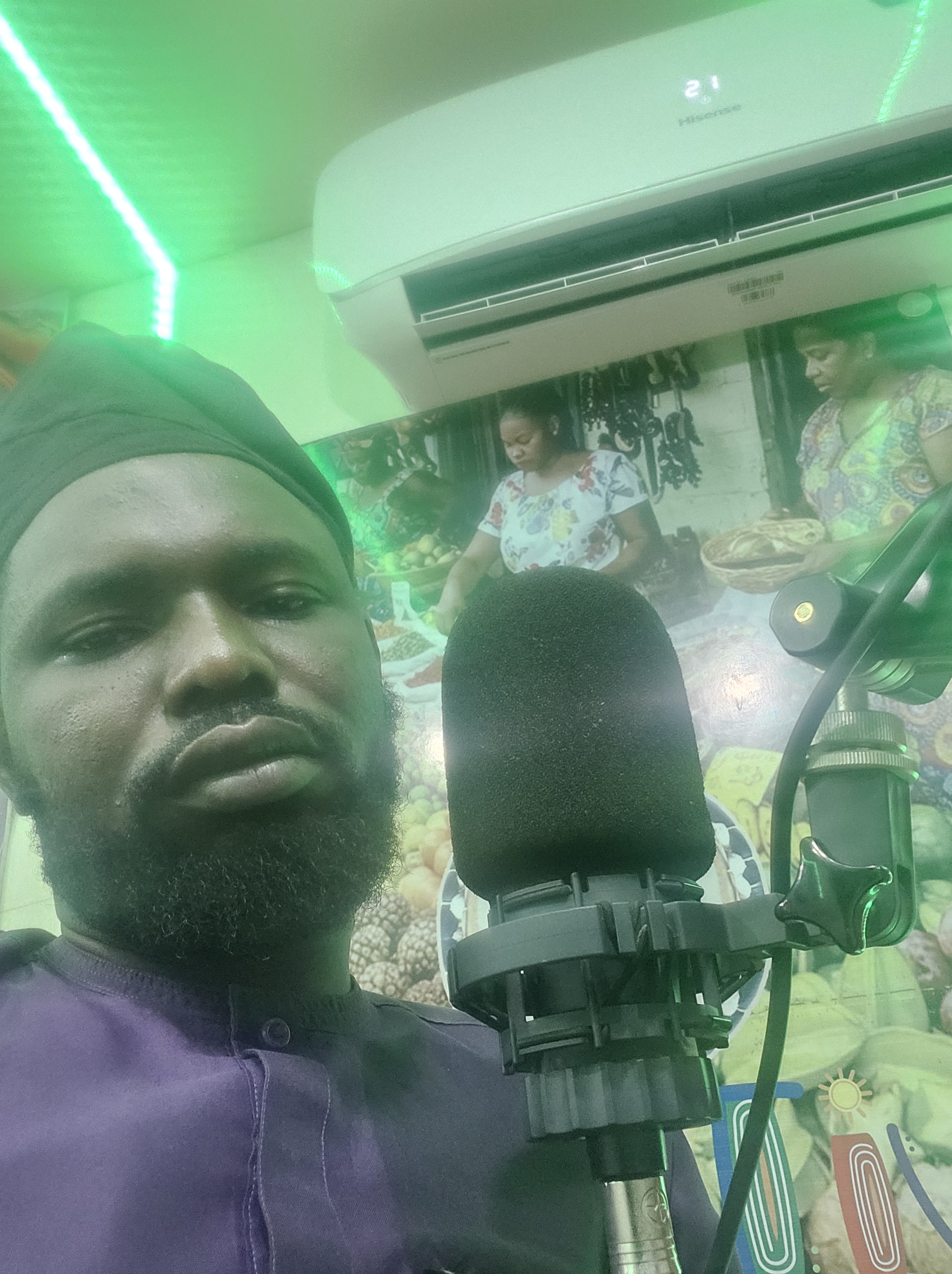
Fresh FM

Fresh FM is a network of radio stations in Nigeria, owned by Olayinka Joel Ayefele. Fresh FM stations are located in Abeokuta, Ado-Ekiti, Akure, Ibadan, Lagos, Osogbo and ilorin 107.9

== History ==
Programming began to Ibadan in 2015 and Abeokuta in 2018; the Ado-Ekiti station began broadcasting in 2020. The network expanded to Osogbo in October 2021 and to Lagos in 2022; a frequency for Ilorin has also been announced. Fresh FM is stationed in all the 6 SouthWest States of Nigeria with a vision for expansion to other regions in the nearest future.

== Stations ==
| City | State | Frequency | Founded |
|---|---|---|---|
| Ibadan | Oyo State | 105.9 FM | 2015 |
| Lagos | Lagos State | 105.3 FM | 2020 |
| Akure | Ondo State | 102.9 FM | 2020 |
| Osogbo | Osun State | 104.9 FM | 2021 |
| Ado-Ekiti | Ekiti State | 106.9 FM | 2021 |
| Abeokuta | Ogun State | 107.9 FM | 2022 |
| Ilorin | Kwara State | 107.9 FM | 2026 |
