= Unilorin FM =

- Ilorin; Nigeria
- Frequency: 89.3 MHz

Programming
- Languages: English, Yoruba

Ownership
- Owner: University of Ilorin

History
- First air date: 2009

Links
- Website: fm.unilorin.edu.ng

Unilorin FM is a radio station operated by the University of Ilorin, in Kwara State, Nigeria. The radio station operates on the 89.3 MHz frequency. The radio station started operations on August 13, 2009. The radio station provides informative, educative and entertaining programs.
