= Albarka Radio =

- Bauchi, Bauchi State; Nigeria
- Frequency: 97.5 MHz

History
- First air date: November 1, 2017

Technical information
- Transmitter coordinates: 10°18′23.6232″N 9°47′11.1048″E

Links
- Website: albarkaradio.com

Albarka Radio is a radio station broadcasting on 97.5 MHz FM located in Bauchi, Bauchi State, Nigeria.

The station started full operation on 1 November 2017. In 2019, one of the station's on-air personalities, Ibrahim Bababa, was attacked by several people who stormed the station during his shift.
