= Oluyole FM =

Ibadan; Nigeria
- Frequency: 98.5 MHz

Ownership
- Owner: Broadcasting Corporation of Oyo State

History
- First air date: 1972
- Former names: Radio O.Y.O. 2

Links
- Website: bcos.tv

Oluyole FM (98.5 MHz) is a Nigerian radio station in Ibadan, owned by the public Broadcasting Corporation of Oyo State (BCOS). BCOS also operates television channel BCOS TV.

The station went on air in 1972 as a companion to an AM service and was known as Radio O.Y.O. 2 until 2009, when the name was changed by Otunba Christopher Adebayo Alao-Akala, former governor of the state.
