= Nigeria Info =

Nigerian talk radio network

- Nigeria
- Frequencies: 99.3 MHz (Lagos); 95.1 MHz (Abuja); 92.3 MHz (Port Harcourt)

Programming
- Format: Talk radio

Ownership
- Owner: Info FM Nigeria Limited

Links
- Website: nigeriainfo.fm

Nigeria Info is a network of talk radio stations in Nigeria, broadcasting on 99.3 MHz in Lagos, 95.1 MHz in Abuja, and 92.3 MHz in Port Harcourt. Owned by Info FM Nigeria Limited, the stations broadcast local and international news with a blend of talk and sports shows, while addressing current affairs and topical issues in Nigeria.

== History ==
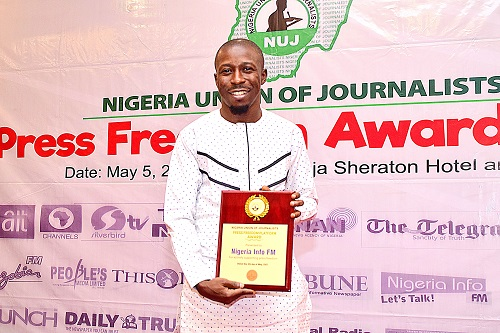
Femi D Amele, manager of Nigeria Info in Abuja, with the NUJ Press Freedom Award 2021

Nigeria Info began in Lagos in 2011, and in Abuja on 30 November 2012. The network previously aired a five-hour weekday show hosted by Adenike Oyetunde.

In 2021, the Abuja station, managed by Femi D Amele, received a Press Freedom Award from the Nigeria Union of Journalists.

In 2020, the National Broadcasting Commission fined Nigeria Info's Lagos station 5 million naira for a comment made on one of its programs that was deemed to be hate speech.
