= Jay FM =

Jos, Plateau State; Nigeria
- Frequency: 101.9 MHz

History
- First air date: September 2016

Links
- Website: jayfm.ng

Jay FM (101.9 MHz) is a private radio station in Jos, Plateau State, Nigeria. The station features a mix of diverse music genres and talk shows with special focus on local and global news, current affairs, and sports. The radio station airs and streams for 24 hours.

The Jos-based radio station started broadcasting in September 2016.

On 1 March 2019, the radio station was shut from operation by the National Broadcasting Commission (NBC). The station was said to have broadcast hate speech. That led to the station taking NBC to court, and an out-of-court settlement was ensued by the two parties, which led to the reopening of the station on 15 May 2019.
