= Federal Radio Corporation of Nigeria =

Public broadcast organization of Nigeria

The Federal Radio Corporation of Nigeria (FRCN) is a Nigerian state radio broadcasting organization. Its flagship station is the syndicated radio network Radio Nigeria, with FM stations across the 36 states and Zonal station in the 6 geopolitical zones that broadcast in the SW (South West – Ibadan, South Central – Yenagoa, South East – Enugu, North East – Maiduguri, North Central – Makurdi, North West – Kaduna). According to FRCN, it is the largest broadcasting organization in Africa.

== History ==
The Federal Radio Corporation of Nigeria was founded in 1933 by the British colonial government. Named the Radio Diffusion Service (RDS), it allowed the public to hear the British Broadcasting Corporation's foreign radio service broadcasts in certain public locations over loudspeakers.

In April 1950, the RDS became the Nigerian Broadcasting Service and introduced radio stations in Lagos, Kaduna, Enugu, Ibadan, and Kano. This service was reorganized into the Nigerian Broadcasting Corporation (NBC) on April 1, 1957, by act of parliament. Its mission was to "provide, as a public service, independent and impartial broadcasting services". By 1962 the NBC had expanded its broadcast stations into Sokoto, Maiduguri, Ilorin, Zaria, Jos, and Katsina in the north; Port Harcourt, Calabar, and Onitsha in the East; and Abeokuta, Warri, and Ijebu-Ode in the West. Each of these stations was considered a subsidiary station of a regional station. The subsidiary stations broadcast local interest programs during part of the day, and then relayed programming from their regional station during the rest of the broadcast day. National programs were broadcast from two shortwave transmitters and one medium wave transmitter located in Sogunle, near Lagos.

In late 1960, the Federal Parliament amended the NBC Ordinance to allow the sale of commercial advertisements. The first ads ran on October 31, 1961, and were broadcast from Lagos. By 1962 regional and provincial broadcasters began selling ads to local businesses. The goal of allowing radio advertisements was to help provide additional funding to NBC stations beyond that received from the government.

The Federal Parliament approved the creation of the Voice of Nigeria (VON) external shortwave service in 1961. Broadcasts began on January 1, 1961, from Lagos State. Its initial operations were limited to two hours a day to West Africa, but by 1963 VON had expanded both its coverage and transmission times with the addition of five additional transmitters.

In April 1961, with financial assistance from the Ford Foundation and technical assistance from the British Broadcasting Corporation, NBC began the National School Broadcasting Service in April 1961. The NBC Schools unit broadcast lessons in various school subjects for primary and secondary schools, as well as special programs for teacher training colleges. The Schools unit was based in Ibadan.

The NBC and the Broadcasting Corporation of Northern Nigeria (BCNN) were merged in 1978 to become the Federal Radio Corporation of Nigeria (FRCN). Mediumwave transmitters previously owned by the NBC were transferred to the individual state governments where the transmitters were located. At the same time, the states transferred shortwave transmitters to the FRCN.

In 1996, VON installed three high power transmitters at its Ikorodu transmitter site, allowing worldwide transmissions for the first time.

== FRCN today ==
FRCN's medium wave service, Radio Nigeria, has 25 stations located across the country, and together with Voice of Nigeria, considers itself to have the largest radio network in Africa. In 2007, FRCN began introducing FM transmitters in some locations, and plans to begin upgrading and modernizing its shortwave and medium wave transmitters in the coming years.

== Broadcast Academy ==
The FRCN operates a training arm, the National Broadcast Academy. The academy was established in 1957 at Ikoyi as an in-house training department of Radio Nigeria.
