= John Oboh =

Nigerian singer-songwriter and producer (born 1967)

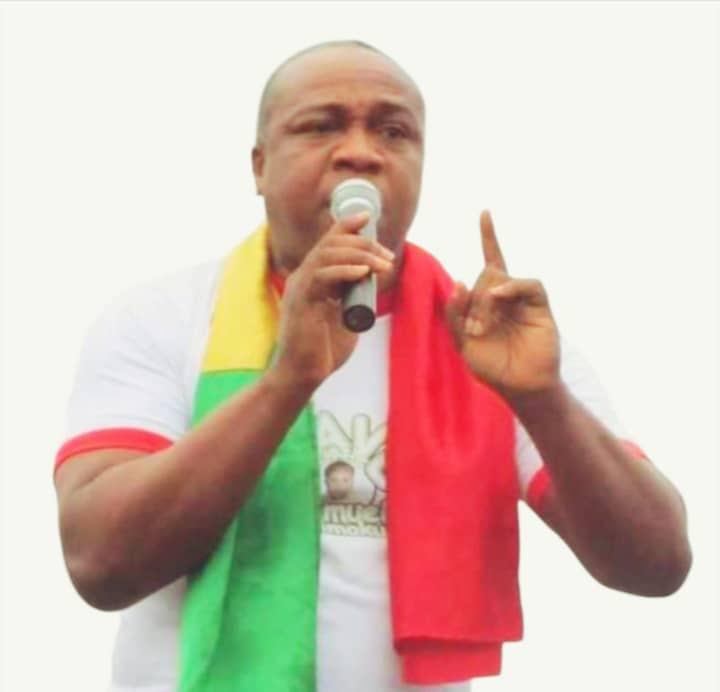

Background information
- Born: John Aigbokhan Oboh; 25 April 1967; Lagos State
- Died: 18 September 2023 (aged 56) Lagos University Teaching Hospital (LUTH), Idiaraba
- Genres: Ajegunle music
- Occupations: Singer-songwriter, recording artist, producer
- Label: Jahoha Studio

John Oboh (25 April 1967 – 18 September 2023) also known as Mighty Mouse, was a Nigerian music Producer, composer and musician. He pioneered the AJegunle music beat (Aj music), a Nigerian music genre that combines Edo Nigeria Esan samba, reggae and jazz. He was awarded by the Nigerian Books of Record.

== Early life ==
John Oboh was born on 25 April 1967 into the Family of Chief Major Humphrey Etafo Oboh from Ugboha, Esan, Edo State, and Chief Mrs Comfort Eimiebaluye Oboh née Obhiemie from Emu Kingdom, Esan, Edo State, Nigeria. He is the brother of former British boxing light heavyweight champion Peter Oboh and sister to fine Artist/collector Josephine Oboh Macleod. Mighty mouse attended Trinity Secondary School. He Studied music in Dublin Ireland before moving to Boston, Massachusetts, USA to study Business Administration at Roxbury Community College.

== Career ==
John Oboh is known and recognised as the creator of the Ajegunle music Genre in the 1990s which was generated from Ajegunle a sound that surfed the airwaves across radio stations at the time.

He created Ajegunle Music (AJ music) genre using ancient Esan samba beat, and other African percussions which he later infused with reggae and jazz music, that has come to be known and recognized as AJ music.

In 1991, his sister, Mabel Oboh a broadcaster/actress and Talk Show host financed the establishment of Jahoha Digital Studios. As a music producer and director, he played a pivotal role in producing Daddy Showkey which popularized the dance step Galala (dance) and other dance steps such as konto, Alanta dance, Sour, etc. now associated to AJegunle music. He produced his famous single Folashade, Abuja, and other famous AJegunle artists such as Daddy Fresh, etc. Jahoha Studios became the great music production home for the likes of artists such as Baba Fryo, African China, Oritse Femi, Marvelous Benji, Danfo Drivers, Nico Gravity, Norman Macleod (Piper Norman) of “Afro-Scot” Music Legacy and others.

He formed a repatriation sound promotion in the mid-1990s. He used his music to state the suffering of poor and black people in the Western world and encouraged the repatriation of black people back to their roots (Africa) for self-dignity and a stop to modern slavery.

He died at Lagos University Teaching Hospital (LUTH), Idiaraba on September 18, 2023, while battling with cancer.
