= African reggae =

Music genre

Though reggae music first developed in Jamaica, it has strong rhythmic and thematic associations with Africa and has been called "the quintessential African/third world/black musical form". There are many African reggae musicians with a wide fan base both on the continent and abroad. Well-known African reggae artists are Alpha Blondy, Pax Nindi aka Harare Dread, Majek Fashek, Tiken Jah Fakoly, Colbert Mukwevho, Thomani Tshikororo, Ismael Isaac, Radical Dread, Jambo, Soul Raiders, Lucky Dube, and Serges Kassy.

== History ==
The popularity of Reggae in Africa started with the spread of music by Jamaican artists like Bob Marley and Jimmy Cliff in the late 1960s and 1970s. While their music was popular around the world, it was particularly well-received in Africa. One of the first hit songs by an African artist with distinct reggae qualities was "Fire In Soweto" by Sonny Okosun in 1978.

More groups followed suit, and reggae was one of the most popular genres of music in the late 1970s in Africa. In Freetown, Sierra Leone, John Nunley said that reggae was all over the urban soundscape.

In 1980, world-famous Jamaican reggae musician Bob Marley performed in Harare, Zimbabwe, and that concert is often credited as marking the beginning of reggae in Africa.

=== Reggae in Ivory Coast ===
Reggae is perhaps most popular in the Ivory Coast. Former member of The Wailers Tyrone Downie said in an interview: "The first time I went to Abidjan, I was astonished by the fact that all cafés played reggae, all bands played reggae, you could hear reggae everywhere, in taxis, at people’s houses, at dances, in the ghetto, EVERYWHERE!". Ivorian Reggae Artist Kajim said "Ivory Coast is one of the first countries in Africa known for its reggae...In other parts of the world, when the military take power, you hear other sorts of music on the radio. But here when the military took power they played reggae, because in our country reggae is known as the music of change, the music of combat! Here our music is a weapon, and it is not the same thing in other countries."

==== Alpha Blondy ====
In the early 1980s Ivorian Artist Alpha Blondy emerged as a major African reggae recording artist with the album Jah Glory. The top single from that album was the song "Brigadier Sabari", recounting an incident where the singer was nearly beaten to death by police in Abidjan. It was the first time a West African artist had openly criticized police brutality in popular music. Alpha Blondy has continued to release popular albums through the 2020s that received widespread international popularity and he has been called "The Bob Marley of Africa".

==== Tiken Jah Fakoly ====
Born to a family of traditional African oral historians known as griots, Tiken Jah Fakoly began recording reggae music in 1987 with the band "Djelys", another word for native griots and minstrels. Fakoly's lyrics are often political, like his song Françafrique, which blames France and America of being the origin of poverty and conflicts in most African Countries.

=== Reggae in South Africa ===
During the 1970s and 1980s, Jamaican and other reggae artists released songs with politically pointed lyrics about the political situation in South Africa like Peter Tosh's "Apartheid", Bunny Wailer's "Botha The Mosquito". Jimmy Cliff played at Orlando Stadium in Soweto in 1980, and many South Africans were inspired by Bob Marley's performance in Zimbabwe, and Peter Tosh's 1983 visit to Swaziland. Major South African artists included Carlos Djedje, Colbert Mukwevho, Lucky Dube, Jambo, Thomani Tshikororo, and the band O'Yaba.

==== Lucky Dube ====
South African musician Lucky Dube found international success in the 1990s with albums like Victims and Rastas Never Dies. Victims sold more than 1 million copies and Dube toured North America to support the album.

=== Reggae in Nigeria ===
Reggae music was popularized in Nigeria by Majek Fashek in the mid-1980s. Radio Nigeria stations began to play a large number of reggae artists.

Nigerian reggae artists such as Daniel Wilson, Jerri Jheto, Daddy Showkey, Ras Kimono, Victor Essiet (from “The Mandators”), Evi Edna Ogholi, and Peterside Ottong became well-known, and subgenres like dancehall, ragga, and galala began to grow in popularity.
