= Mabel Oboh =

Nigerian broadcaster, film producer and actor

Mabel Akomu Oboh
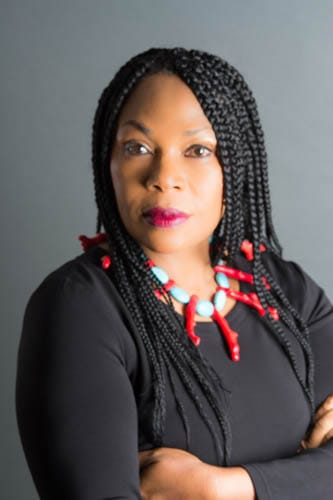
- Born: 18 April 1964 (age 61); Lagos State, Nigeria
- Other names: Mabel Oboh
- Education: Degree in Criminology.
- Alma mater: Buckinghamshire New University
- Occupations: Broadcaster, journalist, actress, producer, director
- Children: 3
- Parent(s): Major Humphrey, Etafo Oboh and the late Mrs Comfort

Mabel Akomu Oboh, popularly known as Mabel Oboh is a Nigerian politician, broadcaster, actress, film producer and founder Mabeloboh Center For Save Our Stars (MOCSOS). She is the first television film independent producer/director and the second female soap opera producer in Nigeria with her drama series titled Victims that later became a network productions in the '80s on Nigerian Television Authority.

== Early life ==
Mabel Oboh hails from Edo State, Nigeria. She was born in Lagos into the family of the late Major Humphrey Etafo Oboh and the late Mrs Comfort Oboh. She is an alumna of Buckinghamshire New University where she had her degree in Criminology.

== Career ==
Oboh started her career in the entertainment industry in the early 80s after her training in cinematograph, stage craft, speech and drama. She became the second female independent producer and director in Nigeria with her drama series titled Victims that later became a network productions in the '80s and was aired on Nigerian Television Authority (NTA). In the year 2000, she became the first chat show hostess 'Chat with Mabel' on NTA Network Service.

She joined NTA in the 1990s as a news correspondent to the Lagos State house, before working with United Nations and later left UN and joined British Embassy in Poland in the commercial and Visa sections.

Oboh donated the first music studio in Agegunle; Owned by her brother John Oboh, aka mighty mouse who created the Ajegunle beat genre in 1991. Her contribution helped to discover and produce Daddy Showkey, Daddy Fresh, Baba Fryo, African China, Danfo Drivers and Marvelous Benji. She was given a recognition award in 2017 by AJ to the world. She is an awardee of Nigerian Books of Record and In 2023, she received Yessiey Award as 'Media Personality of the year'.

== Politics ==
In 2020, Oboh joined ADC and becoming the party public spokesperson of African Democratic Congress (ADC) in Lagos State.

She was an aspirant on the platform of African Democratic Congress in the 2020 Edo State gubernatorial election.

Oboh became the gubernatorial candidate of the African Democratic Congress (ADC) in the 19 September 2020, governorship election in Edo State. She defected to the Peoples Democratic Party (PDP) after coming fourth in the 2020 Edo State gubernatorial election.

In 2022, she returned back to African Democratic Congress (ADC) and was appointed the Party National Diversity and Inclusion (D&I) Secretary where she would be relating with the electorate.

In 2023, she was appointed executive board member, media, and international relations of Conservatives Friends of Africa Scotland, UK (CFoAfricaScotland) and African Democratic Congress (ADC) National Publicity Secretary of the party.

In 2025, She was appointed as the Director of Communications for the African Democratic Congress (ADC) Lagos State before becoming the ADC South-South Zonal Publicity Secretary and A Member of ADC Edo State and Zonal Leadership Team.

== Mocsos ==
She founded the Mabel Oboh Centre for Save our Stars (MOCSOS), with the sole aim of catering to the health needs of Nigerian entertainers. The foundation has assisted Yellow Banton and Sadiq Daba.

== Personal life ==
She has three sons: Magnus I. Oboh Leonard, Jason Eloyowan Leonard, and Ralph Leonard.
