= Oboh =

Oboh is an African surname. Notable people with this surname include:

- Francisca Oboh Ikuenobe, Nigerian geologist
- Hadiza Lantana Oboh (1959–1998), Nigerian pilot
- Joseph Oboh Kalu (born 1940), Nigerian boxer
- Josephine Oboh Macleod (born 1965), artist and politician
- Mabel Oboh (born 1964), Nigerian television broadcaster and politician
- Peter Oboh (born 1968), Nigerian boxer
- Samuel Oboh (born 1971), Canadian architect
- Solomon Oboh (1989–2013), Nigerian football player
- Sunday Oboh (born 1987), Nigerian football player

== See also ==
- Oboe
