= Oriyomi Abiodun Sofowora =

Nigerian judge

Hon. Justice Oriyomi Abiodun Sofowora

Judge of the Customary Court of Appeal, Ogun State
- Incumbent
- Assumed office 14 July 2023
- Appointed by: Dapo Abiodun

Personal details
- Born: December 12, 1965 (age 60) Sagamu, Ogun State, Nigeria
- Education: Olabisi Onabanjo University (LL.B), University of Lagos (LL.M)

Oriyomi Abiodun Sofowora (née Lawal-Afariogun) is a Nigerian jurist and a Judge of the Customary Court of Appeal, Ogun State. She is a former Chief Registrar of the Ogun State Customary Court of Appeal.

== Early life and education ==
Oriyomi Abiodun Sofowora was born on 12 December 1965 in Ofin, Sagamu, Ogun State. She attended primary school at Wesley School, Oko II, Sagamu, and secondary school at Federal Government Girls' College, Bakori, and Federal Government College, Malali, Kaduna State.

Sofowora got her law degree at Ogun State University. She has an LL.M. from the University of Lagos. She to the Nigerian bar in 1989.

== Career ==
=== Legal Practice and Corporate Sector ===
Sofowora began her legal career during her National Youth Service Corps at Ahmadu Bello University, Zaria, where she lectured and practiced at Femi Olufokunbi & Co. in Zaria. She later worked at Cheakely Chambers in Ijora, Lagos.

She subsequently entered the corporate sector, serving as company secretary and legal adviser for Thomas Wyatt Nigeria Plc and Eko Corp Plc in Ikeja, Lagos. She then joined the law firm of Okunuga and Okunuga & Co. in Oregun, Lagos.

=== Magistracy and administration ===
In 2005, Sofowora was appointed a Senior Magistrate Grade I in the Ogun State Judiciary. She served in various magisterial districts and presided over revenue and mobile courts.

She held several administrative positions, including:

- Chairman of the Magistrates' Association of Nigeria (Ogun State Chapter)
- Acting deputy chief registrar (administration)
- Coordinating Director of the Ogun Multi-Door Courthouse
- Chief Registrar of the Ogun State Customary Court of Appeal

Sofowora is a fellow of the Institute of Chartered Secretaries and Administrators of Nigeria and served as chairman of its Ogun State chapter.

=== Judicial appointment ===
In June 2023, the National Judicial Council recommended her for appointment as a judge. On 14 July 2023, she was sworn in as a judge of the Customary Court of Appeal of Ogun State by Governor Dapo Abiodun.
