= Olukemi Folasade Osisanya =

Nigerian jurist

Hon. Justice Olukemi Folasade Osisanya

Judge of the Customary Court of Appeal, Ogun State
- Incumbent
- Assumed office 21 December 2021
- Appointed by: Dapo Abiodun

Personal details
- Born: December 22, 1962 (age 63) Ibadan, Oyo State, Nigeria
- Education: Obafemi Awolowo University (B.A.), Olabisi Onabanjo University (LL.B.)
- Occupation: Jurist
- Profession: Judge

Olukemi Folasade Osisanya (born 22 December 1962) is a Nigerian jurist who serves as a Judge of the Customary Court of Appeal, Ogun State. She was appointed to the bench on 21 December 2021 by Governor Dapo Abiodun.

== Background ==
Osisanya was born on 22 December 1962 in Ibadan, Oyo State. She is from Orile-Imo in the Obafemi Owode Local Government Area of Ogun State.

She obtained her Higher School Certificate from Federal Government Girls College, Sagamu. In 1984, she earned a Bachelor of Arts degree in English from the University of Ife (now Obafemi Awolowo University). She later studied law at Ogun State University, where she obtained an LL.B. She was called to the Nigerian Bar in 1990.

== Judicial career ==
Osisanya began her legal career as Company/Legal Secretary for Vanguard Security Company before joining Lawson Thomas and Colleagues. She also worked at the chambers of Oloruntoba Mamora & Co in Ijebu Ode as a Counsel.

She established her own firm, Kemi Osisanya & Co, where she served as Principal Partner until her appointment to the bench. On 21 December 2021, she was sworn in as a Judge of the Customary Court of Appeal, Ogun State.
