= Taiwo Babatunde Alli =

Nigerian entrepreneur

- Born: Taiwo Babatunde Alli
- Citizenship: Nigeria
- Occupations: Entrepreneur and Philanthropist

Taiwo Babatunde Alli (born July 1969) is a Nigerian entrepreneur and philanthropist. He is the co-founder of Clifton Homes Nigeria Limited.

He was awarded by the Nigerian Books of Record (NBR) and also inducted into 2024 NBR Hall of Fame.

== Early life and education ==
Taiwo Babatunde Alli was born in July 1969 into a Yoruba family rooted in Ogun State, Nigeria. Alli has a BSc, Hons, Business Administration, Ogun State University, OND Business Administration, Ogun State Polytechnic, MSc Information Systems Management, De Montfort University (United Kingdom).

== Career ==
Taiwo Babatunde Alli is the managing director in several organizations, including Pacific Homes Limited in the United Kingdom.

Alli contributed to Nigerian Digital transformation program delivery and initiatives that are connected to trade facilitation, investment, and economic development.

In 2018, he was instrumental in the pioneering of affordable and sustainable housing solutions and also redefining modern living in the urban areas of Nigeria through his planning and execution.

In 2020,He was awarded at the Global Excellence Recognition Awards as Real Estate Personality of the Year and was also nominated by P.M. News as entrepreneur of the year. His initiative has been instrumental in rehabilitating men, women, and children who are victims of the Boko Haram terrorist organization in Nigeria.

In 2022, Alli was Nominated by New Telegraph as business man of the year and also male Real Estate Leader of the Year for his outstanding contributions to the industry.

In 2024, Nigerian Tribune Celebrated him among 10 inspiring seasoned and innovative IT business expert in Nigeria.

== Professional membership ==
Alli is a Fellow of the Nigeria Computer Society (FNCS), Fellow Project Management Institute, Fellow Chartered Institute of Personnel and Development (FCIPD), Fellow, Nigerian Institute of Architects. He is also a member of the Nigerian Society of Engineers (NSE).
