= Hadiza =

Hadiza is a given name of Northern Nigerian origin, equivalent to Khadija. Notable people with the name include:

- Hadiza Aliyu (born 1989), Nigerian actress and filmmaker
- Hadiza Sabuwa Balarabe (born 1966), Nigerian politician and physician
- Hadiza Bawa-Garba, physician in the Hadiza Bawa-Garba case in England
- Hadiza Blell-Olo (born 1984), Nigerian singer known as Di'Ja
- Hadiza Moussa Gros (born 1960), Nigerien politician
- Hadiza Mailafia, Nigerian politician
- Hadiza Nuhu (born 1965), Nigerian pharmacognosist and professor
- Hadiza Lantana Oboh (1959–1998), Nigerian pilot
- Hadiza Isma El-Rufai (born 1960), Nigerian novelist
- Hadiza Shagari (c. 1940–2021), First Lady of Nigeria
- Hadiza Bala Usman (born 1976), Nigerian politician
- Hadiza Zakari (born 1989), Nigerian weightlifter
