= NBR Hall of Fame =

- Awarded for: honoring and preserving the extraordinary achievements of Nigerians
- Country: Nigeria

NBR Hall of Fame also known as Nigerian Books of Record (NBR) Hall of Fame is an award to honor and preserving the extraordinary achievements of Nigerians who have made significant contributions to the nation's development and has been documented in the Nigerian Books of Record. Founded by Professor David Obongekong David as a comprehensive repository of Nigeria's most remarkable milestones.

The initiative aims to inspire future generations, promote national pride, and ensure the legacies of Nigeria's heroes are immortalized.

The NBR Hall of Fame was established as a key component of the Nigerian Books of Record's. But beyond documenting detailed records, the NBR Hall of Fame was created to exhibit, display and archive the milestone of individuals who have demonstrated exceptional impact, innovation, and leadership in the NBR Hall of Fame Museum.

The induction ceremony are organized by the NBR supreme council, making it a tradition to openly honor Nigeria's most influential figures before an organized assembly in celebrating Nigeria's excellent records in other to drive campaign of the Federal Ministry of Information and National Orientation (Nigeria) and National Orientation Agency (Nigeria), NOA of attitudinal re-orientation.

The NBR Hall of Fame focused on the diverse contributions of Nigerians across all sectors. By celebrating a broad spectrum of achievements, the NBR Hall of Fame is a symbol of Nigeria's resilience, creativity, and global influence.

== Notable Inductees ==
The NBR Hall of Fame has honored Nigerians whose contributions have left an indelible mark on the nation and the world at large. Below are selected notable inductees from previous years:

Winner	Title
Wole Soyinka	Nobel laureate and literary
Ngozi Okonjo-Iweala	First female Director-General of the World Trade Organization and former Nigerian Finance Minister
Chimamanda Ngozi Adichie	Award-winning author of Half of a Yellow Sun and Americanah
Stella Adadevoh	Heroic physician who played a pivotal role in containing the 2014 Ebola outbreak in Nigeria, saving countless lives through her sacrifice
Joe Okei-Odumakin	advocate for democracy and women's rights
Mike Adenuga	Founder of Globacom, recognized for revolutionizing Nigeria's telecommunications industry
Aliko Dangote	Nigerian businessman and industrialist
Abdul Samad Rabiu	Founder of BUA Group, celebrated for his contributions to Nigeria's industrial sector, particularly in cement and sugar
Femi Otedola	Recognized for his resilience in the energy sector with Geregu Power
Tope Awotona	Founder of Calendly, a global tech giant
Adebayo Ogunlesi	leadership of Global Infrastructure Partners, rising from Ondo State to a $1.3 billion fortune on Wall Street
Ademola Adeleke	Osun State Governor
Alex Otti	Governor of Abia State
Olusegun Obasanjo	Former President of Nigeria, recognized for his pivotal role in stabilizing Nigeria's democracy and fostering economic reforms
Allen Onyema	Founder of Air Peace, honored for revolutionizing Nigeria's aviation industry and promoting national connectivity
Folorunso Alakija	Businesswoman and philanthropist, notably through Famfa Oil
Goodluck Jonathan	Former President of Nigeria, inducted for his contributions to democratic governance and peacebuilding
Enoch Adeboye	General Overseer of the Redeemed Christian Church of God, inducted for his transformative spiritual leadership, fostering moral values, and driving philanthropy
