= Anthony Olusesan Araba =

Nigerian jurist

Hon. Justice Anthony Olusesan Araba

Judge of the Customary Court of Appeal, Ogun State
- Incumbent
- Assumed office 8 January 2020
- Appointed by: Dapo Abiodun

Personal details
- Born: November 5, 1968 Ibadan, Oyo State, Nigeria
- Education: Olabisi Onabanjo University (LL.B)
- Occupation: Jurist
- Profession: Judge

Anthony Olusesan Araba (born 5 November 1968) is a Nigerian jurist who serves as a Judge of the Customary Court of Appeal, Ogun State. Before his appointment to the higher bench, he worked as a Magistrate and Deputy Chief Registrar in the Ogun State Judiciary.

== Early life and education ==
Araba was born on 5 November 1968 in Ibadan, Oyo State. He attended Army Children School, Dodan Barracks, Lagos, for his primary education. For his secondary education, he studied at Ijebu-Ode Grammar School, Ijebu-Ode. He later enrolled at the Federal School of Arts and Science, Victoria Island, Lagos, where he obtained his Higher School Certificate.

He studied law at Ogun State University, earning a Bachelor of Laws (LL.B) degree. He attended the Nigerian Law School and was called to the Nigerian Bar in December 1993.

== Career ==
Araba began his legal career during his National Youth Service Corps (NYSC) programme at the law firm of Oditah, Adebiyi & Co. in Lagos Island. He later worked at the law firm of Ajuji, Waziri & Co., also in Lagos.

He joined the Ogun State Judiciary as a Magistrate Grade 1 in June 1999. He served in various magisterial districts across the state and, in 2015, was appointed Deputy Chief Registrar I, a position he held until his elevation to the higher bench.

On 8 January 2020, he was sworn in as a Judge of the Customary Court of Appeal, Ogun State.
