= Philip Oluwasina Akinsinde =

Nigerian jurist

Hon. Justice Philip Oluwasina Akinsinde

Judge of the Customary Court of Appeal, Ogun State
- Incumbent
- Assumed office 21 December 2021
- Appointed by: Dapo Abiodun

Personal details
- Born: 8 June 1962 (age 64) Ifo, Ogun State, Nigeria
- Education: Obafemi Awolowo University (LL.B)
- Occupation: Jurist

Philip Oluwasina Akinsinde (born 8 June 1962) is a Nigerian judge serving on the Customary Court of Appeal, Ogun State. Before his appointment to the bench in 2021, he worked in the Ogun State Ministry of Justice, where he was Director of Civil Litigations and Advisory Services.

== Early life and education ==
Akinsinde was born on 8 June 1962 in Ifo, Ogun State. He attended Baptist Primary School, Idikan, Ibadan, for his primary education and later studied at Baptist Boys’ High School, Saje, Abeokuta.

He briefly worked with the Nigerian Cocoa Board as a clerical officer before enrolling at Ogun State Polytechnic, where he earned a Diploma in Architecture in 1983. He later studied law at the University of Ife (now Obafemi Awolowo University), graduating with a Bachelor of Laws (LL.B) degree in 1989. He was called to the Nigerian Bar on 12 December 1990.

== Career ==
Akinsinde began his legal career during his National Youth Service Corps (NYSC) year at the law firm of R.A. Ogunwole & Co. in Ilorin. After completing his service, he joined the Ogun State Ministry of Justice as a State Counsel.

He spent most of his professional career in the Ministry, where he held various roles before becoming Director of Civil Litigations and Advisory Services.

On 21 December 2021, Akinsinde was sworn in as a Judge of the Customary Court of Appeal, Ogun State, by Governor Dapo Abiodun. He was appointed alongside Justices Olukemi Osisanya and Idowu Odugbesan.
