= Adebisi Olusola Femi-Segun =

Nigerian jurist

Hon. Justice Adebisi Olusola Femi-Segun

President of the Customary Court of Appeal, Ogun State
- Incumbent
- Assumed office May 2024
- Appointed by: Dapo Abiodun

Judge of the Customary Court of Appeal, Ogun State
- In office 8 January 2020 – May 2024

Personal details
- Born: February 17, 1961 (age 65) Lagos State, Nigeria
- Education: Obafemi Awolowo University (LL.B)

Adebisi Olusola Femi-Segun (née Coker; born 17 February 1961) is a Nigerian jurist who currently serves as the President of the Ogun State Customary Court of Appeal.

== Early life and education ==
Adebisi was born on 17 February 1961. She attended Yejide Girls Grammar School, Ibadan, for her secondary education. She proceeded to Abeokuta Grammar School for her A-Levels and got a Bachelor of Laws (LL.B) degree from the University of Ife in 1987. She was called to the Nigerian Bar in 1988.

== Career ==
Adebisi began her legal career at the Federal Ministry of Justice, where she served as a Senior State Counsel in the Department of Public Prosecution from 1989 to 1995. During this period, she also served as an Assistant Legal Adviser on secondment to the Ministry of Petroleum and Mineral Resources.

In 1996, she joined the Lagos State Judiciary as a Magistrate Grade I. She rose through the magistracy ranks to become a Chief Magistrate I. Before leaving the Lagos State Judiciary, she served as the Deputy Chief Registrar (Admin) at the High Court of Lagos State.

On 8 January 2020, she was appointed as a Judge of the Customary Court of Appeal, Ogun State, by Governor Dapo Abiodun. She was one of the pioneer judges appointed of the court.

In May 2024, following the retirement of the pioneer President, Justice Mobolaji Ojo, Adebisi was sworn in as the President of the Ogun State Customary Court of Appeal.
