= Norman Core Macleod =

Scottish bagpiper

Norman MacLeod
- Born: 27 June 1953 (age 72); Glasgow, Scotland
- Other name: Piper Norman
- Occupations: Bagpiper; Petroleum engineer; songwriter; entrepreneur
- Spouse: Josephine Oboh Macleod
- Awards: Yessiey Awards; Colin Ross Trophy; Martin Lowe Trophy; Stewart Bell Trophy; Skeely Piper Trophy
- Musical career
- Genres: Afrobeats; Afro-Celtic music; African traditional beats; Traditional Scottish; Irish folk music
- Instruments: Bagpipes

Norman Core Macleod also known as Norman Macleod (born 27 June 1953 in Glasgow, Scotland) is a Scottish musician who plays the Bagpipes. He created Afro-Celtic music of the bagpipes and was the first foreigner to infuse African traditional beats into the distinctive bagpipe music in Nigeria.

Norman MacLeod won the Martin Lowe Trophy twice for the most outstanding contribution to Lowland and Border piping, the Stewart Bell Trophy, and the Yessiey Awards as bagpiper of the year.

== Early life and education ==
Norman Macleod was born into a family of three children to the late Mr Norman and Mrs Allison MacLeod. He had his early schooling at Milngavie Primary School and Glasgow Academy in Glasgow, Scotland. Norman graduated with a Bachelor's degree in Engineering Science from University of Oxford, England, in 1975 and thereafter he earned his second degree, an MBA in Business Administration, from the University of Edinburgh, Scotland in 1987.

== Career ==
Norman Macleod began his career at Shell International in The Hague, Netherlands, as a graduate management trainee. He was subsequently appointed as the Operations Manager at Shell Nigeria Exploration and Production Company Limited (SNEPCO). In 1994, he played a vital role in the discovery and production of the Bonga Field, which has since become one of Nigeria’s key oil production assets.

In the 1990s, He revolutionized traditional Nigerian music by masterfully blending classical Esan (Edo) and Yoruba rhythms with the distinctive sound of Scottish bagpipes. He became the first-ever European to use the bagpipes to play African music in Nigeria.

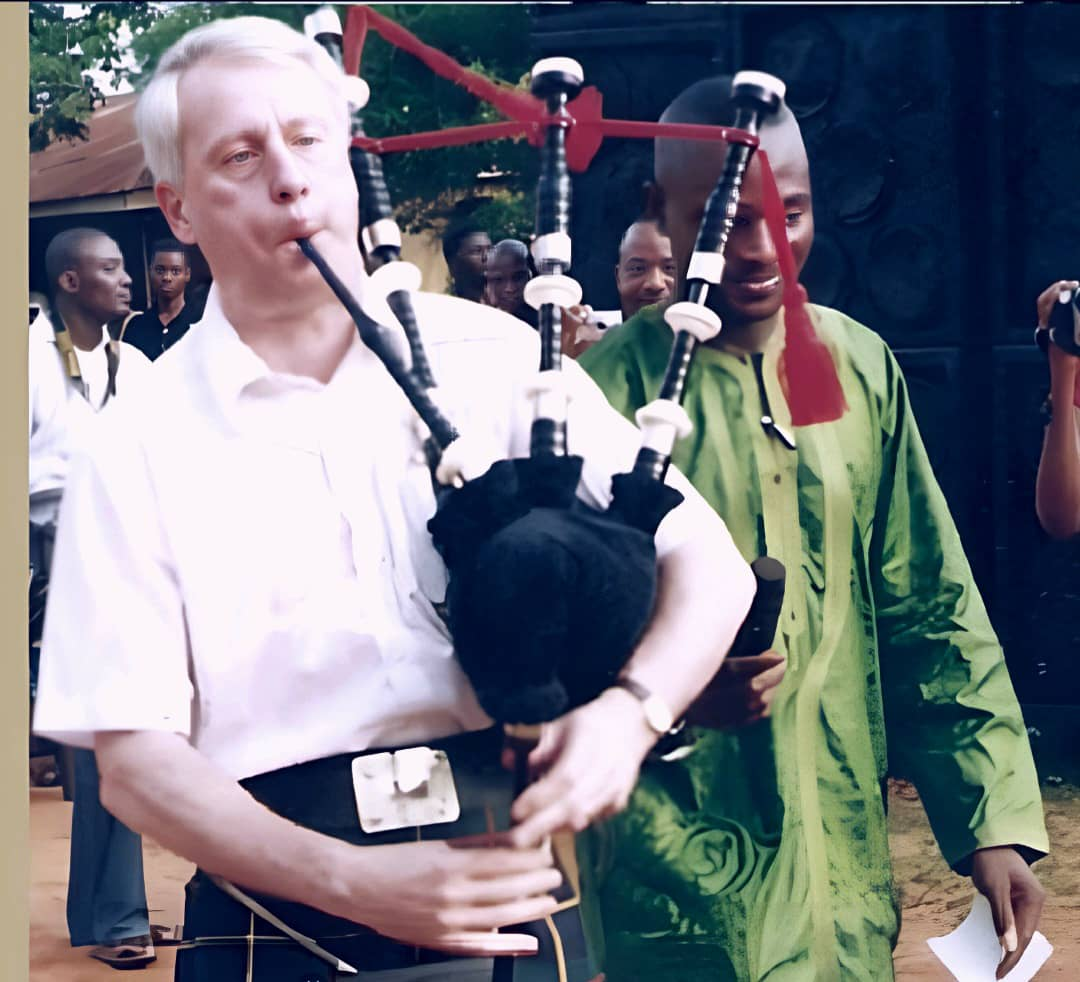
Norman Macleod (Piper Norman) performing in Esan land, Edo State, Nigeria

In 1999, He Collaborated with John Oboh (Jahoha Studios) and Femi Lasode Recording Studios to produce the musical videos of Scottish Essence, African Mood & Step Up Tempo album with performances with Nike Art Centre cultural musicians & dancers.

In 2013, Macleod became the first European to receive an Edo State government certificate honouring his chieftain title as Odion Ukpe of Emu Kingdom, Esan land, Edo State, Nigeria. He also holds a chieftain title as the first Scottish to receive the Omoludun of Ikateland, Elegushi, Lekki, Lagos State, Nigeria.

He pioneered the Afro-Celtic music of the bagpipes and performed with Femi Kuti at the New Afrika Shrine in 2014, honouring the memory of Fela Kuti.

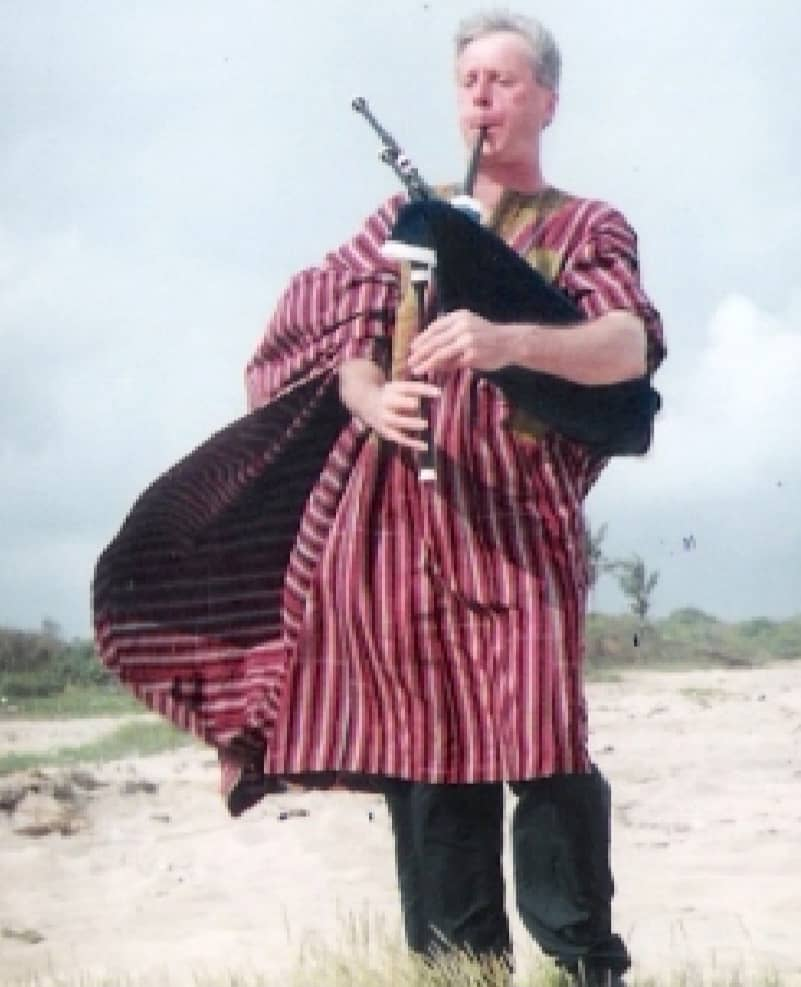
Norman Macleod (Piper Norman) in Lagos

He became the pioneer in bringing bagpipes to the forefront of fashion in Nigeria. His rise to fame came through his involvement with folk bands, where he began to compose music inspired by his travels across Africa and Europe. His exposure to diverse musical traditions, particularly Breton music, Edo samba, and Yoruba drums, enriched his understanding of folklore and significantly influenced his songwriting.

His first CD album, “Scottish Essence, African Mood”, and the second musical CD production “, Step Up Tempo", were produced at John Oboh, aka Mighty Mouse, Jahoha Studios.

== Albums ==
Norman released several albums, including "Scottish Essence, African Mood" (1998), "Step Up Tempo" (1999), and "African Unity" (2005).

== Awards and recognition ==
- Yessiey Award- Artist of the Year 2023 (bagpiper)

At the Lowland and Border Pipers' Society annual competition in 2023, Norman won the following with his Scottish smallpipes:

- Colin Ross Trophy, Open Solo Scottish Smallpipes Competition
- Skeely Piper Trophy, Open Solo General Competition
- Martin Lowe Trophy, for greatest contribution to Lowland and Border music on the day of competition

Highland Bagpipes: Trophy won 2024

- Stewart Bell Trophy, Confined March Competition.

== Personal life ==
He is married to Josephine Oboh Macleod and has two children, Allison Macleod and Norman MacLeod Junior.

== See also ==
List of bagpipers
