= Oluwatobi Oyero =

Nigerian bassist (born 1988)

- Also known as: Toby Williams
- Born: Oluwatobi Oyero; 29 September 1988 (age 37); State, Nigeria
- Genres: Reggae, contemporary gospel, jazz
- Occupations: bassist; band leader
- Instrument: Bass guitar
- Years active: 2013–present
- Education: Olabisi Onabanjo University

Oluwatobi Oyero (born September 29, 1988), also known by his stage name Toby Williams, is a Nigerian-born bassist, and band leader. He is widely known as a bassist on most Nigerian gospel songs, some of which include Gbani Gbani” by Tomisin Ade-Kolawole and “Victory Praise” by Adedoyin Oseni. He has also held live performances with gospel artists, Tim Godfrey, Moses Bliss, and Damilola Bekes.

He emerged Bass Player of the Year at the Eko Heritage Awards 2024.

== Early life and education ==
Oyero hails from a musically inclined family: his father was a bassist, and his Mother and siblings were also singers. Growing up in the Alagbado Baptist Church, he began playing the drums at the age of 14, developing a passion for music. While playing for the same church, He later switched to a bass player developing a foundation in gospel, jazz, and reggae.

In 2013, Oluwatobi took part in a five-day music workshop organized by the Baptist Mission at Bowen University his talent stood out, and he was awarded Best Bass Player.

Oyero attended Success Nursery and Primary School and Ebenezer Comprehensive High School in Lagos. He holds a bachelor's degree in Mechanical Engineering from Olabisi Onabanjo University and a master's degree in marketing from Sheffield Hallam University, United Kingdom.

== Career ==
Oyero began his professional career as a bassist in Nigeria, performing at several concerts before moving to the UK.

Oyero has performed across Nigeria and the United Kingdom, playing at live concerts alongside the likes of Big Bolaji, Tim Godfrey, Tosin Bee, Dare Justified, Moses Bliss, Bukola Bekes, Damilola Bekes, IBK, and others.

He gained widespread recognition in the gospel music scene as the bassist on the following songs: “Gbani Gbani” by Tomisin Ade Kolawole, “Victory Praise” by Adedoyin Oseni, and “Praise Medley” by Praise Ishola. In the United Kingdom, he has performed at LOUD Concert in Sheffield, The Bliss Experience in Manchester and Sheffield and the 2025 Heeley Farm Festival.

Renowned music critics Michael Kolawole and Emmanuel Daraloye have given positive reviews about his playing style.

== Awards and recognition ==
Organizer	Year	Category	Result
Eko Heritage Awards	2024	Bass Player of the Year	Won
Bowen University	2013	Best Bass Player	Won
