= Anjorin =

- Gender: Male
- Language: Yoruba

Origin
- Origin: Nigeria
- Meaning: We walk together
- Region of origin: South West, Nigeria

pronunciation

Ańjọrìn is a male-given Yoruba name commonly used as a surname in Nigeria. It means "We walk together.".

== Notable individuals with the name ==
- Liz Anjorin, Nigerian actress.
- Moucharafou Anjorin, president of the Benin Football Federation.
- Tino Anjorin (born 2001), English footballer.
