= Mabeloboh Center For Save Our Stars =

Nigerian non-governmental organization

MabelOboh Center For Save Our Stars (MOCSOS)
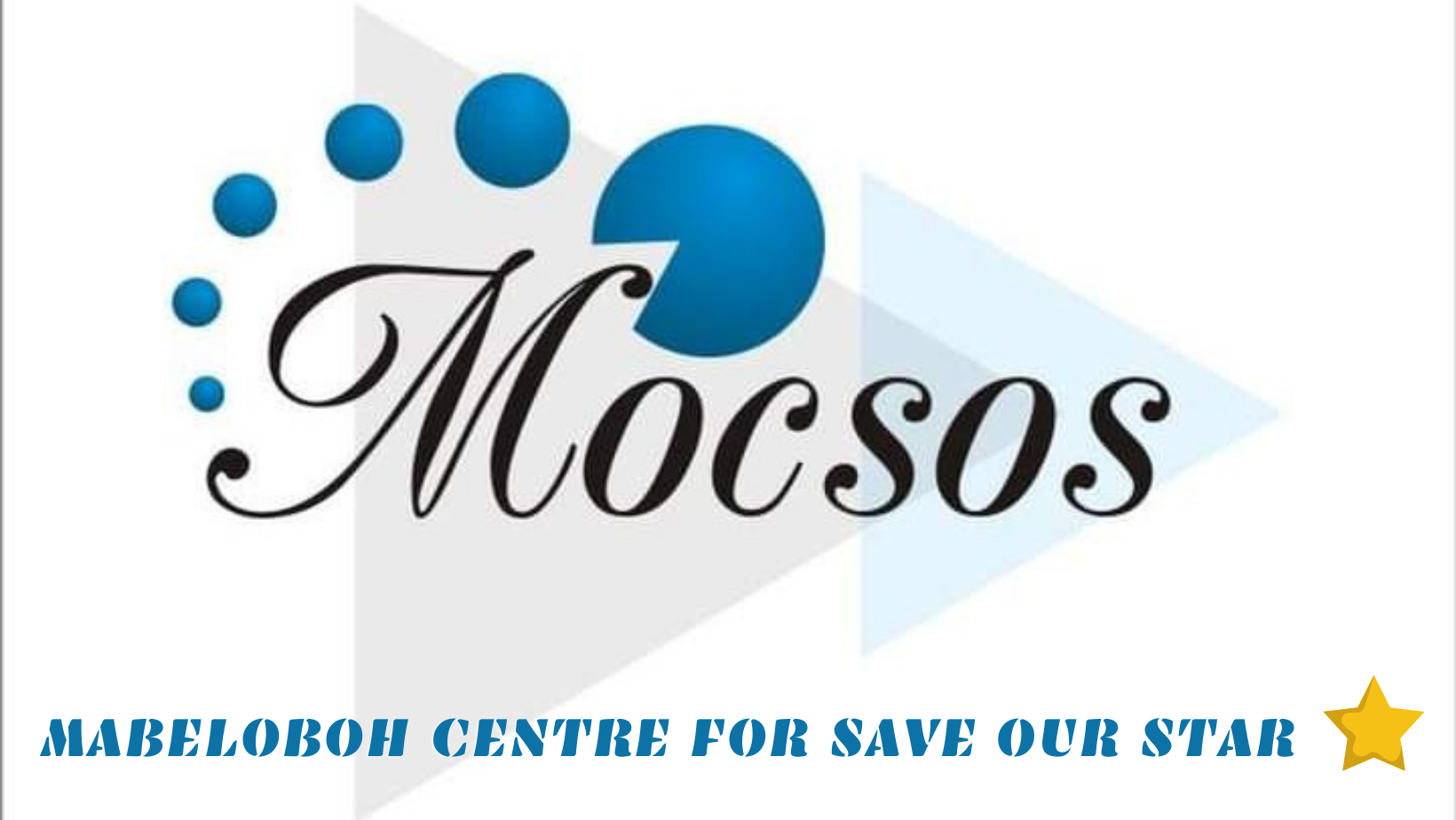
- Founded: 2018
- Type: Nonprofit organization; Non-governmental organization
- Location: Nigeria
- Products: Health Care Scheme, Fundraising, Empowerment, Welfare, Social Activism, Skill Acquisitions
- Key people: Mabel Oboh

MabelOboh Center For Save Our Stars (MOCSOS) is a non-governmental organization headquartered in Lagos, Nigeria. It was established by Mabel Oboh in 2018 to cater for the needs of entertainers that have critical medical conditions and ailments with no means of financial support, and for other less privileged Nigerians.

MOCSOS led the campaign that introduced an affordable and accessible health care scheme MOCSOS health insurance for Nigeria entertainers to reduce the unnecessary rampant deaths of entertainers and to encourage the practice of preventive healthcare.

== History and Activities ==
In 2018, the organization signed a healthcare partnership deal with Ronsberger Nigeria Limited, a health maintenance organization (HMO) Company authorized and regulated by the National Health Insurance Scheme. The healthcare scheme (MOCSOS health insurance) is for entertainers who often go cap in hand to beg for financial assistance whenever they are down with critical ailments.

Baba Fryo served as an ambassador to the NGO. MOCSOS supported and raised funds for celebrities like Lord of Ajasa, Yellow Banton, Sadiq Daba, Danfo Drivers, and others through its health schemes.

The Mabeloboh Center For Save Our Stars (MOCSOS) also initiated advocacy against the killing of displaced Esanland farmers in Edo State, Nigeria by marauding herdsmen.
