= Oluwaseun Olaegbe =

Nigerian singer, songwriter and tech entrepreneur

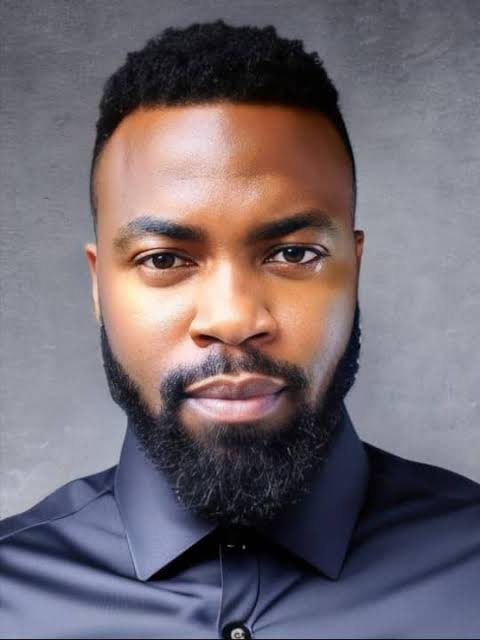
- Born: Ifedayo, Osun State, Nigeria.
- Education: BT in Computer science, Ladoke Akintola University of Technology
- Occupations: Tech entrepreneur, Musician
- Title: CEO Skilzar Digital

Oluwaseun Olaegbe (better known by his stage name Skilzar) is a Nigerian singer, songwriter, tech entrepreneur and tech-startup founder.

Olaegbe was listed as one of the most influential people in the Nigerian entertainment world. He was awarded the Nigerian Books of Record and JOM Charity Award due to his contributions to the ICT and media industry.

== Early life ==
Olaegbe is an indigene of the Ifedayo local government area in Osun State but raised in Lagos. He had his secondary education at Lagos State Model College, Igbonla, Epe before graduating from Ladoke Akintola University of Technology in 2014 with a Bachelor Of Technology degree in computer science. He is a Google Trained Digital Marketing Specialist and a Harvard Trained computer programmer.

== Career ==
Olaegbe is the Founder of Skilzar Digital, a design and advertising agency that created the Yessiey platform and organizes “The Yessiey Awards” to recognize outstanding achievements around the globe.

Olaegbe has worked with GT Da Guitarman, Sugarboy and his song Novacane attracted over 1 million Plays on social media recorded close to 400,000 streams online and was on top chat on Silverbird Rhythm 93.7 FM Lagos.

He is an advocate for technological advancement in Africa and was once listed In the year 2022, as one of the most influential young Nigerians in the Tech and branding industry and was also listed among the most distinguished CEOs to look out for in 2023 by E.O.M business network. He is credited for making brands in Nigeria leverage digital media for advertising and also for his non-profit set-up School The African Child Initiative, which provides micro-scholarships, tech training, and talent placement for African youth.

== Recognition and membership ==
Olaegbe was awarded the Nigerian Books of Record, JOM Charity Award, The Outstanding Personalities (T.O. P) Prize.He is a member of the British Computer Society (BCS) - The Chartered Institute For I.T, and Forbes BLK.
