= Seven (2019 Nigerian film) =

2019 Nigerian film

- Directed by: Tosin Igho
- Produced by: Tosin Igho, Bryan Dike, Ash hamman
- Starring: Efa Iwara; Richard Mofe Damijo; Bimbo Manuel; Daddy Showkey; Patrick Diabuah; Uche Nwaefuna; Sadiq Daba
- Cinematography: Tosin Igho
- Edited by: Bryan Dike, Tosin Igho
- Production companies: Remote Production, Bank of industry, Envivo
- Release date: September 29, 2019
- Running time: 113 min
- Country: Nigeria
- Language: English

Seven is a 2019 Nigerian crime action thriller film directed by Tosin Igho and produced by Tosin Igho and Bryan Dike. The film stars Efa Iwara, Richard Mofe Damijo, Bimbo Manuel, Daddy Showkey, Patrick Diabuah, Uche Nwaefunam, Sadiq Daba. It was released on 29 November 2019 and premiered on Netflix in 2019.

== Synopsis ==
The theme of the film revolves around Kolade after his affluent father passes on. He must survive seven days in the Nigerian neighbourhood of Ajegunle, where obstacles keep him from his inheritance. The movie opens with a doctor checking the brain X-rays of a patient and upon observation, he tells his fellow resident the tumour has spread drastically and there is no cure for the patient that will work, as the cancer is too far gone.

== Cast ==
- Kehinde Ajayi as Male Doctor
- Ogunsanwo Anita as Lawyer's Secretary
- Chiemela Azurunwa as Young Ejiro
- Sadiq Daba as Issah
- Nicholas Diabuah as Prince
- Patrick Diabuah as Bassey
- Bryan Dike as Emeka
- Femi Durojaiye as Mr. Bryan
- Jeremiah Edisemi as Customer in Mamaput
- Edgar Eriakha as Tega
- Aaron Igho as Haruna
- Chris Iheuwa as Commissioner Hassan
- Efa Iwara as Kolade
- Bimbo Manuel as Mr. Tayo
- Salami Bela Maureen as Hadiza's Friend
- Richard Mofe-Damijo as Ejiro
- Uche Nwaefuna as Efe
- Nene Nwanyo as Rose
- Nkeiru Nwaobiala as Kolade's Mother
- Chioma Nwosu as Mamaput Owner
- Tomi Odunsi as Wando
- Evaezi Ogoro as Dr. Aisha
- Gregory Ojefua as Sammir
- Blessing Omori as Mamaput Assistant
- Temitope Onayemi as Hadiza
- Daddy Showkey as Croaker
- Koffi Tha Guru as Tosin
- Uzikwendu as Undu
- Tony White as Felix
