= Ganiyu Olatunji Olatunde =

Nigerian academic (b. 1956)

- Born: 1956 (age 69–70); Lagos state
- Citizenship: Nigeria
- Education: University of Lagos
- Occupation: Lecturer

Ganiyu Olatunji Olatunde was the immediate past vice chancellor of Olabisi Onabanjo University, Ago Iwoye Ogun State. His tenure started in May 2017 and ended in October 2022. Professor Ayodeji Agboola succeeded Professor Ganiyu Olatunji Olatunde as the new chancellor of Olabisi Onabanjo University.

== Early life and education ==
Ganiyu Olatunde Olatunji was born in 1956 in Ikenne, Ogun State. He achieved a Bachelor of Science degree in zoology and graduated with Second Class Upper Division from the University of Lagos (UNILAG). He also holds a master's degree in Agricultural Biology and a Doctorate Degree in Agriculture, both from the University of Ibadan.

== Appointments ==
Olatunde had been a research officer with the Nigerian Stored Products Research Institute Lagos, and research fellow with the International Institute of Tropical Agriculture (IITA), Ibadan before joining the services of the Federal University of Agriculture, Abeokuta, Ogun State, where he was for 20 years before being appointed by the Osun State University, Osogbo, Osun State. He has served in various committees of Senate and Councils of Universities. He was onetime acting head of department, deputy dean, chairman of Academic Staff Union of universities (ASUU), Federal University of Agriculture, Abeokuta Branch, zonal coordinator of Ibadan Zone of ASUU, coordinator, Student Industrial Work Experience (SIWES), director of academic planning, deputy vice chancellor and acting vice chancellor. On October 24, 2013, he was appointed as a chief of staff by then Ogun State Governor

== Professional training ==
Olatunde has been involved in a series of professional training courses abroad, and also many Management and Leadership Trainings, both at home and abroad. Some of which are:

1. Creative Leadership For Total Transformation of African Tertiary Institutions, conducted by the University of Stellenbosch Business School, University of Stellenbosch, Stellenbosch, South Africa in 2010;
2. Enhancing the Quality of Teaching, Research and Administration in Nigerian Tertiary Institutions, conducted by Brunel Business School, Brunel University, West London, UK in 2011;
3. Establishing and Sustaining Entrepreneurship Centres in Nigerian Tertiary Institutions, conducted by the University of Wolverhampton, Midland, UK in 2012;
4. The International Collaborations and Partnerships For Higher Education Growth and Development, conducted by Brunel University, West London, UK in 2013;
5. Transformational Changes In Higher Education: Positioning Your Institution For Future Success, Conducted by Harvard University, Boston, USA in 2014.

== His works ==
Ganiyu Olatunji Olatunde is published in international and national journals, with over 45 publications.
