= Dekunle Okunrinboye =

Nigerian entrepreneur

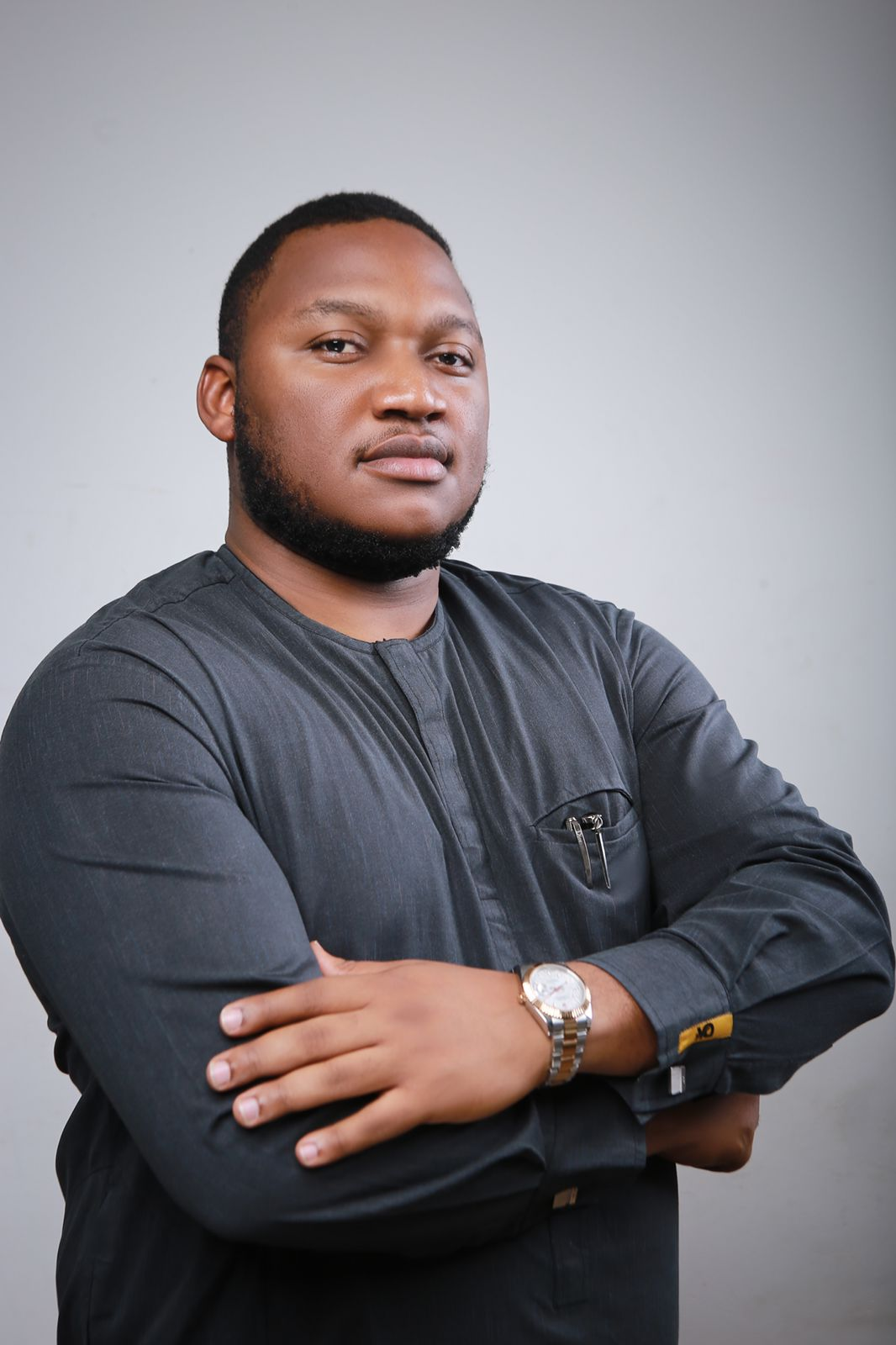
- Dekunle Okunrinboye
- Born: 17 July 1995 (age 31)
- Education: Babcock University
- Known for: Co-founder DK Industries Group

Dekunle Remi Jr. Okunrinboye (born 17 July 1995) is a Nigerian businessman and industrialist. He currently serves as the co-founder and CEO of DK Industries Group. He was at one-time Nigeria's largest exporter of cocoa and the 2020 winner of Young Entrepreneur of the Year award by the Ondo State government.

== Education ==
Okunrinboye was born in Akure, Ondo State, Nigeria, into the family of Senator Oluremi Okunrinboye.He holds a bachelor's degree in business administration and marketing from Babcock University in Ogun State and a leadership excellence certificate in Ascot, England.

== Career ==
Okunrinboye is an executive at JOFEC Group and co-founder of DK Industries Group, established as a haulage business in 2015, after resigning from his previous company Team of Dedicated Achievers LTD (TODA).

He is recognised for his contribution in cocoa exports and at one point he was largest exporter of quality cocoa in Nigeria.

In 2020, the Ondo State government awarded Okunrinboye Young Entrepreneur of the Year for his contributions to the state and in 2023, he was awarded Most Promising Entrepreneur by Babcock University.

In 2023, He was honored as “Man of the Year” at Yessiey Award
