= Sadiq Daba =

Nigerian actor (died 2021)

- Born: Sadiq Abubakar Daba; Nigeria
- Died: 3 March 2021; Ikeja, Lagos State, Nigeria
- Education: Ahmadu Bello University
- Occupation: Actor
- Awards: Africa Movie Academy Award for Best Actor

Sadiq Abubakar Daba (1951/52 – 3 March 2021) was a Nigerian actor and broadcaster. In 2015, he won the Africa Movie Academy Award for Best Actor for his role as "Inspector Waziri" in October 1.

== Education ==
Daba had his secondary education at St. Edward's Secondary School. He got higher degrees in many institutions including Ahmadu Bello University in Zaria.

== Career ==
Daba has worked as a broadcaster for Nigerian Television Authority. His acting career came to prominence in the late 1970s with his starring in Cockcrow at Dawn.

In 2018 he was given the title "Garkuwan Nollywood" (when translated from Hausa language it means "Shield of Nollywood") by the stakeholders in the industry.

== Filmography ==
=== Feature films ===
- October 1 (2014) as Inspector Danladi Waziri
- Seven (2019) as Issah
- Citation (2020) as Professor Yahaya
- Eyimofe (2020) as Jakpor
- Eagle Wings (2021) as President of Nigeria

=== TV series ===
- Hotel Majestic (2015)

== Sickness and death ==
Daba announced his diagnosis of leukemia and prostate cancer in 2017 and was supported with fundraising by several Nigerians including Josephine Obiajulu Odumakin, Mabeloboh Center For Save Our Stars (MOCSOS). On 3 February 2018, Daba joined Project Pink Blue to walk against cancer to commemorate World Cancer Day.

He died on 3 March 2021 at the Lagos State University Teaching Hospital in Ikeja, Lagos. His last movie appearance was in Eagle Wings, in 2021.

== See also ==
- List of Nigerian film producers
