= Jom Charity =

Charity Organization

JOM Charity
- Josephine Oboh Macleod Charity
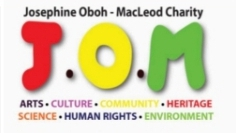
- Abbreviation: JOM Charity
- Registration no.: SC048839
- Location: Scotland, United Kingdom
- Key people: Josephine Oboh Macleod (Founder)
- Website: jomcharity.com

Jom Charity (Scio) is a Scotland, United Kingdom registered charity. The stated aim is improving humanity through art, culture, fair-trade, community, heritage, science, human rights, and environment, and also building stronger relationships between African, Scottish, BAME (black, Asian and minority ethnic) and other communities in Scotland through its charitable activities.

The charity initiated the use of arts and entertainment to promote well-being in United Kingdom communities and is also the only Charitable organizations in Scotland to create inter-relationship between the African, Scottish and other communities, using artistry.

JOM Charity also leads in the advocacy against the killing of Esanland farmers in Edo State, Nigeria by marauder killers headsmen.

== History and activities ==
Josephine Oboh Macleod charity (SCIO) SC048839, also known as JOM Charity, was founded by Josephine Oboh Macleod. It uses arts, craft, design, culture, heritage and entertainment to promote the well-being of communities and raise funds for other charities, organizations and other causes in the United Kingdom and internationally.

Jom Charity activities are funded through donations, National Lottery Community Fund, and Museums Galleries Scotland amongst other funders.

The charity's donation of traditional clothing of Esanland, Edo, Nigeria are being exhibited in Auld Kirk Museum Scotland called 'Igbu'.

Jom Charity is estimated to have supported about 60,000 - 100,000 people in the United Kingdom and across the world with community well-being through the use of art and tourism.
