= Ayodeji Agboola =

Nigerian academic

Ayodeji Johnson Agboola

11th Olabisi Onabanjo University
- Incumbent
- Assumed office October 2022
- Preceded by: Professor Ganiyu Olatunji Olatunde

Personal details
- Born: Ayodeji Johnson Agboola
- Education: Olabisi Onabanjo University
- Profession: Academic; Educator; Administrator

Ayodeji Johnson Agboola (born 4 July 1970) is a Nigerian professor of Cancer Pathology who became the vice chancellor of the Olabisi Onabanjo University, Ogun state, Nigeria since 2022. He was also the deputy vice-chancellor (academic) until his appointment as the vice-chancellor in 2022. His tenure will last for five years.

== Early life and education ==
Professor Agboola went to University of Nottingham, United Kingdom (UK) and obtained his Master's degree in 2007. He also had his Doctorate Degree in the same University in 2012. His M.B.ch. was in Ogun State.

== Career ==
Prof. Agboola joined the academic staff of the Olabisi Onabanjo University (OOU) in May 2002 as a Lecturer II. He served as the acting Head of Department of Morbid Anatomy and Histopathology from 2005 to 2006, 2008 to 2009 and 2012 to 2017. He rose in rank and became a Professor of Cancer Pathology. He became the Vice-Chancellor of the Olabisi Onabanjo University, Ago-Iwoye, Ogun State and took over from Prof. Ganiyu Olatunde, who served for five years. His appointment was announced by the Registrar and Secretary to the Governing Council of the University, Femi Ogunwomoju. Prof. Agboola's appointment was ratified at the 206th Special Meeting, as the 11th VC of Olabisi Onabanjo University, Ago-Iwoye.

At the university, maiden Tech conference held in March 2026 at the OGD Lecture Theatre of the university with the title - The Next Frontier: Building African Digital Future, the Vice Chancellor Prof. Ayodeji Agboola stated, "we understand that technology is the future, and we will support students with viable projects to turn their ideas into startups." This is in a bid to empower students in technology.

The VC at the 35th Convocation Ceremony of the University in February 2026 made a speech and commended the staff members on distinguishing on "themselves in various fields of academic and administrative leadership across the country and beyond." Again, during the 40th anniversary of the institution in February 2023, the VC stated, "the management would ensure the continued development of the Olabisi Onabanjo University to rank as a World Class citadel of learning, not only in producing quality, refined and employable graduates, but also in research and innovations.

It was recorded that the Vice Chancellor cancelled the two-day off duty, previously granted to non-academic staff which ran for almost one year to enable them cushion the effect of fuel subsidy removal. However, the VC said the policy, "had become counterproductive and was disrupting service delivery across the university." This made the Union to stage a protest and accused the management of harassment, high-handedness, and disregard for staff welfare.

On June 18, 2026, the Vice-Chancellor, Prof. Ayodeji Agboola directed that "a lecture-free day" be observed to commiserate with the death of their student who "lost his life during an armed robbery incident that occurred in Ago-Iwoye in the early hours of Thursday." The management promised to tighten the security and condoled the family of the deceased student and the student community.

== Awards ==
Prof Agboola has many awards. These include: Award from the University of Nottingham Developing Solution in 2006; The British Council Linkages Award in 2012; Recognition for cutting edge in researches and the Global recognition for being part of the International Consortium for Advancing Research on Triple Negative Breast Cancer (CART) with the goal of reducing global cancer health disparity.

== Publications ==
Prof. Agboola has many publication. It was said that he has over 50 publications in peer-reviewed Journals, both locally and internationally. These include:

The Pattern of Malignancies and Associated Factors among Type 2 Diabetes Mellitus Patients in a Tertiary Hospital in Southwest Nigeria. By Ayotunde O Ale, Ayodeji Olayinka Johnson Agboola, Babatunde Adeteru Ayoade and Jane Bakare, published in 2023.

Sociodemographic Disparities in Obesity Prevalence Among Adults Aged 20-59 Years Between 2017 and 2023. By Olayinka J. Agboola, Ryan P. Chang, Madelyn Hurwitz, Erica S. Spatz, Tiffany M. Powell-Wiley, Michael J. Blaha, Garima Sharma, Michael D. Shapiro, and Jared A. Spitz, published in 2025.

Association of metabolic syndrome, inflammation, coronary artery calcium score, and incident cardiovascular disease. By O.J. Agboola, J, Herrin, and E.S. Spatz, published in 2023.

Chagas Disease Prevalence in a Safety-Net Prenatal Clinic in Northern Virginia. By LeBeau, Olivia S. MD; Marcus, Rachel R.; Sharma, Garima; Agboola, Olayinka J.; Hurwitz, Madelyn S.; Mbaidjol-Kabra and Rolel MD, published in 2025.

Postpartum Care Pathway Improves Cardiovascular Health Screening in Women with Hypertensive Disorders of Pregnancy. By Asma Rayani, Madelyn Hurwitz, Ain Shajihan, Jared Spitz, Olayinka J. Agboola, Sharmaine McCoy, Kelly C. Epps, Lily Nedda Dastmalchi, and Garima Sharma, published in 2025.
