= Koffi Idowu Nuel =

Nigerian comedian (born 1977)

- Born: 11 March 1977 (age 49); Nigeria
- Occupation: Comedian

Koffi Ayinde Idowu Nuel professionally known as Koffi, is a Nigerian entertainer, comedian, musician, and actor born on 11 March 1977 to a Togolese Mother and a Nigerian Father from Ibeju-Lekki.

== Early life ==
Koffi was born in Maroko (an old slum in Lagos, where the New Lekki Oniru sits after it was demolished in 1990). He had his elementary education in Lagos, with secondary education at Molusi College in Ijebu Igbo, Ogun state, He studied Chemistry in the University of Lagos.

== Career ==
He joined Theatre 15 in 1998 and trained as a stage actor, dancer, and comedy opening act. His first major television breakthrough was as a feature on the hit comedy campus sitcom "Twilight Zone" popularly referred to as "shake body" where he reinvented the Dauda character. As a standup comic he hosted events regularly about school and opened up before plays ran to a paying student audience. In 2003, he auditioned for the famous Nigerian comedy event "Night of a thousand laughs" where he got chosen as one of the four qualifiers to perform at the annual concert from a total of thirty-four talents. He also delivers in his native Yoruba language.

== Filmography ==
- Seven (2019 Nigerian film)

== Awards ==
Year	Awards	Categories
2006	Nigerian National Comedy Awards	Best Comedian (Music)
2007	Dynamix youth Awards	Comedian of the year
2008	Nigerian Music Video Awards	Best use of animation
2008	Titbits News Awards	Most friendly Comedian
2009	-Eminent Achievers Awards (News of The people)	Entertainment personality of the year
2010	Rubbies Ink Project Capable	Capable Youth Ambassador
2011	CEPAN Africa	African Comedy Icon
2012	Exceptional Magazine Awards	Award of excellence as Most creative Comedian
2013	Wed Awards	Best Wedding MC
2013	National Association of Nigerian Students	Award of Excellence
2013	Meister FPY Awards	Award of Recognition
2013	The Nanny (Best of Nollywood Awards)	Best Comic movie
2013	The Nanny(Abuja Int'l Film Festival)	Most outstanding Comic Movie

== Discography ==
- COMfussion (2004)
- ABINIBILITY (2006)
- TRADofunkHIPsouL (2008)
- Workerman movement: all eyes open (2010)
- Root&roll: books1&2 (2012)
- Gospel truth (2012)
- Workerman allstars: famous five (2013)
- Ayindeokin: metamorpho (ajala movie sdtrk) (2014)
- Ayindeokin: fresh from the past (2013)
- Motor music (2012)
- 2 Black Birds movie soundtrack (2007)
- Mumu movie soundtrack (2009)
