= Tosin Igho =

Nigerian film director

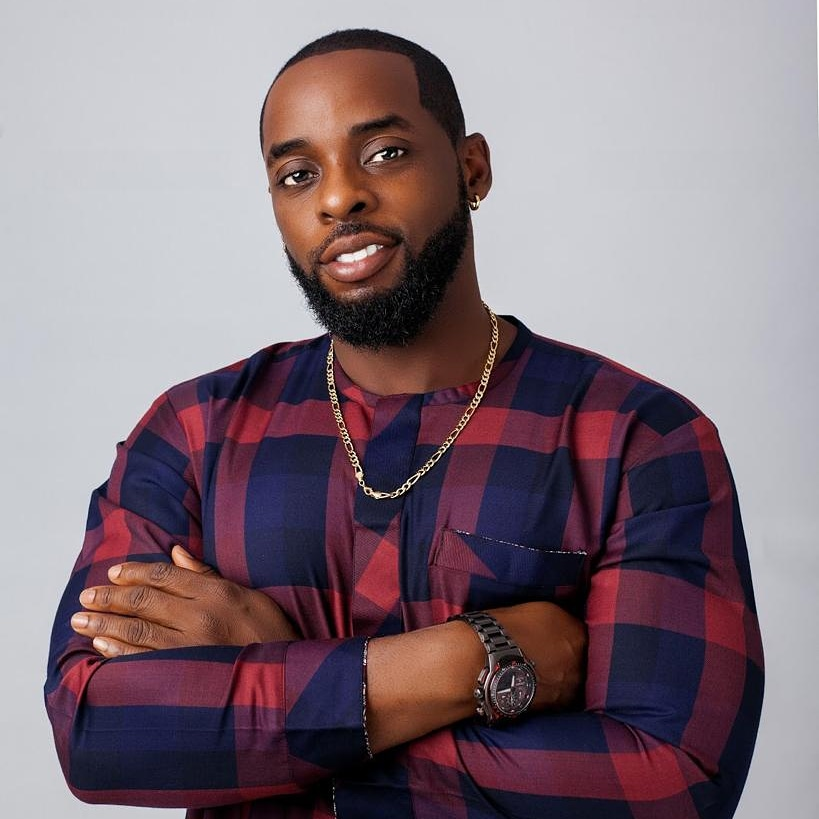
- Citizenship: Nigerian
- Education: AFDA, The School of motion picture medium
- Occupation: Film director
- Known for: Seven (2019 Nigerian film) The Even. Nneka the pretty serpent 2020
- Parent: Peter Igho
- Awards: Africa Magic Viewers Choice Award Winner

Tosin Igho is a Nigerian producer and film director.

== Life and career ==
Tosin is the son of NTA veteran Peter Igho. He obtained his first degree in Visual Effects from the prestigious AFDA in Cape Town, South Africa and received another bachelor's degree in the motion picture medium. He started his career as a musician and then directed music videos. He has directed music videos for famous musicians such as Mo' Hits Records' D'banj, Terry G, Faze, Yung L, Aramide and Sammie Okposo.

== Filmography ==
He is an executive producer with hit tv shows like Once Upon A Time, Judging Matters, Love Come Back (2020-2022), I am Laycon.

He was the director of the film Seven (2019), Suspicion (2024 film)
