= Yinka Odumakin =

Nigerian human rights activist (1966–2021)

Peter Oluyinka Odumakin
- Born: 10 December 1966; Moro, Ife North, Osun State, Nigeria
- Died: 3 April 2021 (aged 54); Lagos State University Teaching Hospital
- Education: Obafemi Awolowo University, University of Ghana
- Occupations: human rights activist and politician
- Spouse: Joe Okei-Odumakin (m. 1997)

Yinka Odumakin (10 December 1966 – 3 April 2021) was a Nigerian human rights activist and politician. Until his death, he was the national publicity secretary of Afenifere, a Pan-Yoruba socio-cultural group.

== Early life and education ==
Odumakin attended St. Augustine Primary School, Ondo State, before proceeding to CAC Grammar School, Edunabon, Osun State and then Oduduwa College, Ile-Ife, Osun State. He graduated from Obafemi Awolowo University in 1989 with a Bachelor of Arts degree in English Studies, and also graduated from University of Ghana.

== Career ==
Odumakin played a key role in the National Democratic Coalition (NADECO) that fought the government of Sani Abacha after the annulment of the 1993 Nigerian presidential election. He was among the spokespersons of the Southern and Middle Belt Leader's Forum (SMBLF). He was the spokesman of Muhammadu Buhari when he contested the 2011 Nigerian presidential election under the defunct Congress for Progressive Change. In 2014, during the government of Goodluck Jonathan, Odumakin and his wife were the only married couple among the 492-member 2014 National Conference which was held in Abuja, Nigeria. He was also a known critic of Muhammadu Buhari's government.

== Personal life ==
Odumakin hailed from Moro, Ife North, Osun State, Nigeria. During the government of Sani Abacha, he met his wife Joe Okei-Odumakin at a detention facility in Alagbon, after she was transferred from Ilorin, Kwara State, Nigeria, due to her involvement in pro-democracy campaigns. They married on 4 November 1997.

== Death ==
Odumakin died from respiratory issues due to complications resulting from COVID-19 at Lagos State University Teaching Hospital on 3 April 2021.
