= Suspicion (2024 film) =

2024 Nigerian film

- Directed by: Tosin Igho
- Written by: Tosin Igho
- Story by: Tosin Igho
- Produced by: Tosin Igho
- Starring: Stan Nze; Omowumi Dada; Uzor Arukwe; Tina Mba
- Release date: 28 November 2024
- Country: Nigeria

Suspicion is a 2024 Nigerian action thriller film directed by Tosin Igho. It stars Stan Nze, Uzor Arukwe, Omowunmi Dada, Tina Mba, and Shaffy Bello. The film was released on Amazon Prime Video on 28 November 2024 and serves as a sequel to The Suspicious Guy (2008). Suspicion tells the story of a simple man born into the black magic world who is on the hunt for vengeance following the murder of his best friend and her daughter and whose journey is met with betrayal from the people he trusts.

== Synopsis ==
Voke, a simple man, witnesses the abduction of his goddaughter, Lolu, the daughter of his best friend. Several attempts to save Lolu proved abortive and after some time they discovered Lolu's lifeless body with her eyes removed. This got Voke angry and he sought vengeance by visiting his mother, who is into black magic and occultic practices. Voke soon uses the black magic powers to uncover a series of related murders connected to Lolu's death. As he gets close to finding answers, he becomes the target of an assassin group and faces betrayal from the people he trusts.

== Selected cast ==
- Stan Nze as Voke
- Omowunmi Dada as Chisom
- Uzor Arukwe as Rogba
- Tina Mba as Obatere
- Richard Mofe-Damijo as Mr Peter
- Shaffy Bello as Madam Atinuke
- Kalu Ikeagwu as Tony

== Awards and nominations ==
2025 AMVCA
Year	Award	Category	Result	Receipient	Ref
2025	Africa Magic Viewers' Choice Awards	Best Supporting Actress	Nominated	Tina Mba	
2025	Africa Magic Viewers' Choice Awards	Best Supporting Actor	Nominated	Uzor Arukwe	
2025	Africa Magic Viewers' Choice Awards	Best Lead Actor	Nominated	Stan Nze	
