= Live 8 concert, Johannesburg =

Live 8 concerts and line-ups

On 2 July 2005, a Live 8 concert was held at Mary Fitzgerald Square, Newtown, Johannesburg, South Africa.

The event is also referred to as "Live 8 Johannesburg", "Live 8 Jo'burg", and "Live 8 South Africa".

A speech was given by former South African president Nelson Mandela, who was received with a 5-minute standing ovation by the audience.

== Lineup and running order ==
- Nelson Mandela (Host) (JB 12:00)
- Jabu Khanyile & Bayete (JB 12:25)
- Lindiwe (JB 13:15)
- Lucky Dube - "Feel Irie" (JB 13:55)
- Mahotella Queens (JB 14:35)
- Malaika - "Destiny" (JB 15:15)
- Orchestra Baobab - Medley (JB 15:45)
- Oumou Sangaré (JB 16:15)
- Zola (JB 16:50)
- Vusi Mahlasela - "When You Come Back" (JB 17:20)

The show was produced by Brad Holmes of the Bassline Club, Gareth Simpson of Oxfam and Melanie Anstey. Artist booking was conducted by Antos Stella and broadcast producer was Pam Deveraux (Deveraux Harris).
