= Josephine Oboh Macleod =

British gallery owner

Josephine Oboh-MacLeod
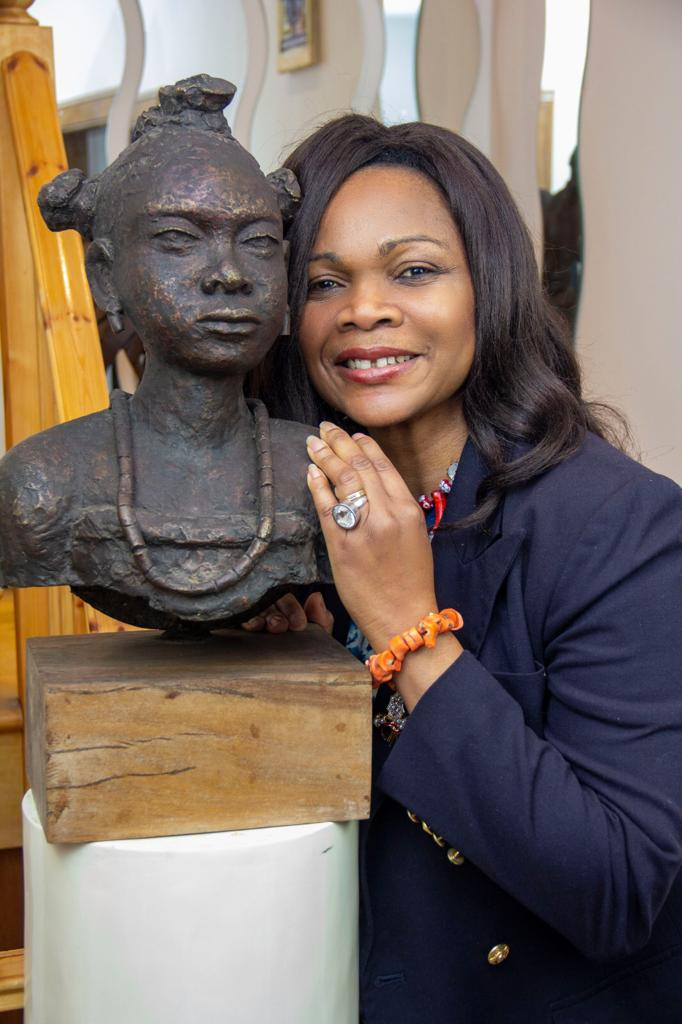
- Chief Josephine Oboh-MacLeod
- Born: Esan South East, Edo State, Nigeria
- Known for: Artist, Painting, Sculpting, Photography & Design
- Spouse: Norman MacLeod
- Website: www.johfrimartanddesign.com

Chief Josephine Oboh-MacLeod is a gallery owner in the United Kingdom. She is the first to stage an Afro-Celtic cultural show in Nigeria, at Fela Kuti New Afrika Shrine.

== Early life ==
Oboh-MacLeod was born into the family of Chief Major Humphrey Etafo Oboh. She is a sister to broadcaster/politician Mabel Oboh and Peter Oboh, the light former WBA/ British light heavyweight champion. She is married to Norman Macleod (Piper Norman).

She studied at Government College, Ojo, Lagos, Newman Prep School, Boston, and earned a degree in hospitality at Newbury College, and a master's degree in Business Administration at University of Surrey. She studied art at London Art College, UK; interior/garden design at KLC School of Design, Chelsea Harbour, UK; and photography at Calumet Photography and Jessop Academy, UK. Epson Master Printing Course.

== Art career ==
Oboh-Macleod has over 6,000 collections with forty years of being in the art world. She is the artistic director at Johfrim Art and Design (art exhibitor and seller) based in Milngavie, which hosts cross-cultural events and represents work by about 50 artists, approximately 70% of whom are from Africa.

She is the first African to establish an African art gallery, called "Timbuktu", in the UK and the only black African woman who owns an art culture center in Scotland.

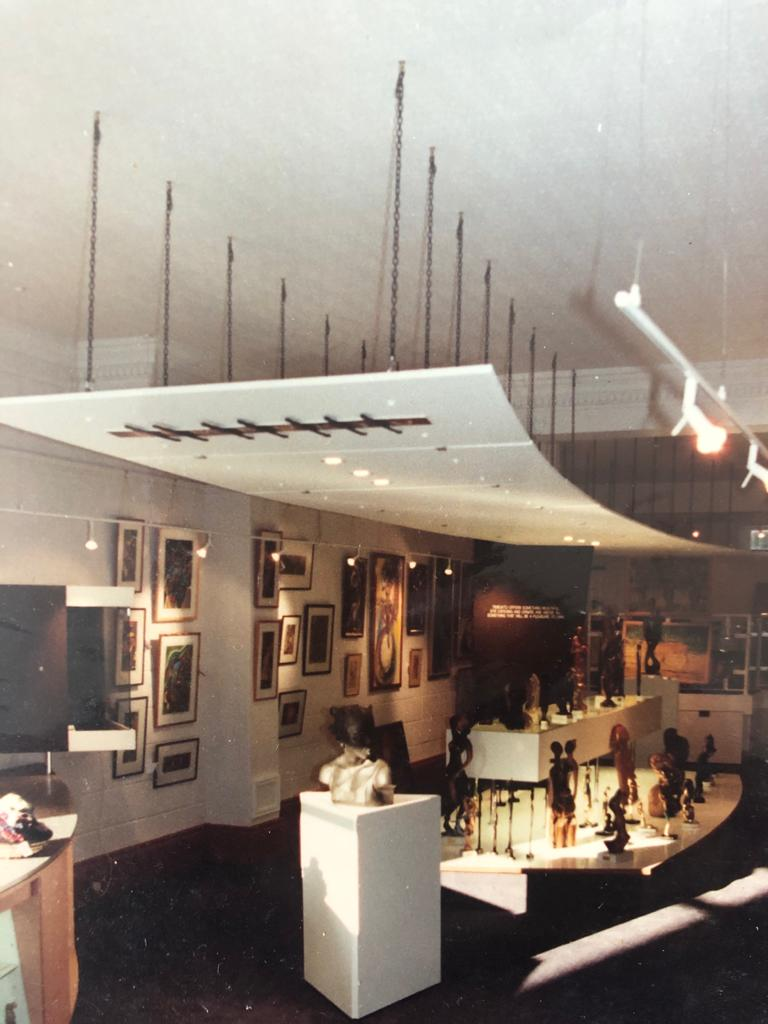
Timbuktu art gallery

Josephine has been part of art Exhibitions and has her works in international private collections such as Nike Art Gallery. She is a member of art groups, including the Society of Nigerian Artists. Milngavie, Bearsden and Dalmuir Art Club, Glasgow, Scotland, UK. She is the founder/ trustee of Jom Charity, JOM Charity Award, Scottish charity board approved. Her charity and humanitarian work reaches her homeland of Nigeria, where she makes donations to the less privileged. She is a recipient of Nigeria Books Of Record award

== Politics ==
She is a United Kingdom politician and a member of The Scottish Conservative Party and a member of Black Tories who advocating the inclusion of more qualified black people in public positions such as parliament across the UK, especially in Scotland.

She was the secretary to Scottish Conservative Friends Of Black, Asian and Minority Ethnic (SCBAME).

Oboh-Macleod contested for councillorship election in Kirkintilloch East, North and Twechar in 2022 under Scottish Conservatives and Unionist Party.

She is the first woman of African descent to contest as the Scottish Conservative and Unionist Party's councillorship candidate in East Dunbartonshire, Scotland, United Kingdom.

In May 2025, Josephine was selected by the Scottish Conservative and Unionist Party as the MSP candidate for Glasgow Easterhouse and Springburn and also on the Glasgow Regional List in the 2026 Scottish Parliament election which she lost to Scottish National Party, Ivan McKee.

She is an environmentalist and Ambassador for the Conservative Environment Network (CEN), Josephine has championed practical environmental policies. In 2026, she supported green innovation alongside fellow ambassadors at the CEN Ambassador Policy Away Day in Rickmansworth.

== Conservative Friends Of African Scotland ==
In 2022, as the newly Appointed first chairperson of Conservatives Friends of Africa Scotland, UK (CFOAS), an organisation, led by members, seeking to develop a strong meaningful relationship between the Conservative Party, the African community in Scotland and Africa, she signed the Memorandum of understanding (MoU) between Conservative Friends of Africa, (the parent body) represented by Chairman Councillor Michael Gbadebo, and the affiliate Conservative Friends of Africa Scotland (CFofAS).

Conservatives Friends of Africa Scotland held its first ever African exhibition 'Out And About Africa' in 2023, at the Scottish Conservatives Conference 2023 attended by the prime minister of the United Kingdom, Rishi Sunak. The EXHIBITION's purpose was to encourage the integration of Africans into Scottish communities and participation in governance by way of recognizing the complexity of diversity.
