= Project Pink Blue =

Nigerian non-profit organization

- Founded: Started as a NYSC community development project in 2013 by Runcie C. W. Chidebe in Abuja
- Type: Non-profit; NGO
- Headquarters: Abuja, Nigeria
- Location: Nigeria
- Services: Cancer Awareness, Free Cancer Screenings, Patient Navigation, Palliative Care and Advocacy.
- Fields: Health care.
- Founder: Runcie C.W Chidebe
- Website: projectpinkblue.org

Project Pink Blue, registered as Health & Psychological Trust Centre, is a cancer nonprofit engaged in raising cancer awareness, patient navigation, advocacy and free breast and cervical cancer screening for women living in poverty. The organization launched Nigeria's first patient navigation in 2015 and a toll- free telephone centre 08000CANCER in 2016 Project PINK BLUE won the SPARC Metastatic Breast Cancer challenge grant by Union for International Cancer Control and Pfizer Oncology in Lisbon, Portugal.

== History ==
Project Pink Blue started in 2013 as a National Youth Service Corps (NYSC) community development project, known as Project Pink through which Runcie C. W. Chidebe, carried out a breast and cervical cancer awareness and screening for 165 women in Kabusa community, a suburb of Abuja. In 2014, the organization included prostate cancer on her mandate and became known as Project Pink Blue, and was incorporated with Corporate Affairs Commission (CAC) of Nigeria.

The organization has frequently used public figures and celebrities like Korede Bello, Chidinma Ekile, Oge Okoye, Annie Idibia, and others to bring the message about early dictation and treatment to limelight.

== Activities ==
The organization has regularly organized World Cancer Day, International Breast Awareness Day popularly known as Pink October, Community outreaches, Global Day of Citizens Action, Cancer Research. On 29 & 30 September, Project Pink Blue hosted Wiki Loves Women event in Abuja.

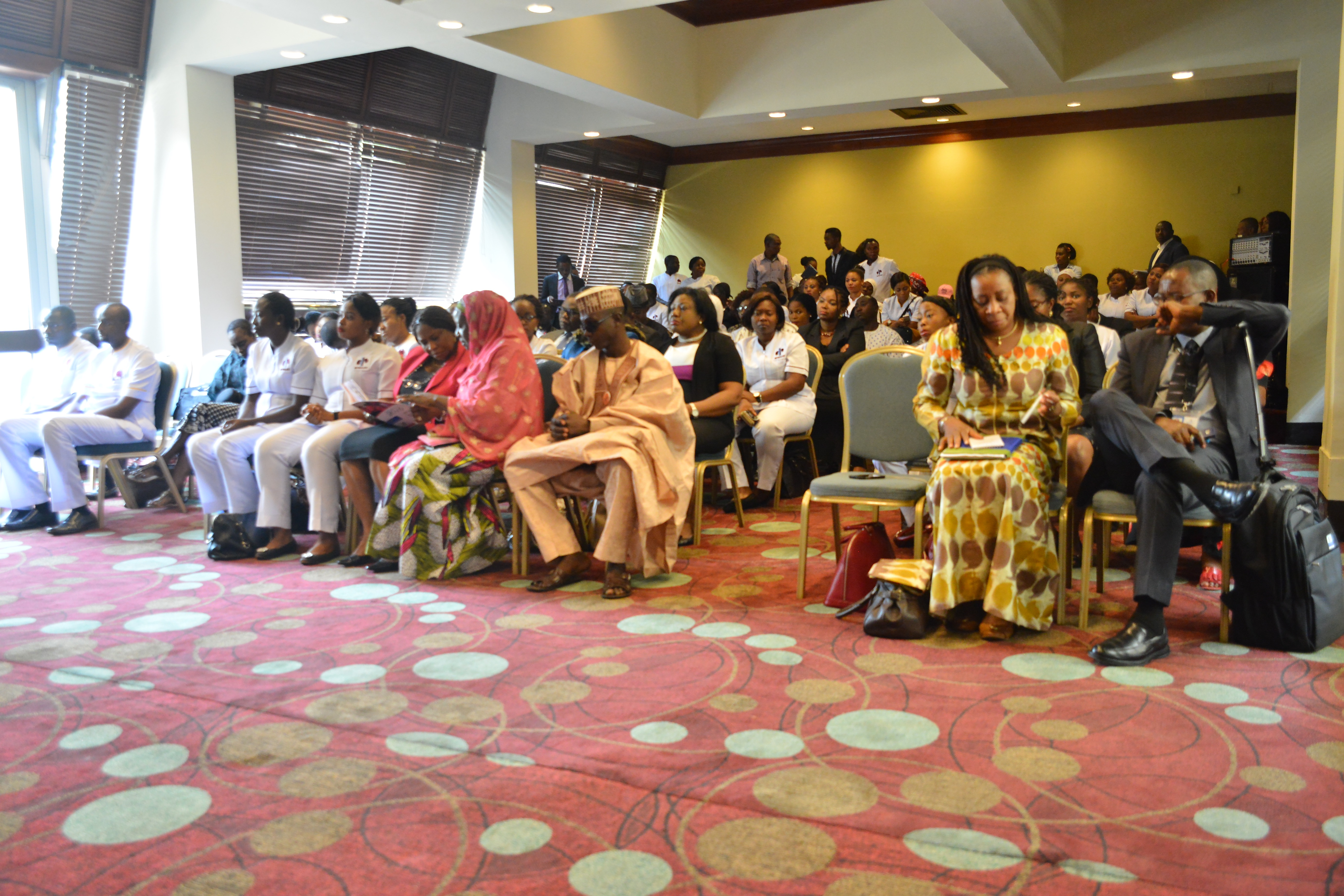
Stakeholders at World Cancer Day 2016 Commemoration event organized by Project PINK BLUE

== BCNPP ==
In January 2015, Project Pink Blue sets up the first Nigerian Patients Navigation programme known as Breast Cancer Navigation and Palliative Programme (BCNPP).

== World cancer day ==
Project Pink Blue organizes world cancer day every February for the past four years. The event featured road walk, free cancer screening and symposium with dignitaries such as a veteran Nigerian broadcaster Sadiq Daba.

== 08000CANCER ==
On 2 December 2016, the organization launched the first Nigerian cancer toll-free line known as 08000CANCER or 08000226237.

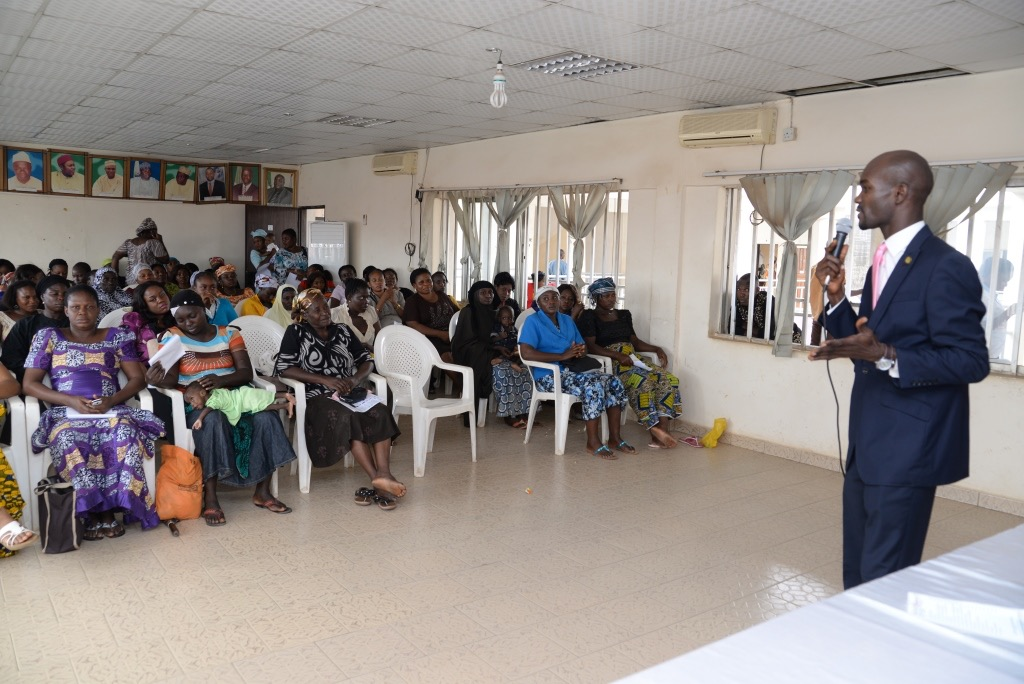
Runcie C.W. Chidebe at Project PINK BLUE Free Breast & Cervical Cancer Screening & Awareness, Kuje, Abuja (6)

== Abuja Breast Cancer Support Group ==
Project PINK BLUE chose the occasion of World Cancer Day to launch the Abuja Breast Cancer Support Group - the city's first patient support group. The milestone achievement was commemorated with a medal-giving ceremony for breast cancer survivors attended by leaders from the cancer control community as well as His Royal Majesty Dr. Kabiru Musa, the Emir of Azara.

== Upgrade Oncology ==
Project PINK BLUE launched the Upgrade Oncology programme during the 2018 World Cancer Day activities. The Upgrade Oncology is a capacity development program focused on improving cancer treatment and care through the provision of medical oncology training, update/top-up trainings, development of medical oncology curriculum, review and domestication of the treatment guidelines for better cancer care in Nigeria.

== Men on Blue ==
Men on Blue is a health intervention focused on breaching the gap of awareness, education and screening for prostate cancer in Nigeria.

== Advocacy ==
Project PINK BLUE also used the Day to call on the Federal government to set up a national agency for cancer control, urging decision-makers to make cancer control a national health priority.

Project Pink Blue has directly impacted 1,235 women and men through screening and enlightened over a million people in Africa through Radio, Television and Social Media campaign. Besides awareness campaigns, the group supports cancer patients through fundraising. It was through one such fundraising event that the NGO raised around 5.5m naira (£14,000) in cash and 9m naira in drug support to enable Comfort Oyayi Daniel to have her chemotherapy when her savings ran out. In November 2017, the nonprofit led some breast cancer patients and survivors to Nigeria's National Health Insurance Scheme (NHIS) to advocate for the expansion of insurance coverage for cancer drugs and services.

== Grants and awards ==
- Nelson Mandela-Graca Machel Innovation Award, 2014
- SPARC MBC Challenge Award, Lisbon Portugal

== Partnerships ==
The organization has partnered with:

- Federal Ministry of Health, Nigeria
- Union for International Cancer Control (UICC)
- Pfizer Oncology
- Dana Airline
- Premium Times
- Africa Independent Television
- U.S. Embassy in Nigeria
- Jumia
- ACT Foundation
- farmpays

== Affiliations ==
Project Pink Blue is a member of Union for International Cancer Control, Geneva, Switzerland; partner to Federal Ministry of Health in Nigeria; voting member, CIVICUS World Alliance for Citizen Participation, Johannesburg, South Africa; Member of the World Health Organization's Partnership for Maternal, Newborn & Child Health.
