= Colbert Mukwevho =

South African musician

- Born: Colbert Rudzani Mukwevho; 26 October 1965; Limpopo, South Africa
- Other name: Harley
- Occupations: Musician, Composer
- Spouse(s): Juliah Mukwevho (m. 1985; died 2020)
- Musical career
- Genre: Reggae
- Instruments: Guitar, vocals, keyboard
- Years active: 1975–present
- Label: Ngoma dza Tshitomboni
- Formerly of: The Thrilling Artists

Dr Colbert Rudzani Mukwevho (born 26 October 1965) is a South African reggae musician and producer and a father to notable artist Percy P.postman Mukwevho. Mukwevho was granted an honorary doctorate of philosophy in Arts and Social Sciences by the University of Venda. This is how he came to be called Dr. Mukwevho.

== Life ==
Mukwevho was born in South Africa, Limpopo province, in 1965.He moved from the former homeland of Gazankulu to the Venda region under the Group Areas Act which was introduced by the Apartheid Government.

His wife, Ms Juliah Mukwevho, died at Siloam Hospital after a short illness in 2020, where the Executive Mayor of Vhembe District Municipality, Cllr Dowelani Nenguda paid a visit to the family after hearing the news.

== Music career ==
=== 1975–1983: The Thrilling Artists ===
Mukwevho began his music career in 1975 at the age of ten when he joined his family's band, The Thrilling Artists, founded by his father Abel Mukwevho and uncle. He initially performed as a backing vocalist before later becoming the band's bass guitarist and lead singer. The group combined township jive with Venda and Shangaan musical influences and became one of the prominent local bands in the Venda region.

During his time with the group, Mukwevho contributed to recordings including Mukhada O Ntshuma (1979), Hani-Hani (1982), and Ha Nga Dzuli, which incorporated reggae influences. Through performances and recordings with Radio Venda, he gained experience as a musician and songwriter while developing an interest in reggae music inspired by artists such as Bob Marley and Peter Tosh.

=== 1983–1988: The Comforters and early reggae development ===
In 1983, Mukwevho left The Thrilling Artists together with members of his family and formed a new group, The Comforters. Seeking greater artistic independence, he began experimenting with the fusion of reggae rhythms and Tshivenda-language lyrics, a style that would become his trademark.

The group's debut album, Month-End Lover, was released in 1986 and established Mukwevho as a leading figure in Venda reggae. During this period he also recorded songs for Radio Venda and expanded his reputation across Limpopo through live performances and regional broadcasts. By the late 1980s, he had become known for adapting reggae music to local cultural themes and indigenous languages.

=== 1989–2000: Harley and the Rasta Family, CCP Records and national success ===
In 1989, Mukwevho relocated to Johannesburg and began working with producer Sello "Chicco" Twala. He adopted the stage name Harley and formed the reggae group Harley and the Rasta Family, signing with CCP Records, a division of EMI South Africa.

The group's debut album, Lion in the Sheepskin (1990), introduced a roots reggae sound infused with Venda cultural themes. Subsequent releases included I Do Love You (1992), Hoyo Wanu Na Naka (1993), and Tshigotsha Nama (1994), helping establish the band within South Africa's reggae scene.

In 1995, the group released the self-titled album Harley and the Rasta Family, which featured the song The Lord Is My Rock. The album won the South African Music Award (SAMA) for Best Reggae Album in 1997, becoming one of the most significant achievements of Mukwevho's career.

During the same period, he collaborated with several prominent South African artists, including Brenda Fassie and Chicco Twala. He also expanded his work as a songwriter and producer while recording music in Tshivenda, Xitsonga and English. His growing reputation led to recording sessions in Jamaica with renowned reggae producers Sly Dunbar and Robbie Shakespeare, further strengthening his connection to the international reggae movement.

=== 2000–2011: Ngoma Dza Tshitomboni and independent production ===
Following his success with CCP Records, Mukwevho increasingly focused on independent music production through his company and label, Ngoma Dza Tshitomboni (NDT). This period marked a transition toward artistic independence and self-production.

Albums released during this era included Muthu Ndi Nne (2000), Doomsday (2001), Tshigotshanama (2007), Mmbwa I Do La Mmbwa (2009), and Save Da Hildren (2011). Many of these recordings addressed social issues including HIV/AIDS, poverty, family conflict, spirituality, and cultural preservation.

Mukwevho became recognized for using reggae music as a platform for education and activism, producing songs that encouraged social awareness while promoting Venda language and culture. His work during this period also contributed to the development of younger musicians from Limpopo through mentorship and studio production.

=== 2011–2016: Rudeboy Entertainment and family collaborations ===
In 2011, Mukwevho began collaborating with Rudeboy Entertainment and increasingly incorporated members of his family into his performances and recordings. His sons, Percy "P. Postman" Mukwevho and Junior Mukwevho, became regular collaborators.

This period culminated in the release of Lion & Son O' Lion, a live recording project featuring Mukwevho performing alongside his sons. The project introduced Junior Mukwevho to a wider audience and showcased a multi-generational approach to reggae music. Mukwevho also revisited earlier material, including new recordings and reinterpretations of songs from his catalogue.

=== 2020–present: Personal loss, continued recording and recognition ===
In May 2020, Mukwevho's wife, Julia Mukwevho, died following a short illness. Julia had been an important member of his musical career, serving as a backing vocalist in his bands alongside members of the Mukwevho family. Despite the loss, he continued recording and performing.

Following the COVID-19 pandemic period, Mukwevho released several singles, including Zion We Come and Ri A Dikona. The latter achieved significant recognition and won the Reggae Song of the Year award at the 2024 Tshima Awards.

In 2024, Mukwevho participated in the One Africa One People Tour and performed alongside Jamaican reggae legend Burning Spear during a major concert at Makhuvha Stadium in Limpopo. The event was regarded as one of the most significant reggae concerts staged in the province.

In 2025, the Limpopo Department of Sport, Arts and Culture honored Mukwevho with a Lifetime Achievement Award in recognition of his contributions to South African music, reggae, and the preservation of Venda cultural heritage.

Over a career spanning more than five decades, Mukwevho has recorded nearly 200 songs and released approximately 20 albums. He is widely regarded as one of the pioneers of Tshivenda reggae and among the most influential reggae musicians in South African music history.

== Discography ==
=== Albums ===
- Gaku La Vhuswa Zwalo - Vhamvumvusi (SABC Transcripts) 1985
- Ni Khou Livha Luwani - Vhamvumvusi (SABC Transcripts) 1984
- Monthend Lover - The Comforters (Hit City Records) 1986
- Lion in the Sheep Skin - Harley and The Rasta Family (CCP Records) 1990
- I Do Nela Rothe - Colbert Mukwevho (NDT Music Publishing) 1992
- Hoyo Wanu O Naka - Colbert Mukwevho (NDT Music Publishing) 1993
- Tshigotshanama - Colbert Mukwevho (NDT Music Publishing) 1994
- Harley and The Rasta Family - Harley and The Rasta Family (CCP Records) 1997, (Best Reggae - SAMA Awards 1997)
- Phanda - Colbert Mukwevho (NDT Music Publishing) 1998
- Why? - Harley and The Rasta Family (CCP Records) 1999
- Muthu Ndi Nne - Colbert Mukwevho (NDT Music Publishing) 2000
- Doomsday - Colbert Mukwevho (NDT Music Publishing) 2001
- Mulovha, Namusi na Matshelo - Colbert Mukwevho (NDT Music Publishing) 2003
- Tshigotshanama (Remastered) - Colbert Mukwevho (NDT Music Publishing) 2005
- Mmbwa I Do La Mmbwa (Ep) - Colbert Mukwevho (NDT Music Publishing) 2007
- Mmbwa I Do La Mmbwa (Full Version) - Colbert Mukwevho and Family (NDT Music Publishing) 2008
- Save Da 'Hildren - Colbert Mukwevho and Family (NDT Music Publishing) 2011
- Lion & Son O'Lion (Live) - Colbert Mukwevho and Family (NDT Music Publishing) 2013
- Doomsday (Remastered) - Colbert Mukwevho and Family (NDT Music Publishing) 2015
- Down But Not Out - Dr. Colbert Mukwevho and Kenny Wailer Murabi (Adziambei Music Academy) 2020, Disaster Relief Project
- Best of Dr. Mukwevho - Dr. Colbert Mukwevho (NDT Music Publishing) 2021
- Ri A Dikona - Dr. Colbert Mukwevho (NDT Music Publishing) 2022
