= Adedoyin Oseni =

Nigerian instrumentalist (born 1994)

- Born: Adedoyin Oseni; 9 August 1994 (age 32); Ogun State, Nigeria
- Genres: gospel, contemporary gospel, worship
- Occupations: Saxophonist; Worship leader
- Instrument: Saxophone
- Years active: 2018–present

Adedoyin Oseni (born August 9, 1994) is a Nigerian-born Afro-contemporary gospel saxophonist and worship leader. He is known for his song "Incense" featuring Theophilus Ogaga and also "Jelenke iLife", which he has performed at several global stages. He won the God's Children Got Talent 2014 edition, created by the Redeemed Christian Church of God (RCCG), He also emerged as Best Gospel Saxophonist Of The Year at the Eko Heritage Awards 2024.

== Background and education ==
Adedoyin hails from Irolu Remo, Ogun State, but he was born in Bariga, Lagos state, Nigeria. He bagged a degree in political science from Olabisi Onabanjo University in 2017 and further proceeded to obtain a master's degree in marketing with brand management from the University of Huddersfield in 2024.

== Career ==
At the age of 20, Adedoyin Oseni emerged as the winner of God's Children Got Talent in 2014, a talent hunt show organized by the Redeemed Christian Church of God for children between the ages of 5-20, where he contested as a saxophonist.

He started his music career professionally in 2018 after a significant personal transformation from Islam to Christianity, a change which he claimed has deeply influenced his musical direction. He came into the limelight following the release of his single "Incense" featuring Theophilus Ogaga, released in 2023. The song has so far gained traction on social media.

He organised the "Evening of Worship" held in Sheffield, United Kingdom. The maiden edition was held at the Redeemed Christian Church of God victory assembly in Sheffield, and it recorded an attendance of 250 persons, the concert was a symphony of genres, with Oseni on saxophone leading the ensemble through an intricate mix of traditional and western gospel tunes. The concert also featured other gospel singers such as Theophilus Ogaga, whose violin captivated the audience and Angela Ohiorenoya whose singing enchanted everyone who listened.

In 2024, Journalist Emmanuel Daraloye stated that the combination of Adedoyin Oseni and Aweni Elewi on the Elu Agogo track might have been what the Nigerian gospel industry has been missing, he described the track as gospel meets poetry.

Michael Kolawole described Oseni's latest tune "Jelenke iLife" as a Soul-Stirring journey of healing, connection, and Upliftment.

== Personal life ==
Adedoyin married Ololade in 2023.

== Awards and recognitions ==
Award	Year	Category	Result	Ref.
Eko Heritage Awards	2024	Best Gospel Saxophonist	Won	

== Discography ==
Song title	Featured artist(s)	Year released
Incense	Theophilus Ogaga	2022
Victory Praise	None	2022
Elu Agogo	None	2022
Devotion	Joshua Banjo	2023
Alagbara	None	2024
Jelenke iLife	None	2024
