= Lucky Dube =

South African reggae musician (1964–2007)

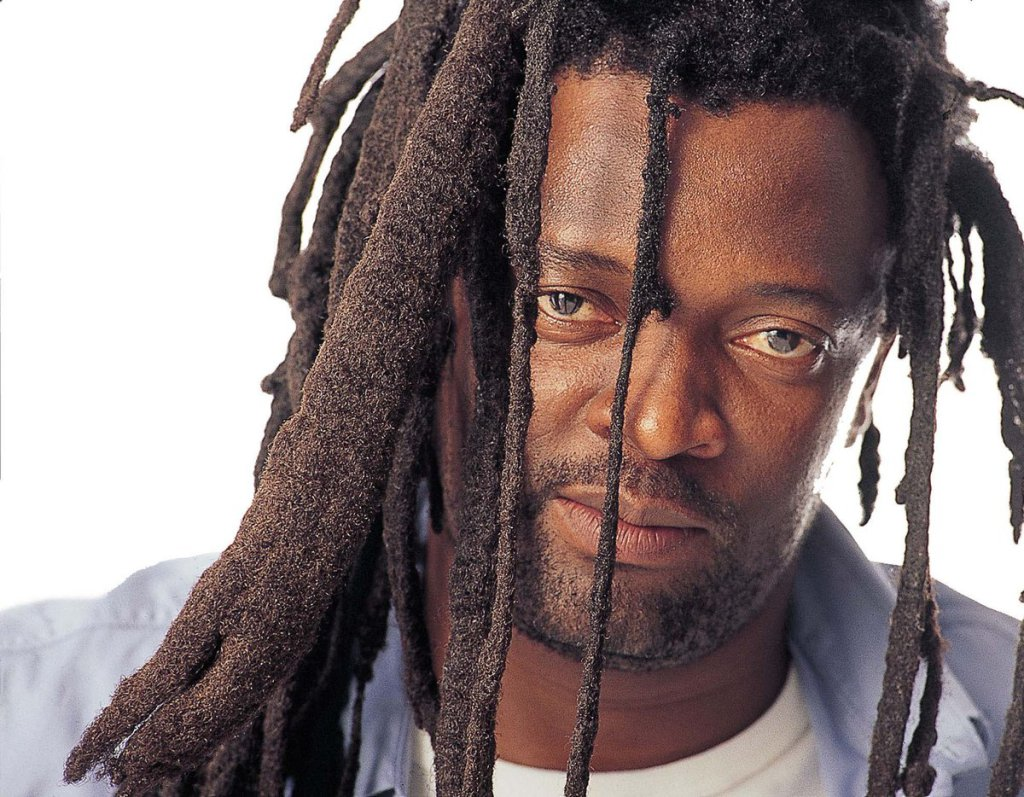
- Lucky Dube

Background information
- Born: Lucky Philip Dube; 3 August 1964; Ermelo, Transvaal (now Mpumalanga), South Africa
- Died: 18 October 2007 (aged 43) Rosettenville, Johannesburg, South Africa
- Occupation: Musician
- Spouse: Thobekile Ngcobo (m. 1989–2007)
- Musical career
- Genres: Reggae; mbaqanga
- Instruments: Guitar; vocals; keyboards
- Years active: 1981–2007
- Labels: Rykodisc; Gallo
- Formerly of: The Skyway Band; The Love Brothers

Lucky Philip Dube (pronounced duu-beh; 3 August 1964 – 18 October 2007) was a South African reggae musician and Rastafarian. His record sales across the world earned him the Best Selling African Musician prize at the 1996 World Music Awards. In his lyrics, Dube discussed issues affecting South Africans and Africans in general to a global audience. He recorded 22 albums in a 25-year period and was Africa's best-selling reggae artist of all time. Dube was murdered in the Johannesburg suburb of Rosettenville on the evening of 18 October 2007.

== Biography ==
=== Early life ===
Lucky Dube was born in Ermelo, Transvaal (now Mpumalanga), on 3 August 1964. His parents separated before his birth, and he was raised by his mother, who named him "Lucky" because she considered his birth fortunate after a number of failed pregnancies. Along with his two siblings, Thandi and Mandla, Dube spent much of his childhood with his grandmother, Sarah, while his mother relocated to work. In a 1999 interview, he described his grandmother as "his greatest love", who "multiplied many things to bring up this responsible individual that I am today".

=== Musical beginnings ===
Dube worked as a gardener in his younger years but later decided to go to school in order to improve his economic prospects. There, he joined a choir and with some friends, formed his first musical ensemble, the Skyway Band. While at school, he discovered the Rastafari movement. At the age of eighteen, Dube joined his cousin's band, the Love Brothers, playing Zulu pop music known as mbaqanga. The band signed with Teal Record Company and recorded the album Lucky Dube and the Supersoul, and Dube began to learn English. In 1986, together with his cousin Richard Siluma, Dube released the Afrikaans album Die Kaapse Dans, followed by the EP Help My Krap, the same year, under the name Oom Hansie.

=== Reggae ===
On the release of his fifth album, Dave Segal (who became Dube's sound engineer) encouraged him to drop the "Supersoul" element of the name. All subsequent albums were recorded as Lucky Dube. Around this time, the singer noticed that fans were responding positively to some reggae songs he played during concerts. Drawing inspiration from Jimmy Cliff and Peter Tosh, he felt the socio-political messages associated with Jamaican reggae were relevant to a South African audience in an institutionally racist society.

He decided to try the new musical genre, and in 1984, released the mini album Rastas Never Die. The record sold poorly—around 4,000 units—in comparison to the 30,000 units his mbaqanga records would sell. Keen to suppress anti-apartheid activism, the regime banned the album in 1985, because of its critical lyrics, such as in the song "War and Crime". Dube was not discouraged, however, and continued to perform the reggae tracks live and wrote and produced a second reggae album, Think About the Children, in 1985. It achieved Platinum sales status and established Dube as a popular reggae artist in South Africa, in addition to attracting attention outside his homeland.

=== Commercial and critical success ===
Dube continued to release commercially successful albums. In 1989, he won four OKTV Awards for Prisoner, one for Captured Live the following year, and another two for House of Exile, the year after. His 1993 album, Victims, sold over one million copies worldwide. In 1995, he earned a worldwide recording contract with Motown. His 1995 album, Trinity, was the first release on Tabu Records after Motown's acquisition of the label.

In 1996, he released the compilation album Serious Reggae Business, which led to him being named the "Best Selling African Recording Artist" at the World Music Awards and the "International Artist of the Year" at the Ghana Music Awards. His next three records each won South African Music Awards. His 2006 album, Respect, earned a European release through a deal with Warner Music. Dube toured internationally, sharing stages with artists such as Sinéad O'Connor, Peter Gabriel, and Sting. He appeared at the 1991 Reggae Sunsplash (uniquely that year, he was invited back onstage for a 25-minute-long encore) and the 2005 Live 8 event in Johannesburg.

In addition to performing music, Dube was a sometime actor, appearing in the feature films Voice in the Dark, Getting Lucky, and Lucky Strikes Back.

Dube took reggae music and used it as a platform to promote racial equality within South Africa during apartheid. He used the musical genre to frame his arguments about colonialism and the African slave trade, and how he felt that Africa should be reclaimed by the black race.

=== Death ===
On 18 October 2007, Lucky Dube was killed by armed robbers in Rosettenville, a Johannesburg suburb, shortly after dropping two of his seven children off at their uncle's house. Dube was driving his Chrysler 300C, which the assailants were after. Police reports suggest he was shot dead by carjackers who did not recognise him; a state witness additionally claimed that he was targeted under the false notion that he was Nigerian. Five men were arrested in connection with the murder; three were tried and found guilty on 31 March 2009. Two of the men attempted to escape and were caught. Dube's convicted killers were sentenced to life in prison.

=== Legacy ===
On 21 October 2008, Rykodisc released a compilation album entitled Retrospective, which featured many of Dube's most influential songs as well as tracks previously not released in the United States. The album celebrated Dube's music and honored the contributions he made to South Africa. The Roots Reggae Library has taken steps to store digital versions of the artist's mbaqanga albums made in the 1980s. Five of the six albums have been retrieved; Ngikwethembe Na has yet to be found.

As one of the first artists to bring African reggae to the mainstream, Dube bridged cultural gaps within the African diaspora. What his music did was "[present] a praxis of cross-culturality and visionary possibility". Dube gave Africa a voice and put its culture on the global stage by joining the global reggae community. Through taking Jamaican music back to its roots, he recontextualized the oppression and political struggles that reggae seeps itself in, bringing the basis of the diaspora back in conversation with the diaspora at large to allow for a more pan-African form of cultural expression. Dube's roots reggae brought African people to the table in terms of conversation about the black diaspora by mimicking Caribbean artists' assertions of African authenticity.

On 22 September 2017, Gallo Records South Africa released a 25-track limited-edition commemorative album titled The Times We've Shared. The album features Dube's biggest hits, exclusive performances, and three previously unreleased tracks.

In Australia, Dube's music has found resonance in remote Aboriginal communities, and his popularity has led him to be called "Bigger than the Beatles" throughout much of central and northern Australia.

In August 2026, the Mpumalanga Department of Education opened the Lucky Dube Secondary School of Performing Arts for the community of Ermelo.

== Discography ==
=== Mbaqanga ===
- Lengane Ngeyethu (1981)
- Kudala Ngikuncenga (1982)
- Kukuwe (1983)
- Abathakathi (1984)
- Ngikwethembe Na? (1985)
- Umadakeni (1987)

=== with Oom Hansie ===
- Die Kaapse Dans (1986)
- Help My Krap (EP, 1986)

=== Reggae ===
- Rastas Never Die (EP, 1984)
- Remember Me (1994)
- Think About the Children (1985)
- Slave (1987)
- Together as One (1988)
- Prisoner (1989)
- Captured Live (1990)
- House of Exile (1991)
- Victims (1993)
- Trinity (1995)
- Taxman (1997)
- The Way It Is (1999)
- Soul Taker (2001)
- The Other Side (2003)
- Respect (2006)

=== Compilations ===
- Serious Reggae Business (1996)
- Live in Jamaica (2000)
- The Rough Guide to Lucky Dube (2001)
- Lucky Dube Live in Uganda (2003)
- Retrospective (2008)
- The Ultimate Lucky Dube (2011)
- The Times We've Shared (2017)

== Filmography ==
- Getting Lucky (1985)
- Lucky Strikes Back (1987)
- Voice in the Dark (1990)
