= Alanta dance =

Type of dance

Alanta is a Nigerian dance. The dance style uses a patterned movement of the hands as if fanning flames while raising one leg and facial contortions that suggest experiencing orgasm or acute pain.
