= Victims (Lucky Dube album) =

Studio album by Lucky Dube
- Released: 1993
- Genre: Reggae
- Labels: Gallo, Shanachie
- Producers: Richard Siluma, Simon Law

Lucky Dube chronology
House of Exile (1991)	Victims (1993)	Trinity (1995)

Victims is an album by the South African musician Lucky Dube, released in 1993. It has sold more than a million copies. Lucky Dube supported the album with a North American tour.

== Production ==
The album was produced by Richard Siluma and Simon Law. The title track, about black-on-black crime, references Bob Marley's "Redemption Song". "Keep On Knocking" is about the love of a mother for her child. Lucky Dube based his lyrics on the experiences of real people, rather than news coverage of political events. Lucky Dube used a horn section and emphasized a more rock guitar style. Lucky Dube's backing band, the Slaves, performed on Victims.

== Critical reception ==
Professional ratings
Review scores
Source	Rating
AllMusic	2/5 stars
Robert Christgau	(dud)
The Encyclopedia of Popular Music	3/5 stars
MusicHound World: The Essential Album Guide	3/5 stars
The Philadelphia Inquirer	3/4 stars

The Philadelphia Inquirer wrote that "Lucky Dube's buttery baritone, Rasta preacher vibe and relaxed old-style groove will come as a delight to fans of the classic Wailers records." The Chicago Tribune noted that the album "mixes Jamaican and African influences with a sharply modern pop-oriented approach." The Tampa Tribune called it "an appealing blend of solid, grooving music with a concern for the plight of the oppressed."

The Gazette determined that "the singer's studio delivery always seems less fiery, less passionate ... that has never been truer than on his latest release." The Boston Globe stated that "smooth horns and a myriad of percussion instruments keep things moving seamlessly as Dube tackles his usual themes of oppression, racism and liberation in the spiritual and physical sense." The Boston Herald concluded that Lucky Dube's "range of material—from heart-wrenching groovers to tough-minded reggae-rockers—and vivid arrangements make this album a contemporary roots reggae treasure." The Columbus Dispatch included Victims on its list of the best albums of 1993.

AllMusic wrote that the album "manages to ease him into a lighter, more commercial setting without diluting his message or sound."

== Track listing ==
Gallo Records

No.	Title	Length
1.	"Keep On Knocking"	3:59
2.	"Victims"	4:26
3.	"Johnny"	4:28
4.	"Soldiers for Righteousness"	6:26
5.	"My World"	6:25
6.	"Little Heroes"	4:33
7.	"You Know (Where to Find Me)"	4:18
8.	"Lovers in a Dangerous Time"	4:04
9.	"My Game"	5:06
10.	"Different Colours / One People"	6:18

2012 Remastered bonus tracks
No.	Title	Length
11.	"Together as One (Live)"	7:24
12.	"War & Crime (Live)"	5:40
13.	"Born to Suffer (Live)"	9:22

Shanachie Records

No.	Title	Length
1.	"Different Colours / One People"	6:18
2.	"Lovers in a Dangerous Time"	4:04
3.	"Victims"	4:26
4.	"My World"	6:25
5.	"My Game"	5:06
6.	"Keep On Knocking"	3:59
7.	"Soldiers for Righteousness"	6:26
8.	"You Know (Where to Find Me)"	4:18
9.	"Johnny"	4:28
10.	"Little Heroes"	4:33
