= Liz Anjorin =

Nigerian actress and movie producer

- Born: Elizabeth Ibukunoluwa Anjorin; Badagry, Lagos State, Nigeria
- Education: Olabisi Onabanjo University
- Occupations: Actress, Producer, Business Tycoon
- Years active: 2006-Present

Elizabeth Aishat Anjorin is a Nigerian actress, filmmaker and Producer, predominantly in the Nigerian Yoruba movie industry.

== Early life and education ==
Anjorin was born in Badagry in Lagos State, in the predominantly Yoruba southwestern geographical area of Nigeria. Her father was a Christian and her mother a Muslim. She has said that she grew up in poverty with her mother, was once a food seller, and was driven to succeed by the fear of again being poor. She entered Olabisi Onabanjo University in 2003, where she was a student activist, and graduated in 2007 with a BSc in Transport Planning and Management after leaving to pursue acting. She then took acting classes, at which time she met Idowu Ogungbe and Ahmed Alasari, who helped her with her career.

== Career ==
As an actress, Anjorin came to prominence at the end of the first decade of the 21st century; films she appeared in include Ise Onise and Arewa Ejo in 2009 and Owowunmi in 2010.

Anjorin now produces the films in which she appears. Her first self-produced movie was Tolani Gbarada. Others include Gold, on her own life, Iyawo Abuke, the 2012 comedy Kofo Tinubu, Kofo De First Lady, and Owo Naira Bet, reportedly the most expensive Yoruba film up to that time. It premiered in 2017 and was released in 2018. She is one of the wealthiest actors in Nigeria.

She is also a fashion designer and sells clothes and accessories.

== Awards ==
Anjorin won the Best Actress Award at the Young Achievers Awards in 2012 for Kofo Tinubu, and the City Pride Achievers Award for Best Actress in 2013 and 2014, the second time also for Kofo Tinubu. At the 2014 City People Entertainment Awards, she was nominated for Best Actress of the Year (Yoruba) and was awarded Yoruba Movie Personality of the Year. At the 2017 City People Entertainment Awards, she won Yoruba Movie Personality of the Year (Female) and a Special Recognition Award for Owo Naira Bet.

Year	Event	Prize	Result
2012	Young Achievers Awards	Best Actress	Won
2014	City People Entertainment Awards	Yoruba Movie Personality of the Year	Won
2017	City People Movie Awards	Special Recognition Award	Won
2017	City People Movie Awards	Yoruba Movie Personality of the Year (Female)	Won
2016	Zulu African Film Academy Awards	Best Actress Indigenous Female	Won

== Personal life ==
Anjorin is married to Alhaji Abdulateef Lawal with whom she had a daughter. She also has a daughter from her previous marriage. She converted from Christianity to Islam and adopted the name Aishat. In August 2023, she renounced Islam and asked her fans to stop addressing her with Islamic titles during an Instagram live session.

In September 2019, she was involved in a feud on social media with Toyin Abraham. She accused Abraham of accusing her of trafficking cocaine, leading to her being searched at an airport. Anjorin has since apologized to Toyin Abraham publicly after the incidence as the information was found to be untrue. The feud was ended by Bolaji Amusan, president of the Theatre Arts and Movie Practitioners Association of Nigeria.

== Selected filmography ==
- Iyawo Ojokan
- Ise Onise (2009)
- Arewa Ejo (2009)
- Owowunmi (2010) as Tinuke
- The Dance Movie Project (2016) as Mrs. Balogun
- Tolani Gbarada
- Gold
- Iyawo Abuke
- Kofo De First Lady (2014) as Kofo
- Kofo Tinubu (2012)
- Owo Naira Bet (2017)

== See also ==
- List of Yoruba people
- List of Nigerian actresses
