= Daddy Fresh =

- Born: Innocent Michael Onyebuchi; 1971 (age 54–55); Lagos State, Nigeria
- Origin: Nigerian
- Genres: Reggae
- Occupations: Singer, musician
- Instrument: Vocalist
- Label: Fresh Recordz

Daddy Fresh is a veteran Nigerian reggae singer from Abia state and was born in Lagos state Nigeria, Daddy Fresh started his musical career professionally in the mid-1980s. He was the founding member, leader, lead vocalist, and songwriter, of the group “DE Pretty Busy Boys” which comprises Daddy Showkey Cashman Davies and Sexy Pretty. He became famous in the late 1990s all over Nigeria. During this time, he was honored as the "King of the Ajegunle Musicians" for his innovation of a music genre known as galala or ghetto music. Ghetto music's development was not entirely his own, as it was also influenced by the work of Daddy Showkey and Baba Fryo.

His songs "Elerugbe erue", "Faka Fiki faka" and "Fiji fa" sold over 300 thousand units in Lagos state. Later, over 1 million of his songs were sold illegally by pirates at Alaba International Market.

In 2017, he once advised the new generation artistes that their songs should not always be about "whine your waist" and they should also avoid repetition of words and try to sing songs that would impact positively the nation's economy.
