= Hadiza Nuhu =

Nigerian academic researcher (born 1965)

- Born: 23 August 1965 (age 60); Kano State
- Education: Pharmacognosy
- Alma mater: Ahmadu Bello University , Newcastle College
- Occupations: Lecture, academic researcher
- Known for: HERB 25

Hadiza Nuhu OON (born 23 August 1965) is a senior lecturer in the Department of Pharmacognosy and Drug Development at Ahmadu Bello University. She is also an herbal medicine practitioner. Nuhu is an associate professor of pharmacy.

== Early life and education ==
Born in Kano State on 23 August 1965. She holds a PhD in pharmacognosy from Ahmadu Bello University, Zaria and a certificate in information technology from Newcastle College, UK.

== HERB 25 ==
In 2009, her 12 years of research produced Herb 25, an antimalarial medication which she describes as an enhanced ethnomedical preparation from a screened combination of herbs that have been used in Nigeria traditionally to treat malaria. Herb 25 is an anti-malaria drug to treat Chloroquine-resistant malaria and is registered by NAFDAC. It dispensed in tea bags. It will be the first time a University in Nigeria will successfully produce such a drug.
