= David Obongekong David =

Nigerian researcher, educator

- Education: Fellow Institute of Consulting, Chartered Institute of Personnel and Development
- Occupation: Educator

David Obongekong David (born 26 December 1984) is a Nigerian researcher, educator, and professor of Comparative Literature at El ROI London University and Weldios University of Management and Technology. He is the founder of the Nigerian Books of Record and the NBR Institute for Professional Development.

== Early life and education ==
David Obongekong David (Born on December 26, 1984), hails from Akai Ubium, Nsit-Ubium Lga, Akwa Ibom State. He had his early education at Salvation Army Schools and later earned a Ph.D. from Shield of Faith Bible College in California, USA.

== Career ==
Prof. David is the founder of the READS Campaign, convener of Nigerian Image Revolution (NIR), a coalition of pro-democracy groups, and founder of the first Nigerian encyclopedia of Indigenous records.

David contributed to academia in creative writing and comparative literature. He established an Indigenous record-keeping culture in universities, academic facilities, and institutions and also introduced relevant cultural goals, subjects, and local languages into the system to deepen the pool of Nigerian academia and professionals.

He is an advocate for democratic values and the enhancement of Nigeria’s global image and World Organisation for Human Rights and Peace representative for the rights of marginalized communities in Nigeria.

His activism resulted in amendment of Universal basic education Act to guarantee every child’s right to 12 years of education.

In 2020, he was recognised by Young Global Leaders, an initiative of the World Economic Forum. and by the Governor Umo Eno of Akwa Ibom State with a State Recognition Award for his contributions to the community, particularly for assisting over 4,000 less privileged individuals in the state.

== Professional membership ==
He is a Board Member at Global Youth Mental Health Inc. (GYMHA) in Australia, YYCI Global Leaders in the UK,Fellow of the Chartered Institute of Personnel and Development (FCIPD), Fellow of the Institute of Consulting and an Ambassador of the sovereign Kingdom of Hawaii to Nigeria.
