= Yessiey Award =

Annual accolade

Yessiey Awards
- Awarded for: Writing, Acting, Humanitarian, art, Entrepreneurship, and Journalism
- Website: yessiey.com

The Yessiey Awards formerly known as Yessiey Magazine Awards is an annual accolade presented by Yessiey Magazine to honour writers, actors, humanitarians, art, music, dance, literature, theatre, visual arts, entrepreneurs, and journalists. The award recognizes exemplary contributions.

Yessiey Awards is presented annually by Yessiey Magazine owned by Oluwaseun Olaegbe. To be considered for a Yessiey Award, a media piece or person must go through an entry process. The award also involves a voting process where nominees are selected, and winners are determined through public voting.

== History ==
The name Yessiey was coined from the slogan which states “YES! Stay Informed”. In 2022, the Award was renamed the Yessiey award and the Award is an annual awards ceremony celebrating achievements in the field of acting, writing, journalism, humanitarian, business and arts. The winners of each category were voted for by members of the public, and were announced at the awards ceremony.

The Yessiey Awards also organizes the Yessiey Africa 100 Most Influential People award, which highlights individuals who have made impactful contributions to their fields and the wider community.

== Recipients ==
Writers, Actor/Actress, Humanitarian, Art, Entrepreneur, and Journalism are the six categories of the Yessiey Awards. Some of the individuals recognized include:

Winner	Title
Victor Osimhen	Nigerian professional footballer
Achraf Hakimi	Moroccan professional footballer
Davido	Nigerian-American singer, songwriter, and record producer
Tyla	South African singer
Burna Boy	Nigerian singer, songwriter, and record producer
Anthony Joshua	British professional boxer
Aliko Dangote	Nigerian businessman and industrialist
Elena Maroulleti	Greek Cypriot American independent journalist/reporter
Yemisi Adedoyin Shyllon	Prince of Ake in Abeokuta, Ogun State, Nigeria, and Nigerian artists and collector
Mabel Oboh	Nigerian broadcaster,actress, film producer
