= Joe Okei-Odumakin =

Nigerian activist

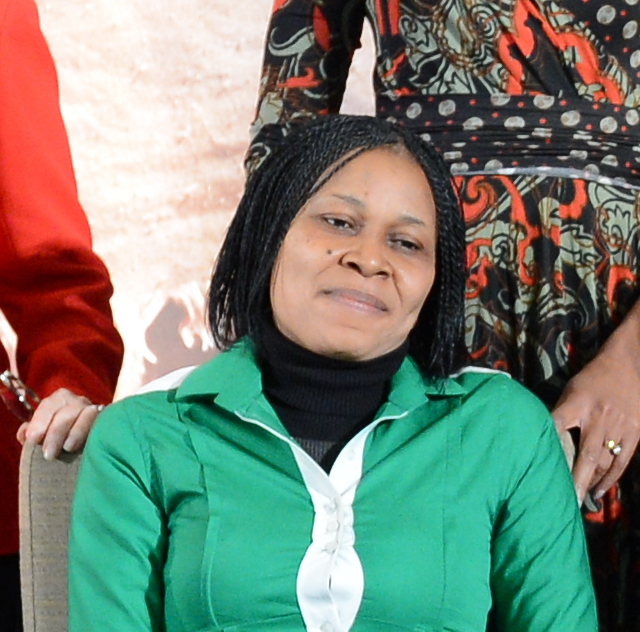
- Odumakin in March 2013
- Born: Josephine Obiajulu Okei; 4 July 1966 (age 59); Zaria, Kaduna, Nigeria
- Occupation: Women's rights activist
- Spouse: Yinka Odumakin (m. 1997; died 2021)

Josephine Obiajulu Okei-Odumakin (born 4 July 1966) is a Nigerian women's rights activist. She is the president of the human rights groups, Women Arise for Change Initiative and the Campaign for Democracy.

== Early life ==
Odumakin was born in Zaria, Kaduna, Nigeria, and grew up in a Roman Catholic household.

== Education ==
She received a bachelor's degree in English Education in 1987, followed by a master's in Guidance and Counseling and a doctorate in History and Policy of Education from the University of Ilorin.

== Activism and arrest ==
She has frequently been arrested for her activism, detained 17 times during the military rule of Ibrahim Babangida.

She was involved with over 2,000 cases where a woman's rights had been disregarded. The cases included extrajudicial killings of women or their husbands by the police. The rights of their children were also ignored by the Nigerian school or even hospital authorities.

== Achievements ==
In 2013, Odumakin was presented an International Women of Courage Award from the United States Department of State. The award was made by Michelle Obama and John Kerry at the US State Department's Dean Acheson Auditorium in celebration of International Women's Day. In the year 2019, Dr Odumakin facilitated the training of participants at the 10th Civil Society Organisation Professionalism, Effectiveness and Therapy (CSO-CPET) Workshop themed Mobilising Women for Change. The training is bi-annual, and it is aimed at building capacity and promoting excellence among civil society groups, inspiring and driving professional ethics in the business operations of CSOs and creating new solutions to the prevalent challenges faced by private organisations.

== Organization ==
She is the executive director of the Institute of Human Rights & Democratic Studies; the founding president of Women Arise for Change Initiative; the chairman of the Task Force of the Citizen Forum; the president of the Centre for Change in Community Development & Public Awareness; the president of the Centre for Participatory Democracy; and spokesperson for the Coalition of Civil Society Organizations in Nigeria, she is also recognised as challenging human rights abuses.

== Family ==
She was married to Peter Yinka Odumakin until his death in 2021 of COVID-19 complications on 2 April at the Lagos State University Teaching Hospital (LASUTH). The couple got married in 1997 had their first baby, a girl, in 2000 and the second, a boy, in 2003. While the girl was named after Joe, the boy was named Abraham after the late Afenifere leader, Pa Abraham Adesanya.
