= Baba Fryo =

Nigerian singer

Baba Fryo born Friday Igweh is a veteran Nigerian singer from Ajegunle. He is known for releasing street songs. His most popular song in Nigeria was titled "Dem go dey pose" which he released in the late 1990s. The song was written in Nigerian Pidgin, to become popular with a dancing style, known as Galala, invented by legendary Baba Fryo and his Ajegunle music colleagues such as Daddy Fresh, Daddy Showkey.

== Personal life ==
Baba Fryo said in 2017 that he wished he married a woman who is also in the showbiz business.

He lamented that had he married a celebrity like himself, his career wouldn't have declined as it did because the wife would have raised his career as well. He, however said much hard work has brought him back up on his 'feet'.

== See also ==
- Daddy Showkey
- Daddy Fresh
