= Hadiza Lantana Oboh =

Nigerian pilot

- Born: 1959
- Died: 8 February,1998
- Citizenship: Nigeria
- Occupation: Pilot

Hadiza Lantana Oboh (1959–1998) was a Nigerian pilot. She was the first and only female pilot for Nigeria Airways. She was murdered on 8 February at her house, in a suspected robbery involving members of her domestic staff.

== Life ==
Oboh had been flying for another airline for a couple of years before moving to work for Nigeria Airways. She started at Nigeria Airways as Flight Officer on a Boeing 737-200.

== Death ==
Hadiza Lantana Oboh was 39 years old when she was murdered. Police found her decomposed body in the septic tank at her house after arresting her gardener for attempting to sell items belonging to her. Several members of Oboh's domestic staff were accused of murder and released on bail. They disappeared, and later proved to have given false addresses.
