= Galala (dance) =

Music genre and dance form from Lagos

Galala is a music genre and dance form popular in Lagos, Nigeria developed by local reggae musicians.
