= Olabisi Onabanjo University =

Public university in Ago-Iwoye, Ogun State, Nigeria

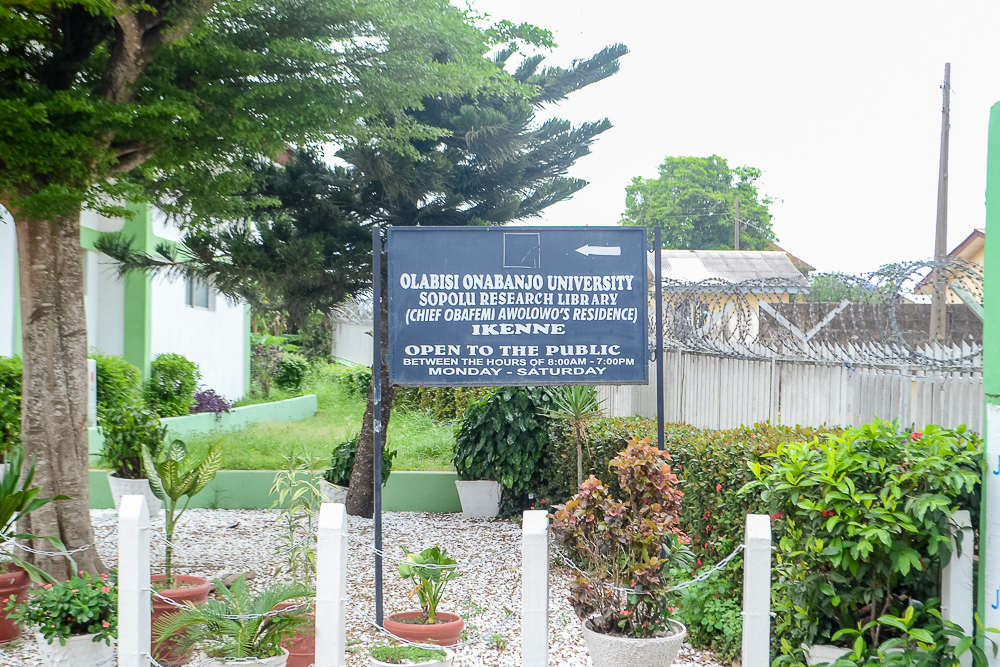
- Former name: Ogun State University
- Motto: Excellentia Humana et Patriae opus
- Type: State-owned University
- Established: 1982
- Vice-Chancellor: Professor Johnson Ayodeji Agboola
- Location: Ago-Iwoye, Ogun State, Nigeria; 6°55′21″N 3°52′17″E
- Campus: Urban
- Language: English
- Colours: Blue
- Website: www.oouagoiwoye.edu.ng

Olabisi Onabanjo University, Ago-Iwoye is a state-owned university in Ago-Iwoye, Ogun State, Nigeria. It was founded on 7 July 1982 originally as Ogun State University (OSU) before being renamed to its current name on 29 May 2001, in honour of Olabisi Onabanjo, whose efforts as the then civilian governor of Ogun State helped establish the university. Many students still refer to the institution as OSU, an acronym for the former name.

The university had a total output of 10,291 graduates and 1,697 postgraduates.

Olabisi Onabanjo University has multiple campuses. The main campus in Ago-Iwoye is popularly called Permanent Site (PS) by the students and a Mini Campus, which was the home of the Faculty of Science until it was moved to the permanent site in January 2013.

The Faculty of Agriculture is in Aiyetoro, the Faculty of Engineering is in Ibogun, the College of Medicine, the faculties of Basic Medical Sciences and Pharmacy are in Shagamu. Students and alumni of the Olabisi Onabanjo University are addressed as 'Great OOUITES.'

The mini campus OOU, Centre for Continuous Education (CCED) is now the pre-degree studies unit, Diploma and Jupeb, while the main campus is the heart of undergraduate programs.

== Vice-chancellors ==
Professor John Olubi Sodipo (1982–1990)
Professor T. O Bamkole (1991–1995)
Professor O. Y Oyeneye (1995–1999)
Professor Layi Ogunkoya (1999–2001)
Professor Afolabi Soyode (2001–2006)
Professor Odutola Osilesi (2006–2009)
Professor Sofola Olusoga (2009)
Professor Wale Olaitan (2009–2013)
Professor Saburi Adejimi (2013–2017)
Professor Ganiyu Olatunji Olatunde (2017–2022)
Professor Ayodeji Johnson Olayinka Agboola (2022–present)

== Faculties and Departments ==
The University has ten faculties with a total number of fifty-three departments which are spread across its campuses in the state. They include:

Faculty of Science
This Faculty consists of six departments and includes:

Department of Chemical Sciences
Department of Mathematical Sciences
Department of Microbiology
Department of Plant Science and Applied Zoology
Department of Physics
Department of Earth Sciences

Faculty of Education
This faculty consists of five departments and includes:

Department of Educational Foundations and Counselling
Department of Educational Management and Business Studies
Department of Human Kinetics and Health Education
Department of Science and Technology Education
Department of Arts and Social Sciences Education

Faculty of Law
This faculty consists of four departments and includes:

Department of Commercial Law
Department of International Jurisprudence
Department of Private Law
Department of Public Law

Faculty of Art
This faculty consists of five departments, which include:

Department of English and Performing Arts
Department of Religious Studies
Department of History and Diplomatic Studies
Department of Nigerian and Foreign Languages
Department of Philosophy

Faculty of Administration and Management Sciences
This faculty consists of six department, which include:
Department of Accounting
Department of Business Administration
Department of Transport Management
Department of Banking and Finance
Department of Taxation
Department of Public Administration

Faculty of Social Sciences
This faculty consists of seven departments, which include:

Department of Sociology
Department of Economics
Department of Geography
Department of Political Sciences
Department of Psychology
Department of Library and Information Science
Department of Mass Communication

Faculty of Basic Medical Sciences
This faculty consists of seven departments, which includes:

Department of Hematology and Blood Transfusion
Department of Chemical Pathology
Department of Medical Microbiology and Parasitology
Department of Morbid Anatomy Histopathology
Department of Physiology
Department of Anatomy

Faculty of Clinical Sciences
This faculty consists of seven departments, which includes:

Department of Community Medicine and Primary Care
Department of Medicine
Department of Anaesthesia
Department of Surgery
Department of Radiology
Department of Paediatrics
Department of Obstetrics and Gynecology

Faculty of Pharmacy
This faculty consists of five departments and includes:

Department of Pharmacy/Biopharmacy
Department of Pharmacology
Department of Pharmaceutics/Pharmaceutical Technology
Department of Pharmaceutical Medicinal Chemistry
Department of Pharmaceutical Microbiology

Faculty of Engineering and Environmental Sciences
This faculty consists of six departments and includes:

Department of Computer Engineering
Department of Mechanical Engineering
Department of Electrical/Electronics Engineering
Department of Civil Engineering
Department of Fine and Applied Arts
Department of Urban and Regional Planning
Department of Architecture

Faculty of Agricultural Sciences
This faculty consists of three departments, which includes:

Department of Crop Production
Department of Animal Production
Department of Home and Hotel Management

== Notable alumni ==
- Lateef Adedimeji, actor and filmmaker
- Taiwo Babatunde Alli, entrepreneur
- Liz Anjorin, actress and business tycoon
- Jide Awobona actor and filmmaker
- Emamode Edosio, filmmaker and film director
- Sola Kosoko, actress
- Adedoyin Oseni, Gospel Saxophonist
- Oluwatobi Oyero, bassist
- Spinall, Dj and record producer
- X-Dynasty, online streamer and YouTuber
- Sunkanmi Omobolanle, Nigerian film actor and director

== See also ==
- Olabisi Onabanjo University Teaching Hospital
