= Daddy Showkey =

Nigerian singer

Daddy Showkey is a veteran Nigerian galala singer. His genre of music is called ghetto dance or simply ghetto. He was born in Ajegunle and rose to popularity there in the late 1990s. He was born as John Odafe Asiemo but is known as Daddy Showkey all over the Ghetto. He hails from Olomoro Kingdom in Isoko South LGA of Delta State.

== Singles ==
- 1996 "Diana"
- 1991 "Fire Fire"
- 2000 "The Name"
- 2011 "The Chicken"
- 2011 "Sandra"
- 2011 "Young girl"
- 2011 "Ragga Hip hop"
- 2011 "Asiko"
- 2011 "Mayazeno"
- 2011 "Girl's cry"
- 2011 "What's gonna be gonna be"
- 2011 "Welcome"
- 2011 "Ghetto Soldier"
- 2011 "Jehovah"
- 2011 "Dancing scene"
- 2017 "One Day"
- 2017 "Shokey Again"

== Endorsement ==
In 2018, Daddy Showkey became a brand ambassador for Real Estate Management Revelation Property Group in Lagos State.

He was among several celebrities like Alex Ekubo, rick ross, Ikechukwu Ogbonna, Belindah Effah, Mary Lazarus and Charles Inojie.

== Albums ==
- 2011 "The Name" somebody call my name showkey
- 2011 "Welcome"blood
