= Rivers State Customary Court of Appeal =

The Rivers State Customary Court of Appeal is a court of justice of second instance that has appellate and supervisory jurisdiction over matters of customary law in Rivers State. It is presided over by a president assisted by a number of judges as prescribed by the Rivers State House of Assembly. The current president is Ihemnacho W. Obuzor, having been appointed to office by Governor Ezenwo Wike since 29 May 2023.

== Objectives ==
The objectives of the Court are to:

1. Interpret the culture and customs of the people of Rivers State while serving justice.
2. Complement the work of the State High Court in justice delivery.

== President ==
The president is appointed by the governor on the recommendation of the National Judicial Council and subject to confirmation by the Rivers State House of Assembly. To be eligible for the office, the Constitution requires that one must have been a legal practitioner in Nigeria for over 10 years with substantial knowledge and experience in the field of customary law. The first president of the Rivers State Customary Court of Appeal was Peter N.C. Agumagu. He served from 2008 until 2014.

== See also ==
- Judiciary of Rivers State
- Rivers State High Court of Justice
