= Nigerian Books of Record =

Nigerian Award

Nigerian Books of Record (NBR) is a reference / Official Book of Record of the Federal Republic of Nigeria for documenting good records held by Nigerians. It is a collection of human achievements categorized into education, literature, agriculture, medical science, business, sports, nature, adventure, radio and cinema etc.

NBR was founded by Professor David Obongekong David and launched by Nigerian Books of Record Research Center in 2011 with His Excellency, Babatunde Fashola, SAN, former Governor of Lagos State.

== History ==
The NBR was acknowledged by Nigerian former president Muhammadu Buhari on September 8th 2016, for the book been a watchlist on credible Sources of tracking Nigerians making impacts in different fields.

The NBR was conceived to promote and support the Government in laundering the Nigerian image, by celebrating Nigeria’s excellent records in other to drive the campaign of the Federal Ministry of Information and National Orientation (Nigeria) and National Orientation Agency (Nigeria), NOA of attitudinal re-orientation among Nigerians.

Nigerian Books of Record as a literary work is published by Nigerian Books of Record Research Center. It is updated and revised yearly.

The NBR is used as reference material for students and lecturers in all Nigerian Universities, Polytechnics and Colleges of Education. Over the years, the NBR grew into a global brand and inspired the publication of the 36 Nigerian States Books of Record.
