= List of television stations in Nigeria =

The first terrestrial television broadcast signals in Nigeria occurred on Saturday October 31, 1959 and belonged to the Western Nigeria Television Service (WNTS). Nigeria was one of the first countries to introduce television broadcasting in Africa. Nigeria also has the largest terrestrial television network in Africa which is the Nigerian Television Authority (with over 96 stations scattered around the country). As of 2010, 40% of Nigerian population had television in their homes.

This is a list of television stations based in Nigeria.

== List of TV stations ==
=== A–E ===
- Trust TV
- Advocate Broadcasting Network
- Afia Tv
- Africa Independent Television
- Africa Nolly Channels
- AKBC
- Arewa 24
- Arise News
- Capital TV
- Channels TV
- Daawa TV
- DBN TV
- Dove TV
- Dunamis TV
- Emmanuel TV
- 1TV Network
- El-zion Global Network Tv

=== F–J ===
- Flame TV Flame TV
- FortisTV FortisTV
- Galaxy TV
- Gamji TV, Gusau
- Hip TV
- Ìtàgé Telifisan
- ITV

=== K–O ===
- KAFTAN TV
- Koga TV
- Lagos Television
- Minaj Systems Tv Obosi
- Minaj Broadcast Network Obosi
- Minaj Broadcasting International (MBI)
- Murhi International Television (MITV)
- Nassarawa Broadcasting Service
- News Central TV
- Nigerian Television Authority
- Niger State Television
- Odenigbo FM Obosi Anambra state
- Ogun State Television
- Ondo State Radiovision Corporation
- ONTV Nigeria
- OYJ TV

=== P–T ===
- Plus TV Africa
- Qausain TV
- RAPID TV
- Rhema TV
- Silverbird Television
- Soundcity TV
- Sunna trcv
- Superscreen
- Televista
- Trust TV
- Trybe TV
- TVC Entertainment
- TVC News

=== U–Z ===
- WA
- Wazobia TV

== See also ==
- Media of Nigeria
- List of newspapers in Nigeria
- Nigerian newspapers
- List of radio stations in Nigeria
- Cinema of Nigeria
- Telecommunications in Nigeria
- List of television stations in Africa

== Bibliography ==
- J.O. Onah; et al. (1988). "Viewer Preference for TV Stations and Programmes: A Pilot Study". Africa Media Review. 2 (3) – via Michigan State University Libraries, African e-Journals Project.
- Charles C. Umeh (1989). "Advent and Growth of Television Broadcasting in Nigeria: Its Political and Educational Overtones". Africa Media Review. 3 (2) – via Michigan State University Libraries, African e-Journals Project.
