= Tajuddeen Adepetu =

Nigerian media personality

- Born: Jos

Tajuddeen Adepetu is a Nigerian media mogul, entrepreneur, founder and CEO of media conglomerate - Group8 (previously Consolidated Media Associates (CMA)) consisting several free to air and direct to home television channels and radio stations including Africa’s popular music channels Urban TV and radio, SoundCity TV and radio, Televista, OnMax, Spice TV, OnTV, Correct TV and radio. Adepetu is also a TV producer and the executive producer of SoundCity MVP Awards, an annual award that recognizes musicians and performers across Africa. He has mentored a number of on air personalities such as Moet Abebe and Denrele Edun through his media platforms

== Early life and education ==
Tajuddeen Adepetu is a native of Erin-Oke but was born and raised in Jos, Plateau State. He earned a bachelor's degree in Film and Television from the University of Jos before proceeding to the Nigeria Television Authority (NTA) College where he trained in script writing.

== Career ==
Adepetu media career began in radio as a fresh graduate from the University of Jos in the early 1990s with the establishment of his company Consolidated Media Associates. His first contract was production of radio jingles in Fulfulde dialect for a Veterinary Research Institute. He left Jos for Lagos in search for media opportunities 1995. Once in Lagos, Adepetu noticed the growing Nollywood and television programming and diversified his radio script writing into movie and television programing scripting. His first TV drama script Family Circle was received with critical acclaim and soon after he produced a popular sports game show the Hard Tackle on local TV, an award winning TV series Everyday People and produced Critical Assignment starring Michael Power.

== Media organisation ==
CMA

Adepetu established Consolidated Media Associates in 1990 focusing on print, broadcasting and events management. CMA subsidiaries include Alphavision Multimedia and General Media Production with footprints in Terrestrial Television, Cable, digital and satellite. CMA owns several free to air and direct to home television channels and radio networks in Nigeria and Kenya including Soundcity TV, Trybe TV, Televista TV, Spice TV, ONTV Nigeria, Correct TV, ONMAX, VillageSquare TV, Urban96 Radio Network, Access 24, Soundcity Radio Network and Correct FM.

Group8

In 2020, Adepetu renamed CMA Graoup8 as a holding company to bring all his media channels, events and technology properties under a single brand name for easy identification following complaints by his staff that it was difficult to identify all his media channels, events and tech properties under different names. Under the new name, all TV channels are grouped as Cre8, radio channels as Radi8, event projects as Activ8 and tech properties as Innov8 to form Group8.
