= Theo Ukpaa =

Nigerian filmmaker

- Born: Theo Ukpaa; 30 May; Surulere, Lagos State
- Education: B.Sc Economics; Master of Business Administration
- Alma mater: University of Benin (Nigeria); Loyola Marymount University; New York Film Academy
- Occupation: filmmaker
- Years active: 2008–present
- Employers: Spice TV (former); Trace Urban (former); Soundcity TV (former); Linda Ikeji TV (former); Africa International Film Festival (current)

Theo Ukpaa (born May 30) is a Nigerian film director and producer for stage and television.

== Early life and education ==
Ukpaa, born in Surulere, Lagos, was raised in both Lagos and Los Angeles. He is the child of Capt. Herbert Ukpaa and Beatrice Ukpaa. His father, a sailor, died in 1998. In 2005, Ukpaa graduated with first-class honors in Economics from the University of Benin. He then pursued his Master of Business Administration (MBA) on a full scholarship at Loyola Marymount University in Los Angeles. During his time in the United States, Ukpaa enrolled to study filmmaking at the New York Film Academy. He also has a Diploma in Contract Law from the esteemed Harvard University.

== Career ==
Ukpaa started his career at 16 years of age by learning stage production, and at some point was mentored in stage theatre by Wole Oguntokun and Rogers Ofime.

As a TV director, he has worked with Soundcity TV, Spice TV and Trace Urban, Linda Ikeji TV. In an interview with This Day, he credited Tajuddeen Adepetu and Sam Onyemelukwe for giving him the links to these opportunities. As well as being the director of at least one edition of MTV Africa Music Awards and The Headies Awards, he has been the director of The Experience gospel concert for at least five editions. He also hosted Coal City Film Festival, alongside Izu Ojukwu and Chichi Nwoko.

His movie The Hunter was exclusively premiered at the by Africa Magic. His movie Lagos Landing was released in collaboration with Alliance française. He commended the impact of the ingression of Netflix and Amazon Prime Video into the Nigerian movie industry, as well as the influence of cinema. He is the Chief operating officer (COO) of Africa International Film Festival (AFRIFF), through which he creates and environment where veteran filmmakers can equip and inspire upcoming directors.

He was named among the Top by directors by African Culture Magazine in 2020.

== Controversy ==
Ukpaa was accused of rape by TV personality Emilia Samuel. The incident was alleged to have occurred for the first time when he was still working with Spice TV and she came as a contestant for a pageant organized by the TV station in 2008. He denied the incident and no charges were filed, although his employer offered to foot the legal bills if the victim wanted to press charges. This accusation led to his sacking by Linda Ikeji as Head of programmes from Linda Ikeji TV.

== Filmography ==
- Experience Marathon (short) 2015
- MTN Space (short) 2015
- MTN Callertunes (short) 2016
- Run 2017
- Landing Lagos 2018
- My Name Is Not Olosho 2019
- The Call Girl 2021
- Enitan (short) 2022
- Third Party 2022
- The Hunter 2023
- Haywire 2023
