= Kayode Akintemi =

Nigerian journalist

- Kayode Akintemi on Discovery For Youth 2026
- Citizenship: Nigeria
- Occupations: Broadcast journalist and television host
- Years active: 1980–present
- Employer: News Central TV
- Organization: Broadcasting Organization
- Television: Sunrise Saturday

Kayode Akintemi (born June 26, 1965) is a Nigerian Broadcast Journalist, TV Presenter, Subject Matter Expert, Project Management and ICT Consultant. He worked as the General Manager of Channels TV, as well as an ICT and Project Manager Consultant to London Borough of Hillingdon. Kayode left Channels TV in 2016 to set up Plus TV Africa, where he occupied the post of managing director and Editor-in-Chief of News Channel. As of 2021, Kayode is the MD, Ignite Media in the Republic of Ghana. In 2016, he featured as a speaker on the International Programme for the Development of Communication where President John Dramani Mahama was one of the panelists. On different occasions, Kayode anchored Nigerian presidential media chats with President Goodluck Jonathan and his successor, Mohammadu Buhari. He was the host of Sunrise Saturday, which aired on Channels TV. He formerly hosted "Wake Up Africa", a show that aired every Friday between 6.am and 9.am, on 94.3 FM.. In 2026, Akintemi was recognized among the “100 Most Reputable Africans” by Reputation Poll International in recognition of his contributions to African media and broadcasting..

== Background and career ==
Kayode obtained a Higher National Diploma in Mass Communication with a specialization in Broadcast Journalism from Ogun State Polytechnic, now Moshood Abiola Polytechnic. He later received a Postgraduate Diploma in Information Technology. He began his broadcasting career in the early 1980s with Radio Nigeria as presenter of Teen and Twenty Beats. In 1987, he joined the services of Ogun State Broadcasting Corporation, where he worked for three years before becoming an Academic Staff at Ahmadu Bello University, Department of Mass Communication. In 1991, he joined Ogun State Television as Head of Television Programmes and in 1993, he established an Independent Production Company, "The Kay Associate" with the late Prince Kehinde Adeosun, former Chairman of Promoserve Advertisement. In 1994, he left Nigeria to London where he worked with BEN Television, a British television channel. In March 2011, he joined Channels TV as General Manager Operations. And in 2013, he was nominated for the Nigerian Broadcasters Merit Awards as "Best Station's Manager of the year", the same year Channels TV emerged as Best TV Station of the year. In December 2023, Kayode Akintemi was appointed as the Managing Director and Editor-in-Chief of News Central TV

In January 2013, he refuted the claim by some media that the conference organized by Channels TV to brainstorm on the improvement of the Nigerian Police Force was barred by the Federal Government of Nigeria. He said the suspension was to ensure the participation of a wider range of stakeholders. On different occasions, Kayode has anchored Presidential Media Chats for President Goodluck Jonathan and his successor Muhammadu Buhari in Nigeria. In 2015, Kayode anchored the maiden edition of the presidential media chat featuring President Muhammadu Buhari. The Chat was designed for Nigerians to meet and ask questions on their government policies and programs.

In 2016, Kayode was a speaker on the International Programme for the Development of Communication featuring John Dramani Mahama, former president of Ghana. As the new MD of Metro TV (Ghana), he met with Kojo Oppong Nkrumah, Ghana's information minister, to discuss collaboration with the government through the development of journalism in Ghana and better its relationship with its citizenry.

== Awards and recognitions ==
in 2026, Kayode won the HTA Excellence in Media Leadership Award. The award was presented in New York City by Nelson Aluya, a US-based physician and professor.

== Membership ==
Akintemi is a member of several professional organization, including the Royal Television Society (RTS), Nigeria Institute of Public Relations (NIPR) and the Radio Academy. He is also a member of the Society of Information Tech and Management (SOCITM) UK a member of Institute of Directors (IOD).

== See also ==
- John Momoh
