= Urban96 Radio Network =

Urban 96 Radio Network
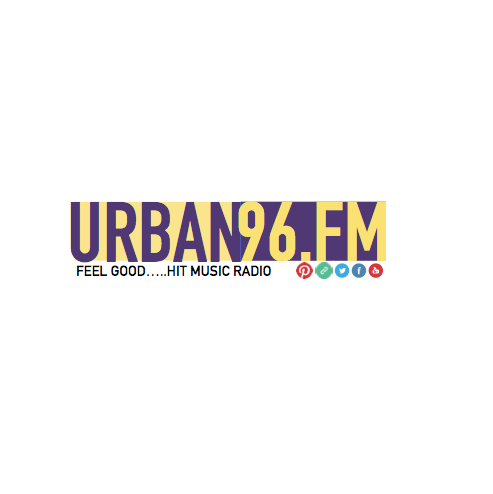
- Lekki, Lagos; Nigeria
- Broadcast area: Lagos, Abuja, Port Harcourt, Enugu and Uyo
- Frequency: 96.5 MHz

Programming
- Language: English
- Format: Urban contemporary

Ownership
- Owner: Alphavision Multimedia
- Sister stations: Soundcity Radio Network

History
- First air date: 1 April 2016

Technical information
- Transmitter coordinates: 6.42995°N 3.40893°E

Links
- Website: www.urban96.fm

Urban 96 Radio Network is an English speaking commercial radio station with headquarters in Lekki, Lagos. The station broadcasts an urban contemporary radio format, playing a variety of music genres including R&B, hip hop, pop with a blend of culture and style. The radio network first launched her Lagos dial on the 96.5 frequency with OAPs getting on-air on 1 April, It was a trending topic on Twitter on that day. It is owned and operated by Alphavision Multimedia, subsidiary of CMA Group and It is one of the most popular private media group in Nigeria.

The station served a record-breaking 400,000 listeners on the first month of test transmission; it targets a core audience in the 14-34 age group.

== The Big Switch Party ==
Alphavision Multimedia threw her ‘Big Switch’ party that doubled as official launch of her 96.5 Lagos dial. The event took place on 8 July 2016 at Lekki Coliseum Rooftop in Lagos. DJ Neptune began his set at 7PM, with the OAPs taking turns to climb the stage, introduce themselves and shows they host on the 96.5 dial in an improvised radio studio accompanied by electrifying performances from Mayorkun, Reekado Banks, Skales, Solidstar, Saeon, Adekunle Gold, AjeButter22, Mr. 2kay, Viktoh, Endia, Yung L, Niniola and more. The event was streamed live to audience and users of the Urban96 android, iOS app and urban96.tv website with the official hashtag getting over 7,040,964 impressions on social media.

== Programming and shows ==
From Akon's 'Stadium Live Show,' The Baka Boyz, Full Throttle Show to OAPs handling three hours shift during crucial times of the day with the weekly 'Urban World 40,' Top 40 countdown.

- Oreka Godis, Tyeng Gang (Urban Breakfast)
- Abiola 'Abby' Oyebade (Urban Xtra, Urban Superstar Top 10)
- Segun Emdin (Early Urban Drive, Touchdown 10)
- Efe 'Fay Fay' Odudu (Sunny Side Up Weekends, Bangin; in My Head)
- DJ Neptune (Urban Party Mix, Urban Club Mix, Urban Power Mix)
- Big Tak, Shedy (Traffic - The Urban Drive, Urban World 40)
- Sulaiman Ladani (Urban Afterdark, Bangin' in My Head)
- Kingsley 'Tage' Obike (Rise and Shine, Urban Breakfast Weekend)
- Muna (The Saturday Show, The Sunday Show)

== OAPs and team ==
- Tajuddeen Adepetu
- Olamide Adedeji
- Jonathan James Lyomghang
- Tyeng Gang
- DJ Neptune
- Oreka 'Rhecks' Godis
- Abiola 'Abby' Oyebade
- Efe 'Fayfay' Odudu
- Kingsley 'Tage' Obike
- Segun Emdin
- Kingsley Ladani
- Munachi 'Muna (rapper)' Abii
- Dro Ameh

== Urban96 TV ==
In March 2016, Urban96FM launched a TV channel of the same name, Urban96TV. The station launched as Africa's first and premium digital only 24/7 TV channel. The channels can also be watched via dedicated iOS and Android apps, as well as her website. In May, Urban96 TV began syndicating TV content beginning with 'Urban96 Sing Along' show on ONTV Nigeria hosted by Fay Fay. The TV channel plays non-stop music videos 24 hours a day, 7 days a week and also feature some exclusive content. Urban96 TV is aimed at a younger target audience.

== See also ==
- List of radio stations in Lagos
