= Uche Odoh =

Nigerian photographer, filmmaker and model (born 1989)

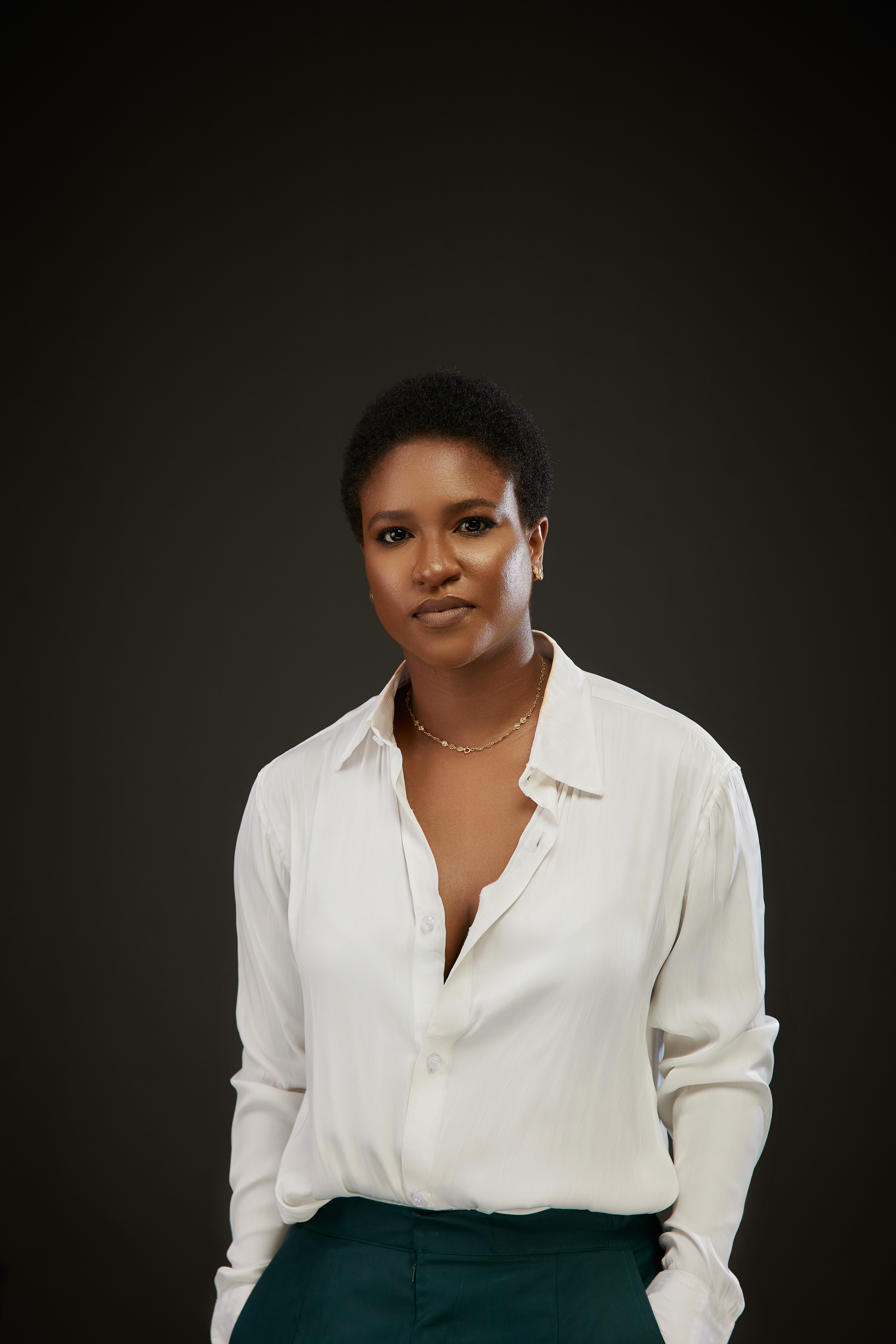
- Born: 30 August 1989 (age 37); Enugu State, Nigeria
- Education: MetFilm School London
- Occupations: Filmmaker, photographer
- Years active: 2007 – present
- Notable work: Hell Ride
- Website: https://visualsbyuche.com

Uche Odoh // (born 30 August 1989) is a Nigerian filmmaker, photographer and model who rose to prominence after participating in the 2007 Amstel Malta Box Office competition.

== Early life and education ==
Odoh was born in Enugu State, Nigeria, on 30 August 1989. She studied agronomy at the Enugu State University of Science and Technology for her bachelor's degree. In 2011, she attended a short film course with Del-York International, facilitated by the New York Film Academy and this set off her curiosity for film and TV. She obtained a diploma in film production from Vancouver Film School, Canada, in 2015 and a master's degree in film and TV production from MetFilm School, London, in 2023.

== Career ==
Odoh's foray into entertainment began with her participation in the 2007 edition of the Amstel Malta Box Office competition. She then began her career as a model featuring in billboard campaigns for Sprite, MTN, Airtel, as well as appearing in music videos for Wizkid, Bracket and Banky W, before transitioning into photography and filmmaking.

After moving back to Lagos, Nigeria, in 2015, Odoh worked with the CMA Group as a director and producer, creating and producing lifestyle shows for their fashion channel Spice TV and also Trybe TV. In 2017, she left to work in Nollywood, where she trained under Tope Oshin and gained experience as a line producer, production manager, casting director and a first assistant director. Odoh worked as a first assistant director on films including King of Boys, Up North, and Christmas Is Coming.

Odoh runs a production company, Eastside Productions, where she produces and directs TV commercials and music videos, as well as an online TV channel, Gosi TV, which is focused on creating original African short-form content.

Odoh released her first major project in 2019, a web series titled Life As It Is, which garnered millions of views on YouTube and earned her a nomination for Best TV Series at AMVCA 2020. In 2020, she co-founded a film studio, Propa Studios, and directed her first feature film, Hell Ride.

== Filmography ==
=== Director ===
- Hell Ride - feature film (2020)
- Life As It Is – TV series (2019)
- Without You – short film (2016)

== See also ==
- List of Nigerian film producers
