= Odoh =

Odoh audiomay refer to:

- Oblivious DNS over HTTPS (ODoH), a computer network protocol
- Ohio Department of Transportation, formerly known as the Ohio Department of Highways
- Abraham Odoh, English footballer
- Diego Odoh Okenyodo, Nigerian writer, activist, and pharmacist
- Uche Odoh, Nigerian photographer
