= Stephen Adewale =

Nigerian journalist and politician

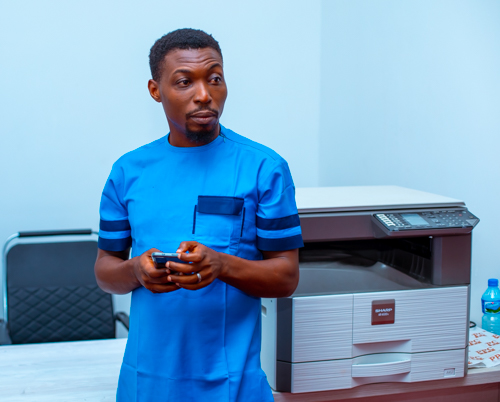
- Born: 3 August 1982 (age 44); Akure, Ondo State
- Education: Obafemi Awolowo University
- Occupations: Journalist; politician
- Office: Ondo State SDP chair

Stephen Adewale is a Nigerian journalist and politician who is the current head of station at KAFTAN TV.

== Biography ==
Adewale was born on 3 August 1982 in Akure, Ondo State. He started his education in 1998 at Salvation Army Primary School and was admitted to Obafemi Awolowo University in 2007 where he graduated with a bachelor's degree in History and International Relations.

After meeting Adewole Adebayo in 2014, Adewale was crucial in the creation of KAFTAN TV and is the current head of station. In 2015, Adewale was made a director of African Dialogue Mission and joined the African Union Joint Task Force on Peace and Security in 2016. In 2022, Adewale was made the chairman of Social Democratic Party in Ondo State.

== Early life and education ==
Adewale was born on 3 August 1982 to Mr. Ademola Adewale and Mrs Eunice Adunni (née Kumuyi). He hails from Akure in Akure South Local Government, the capital city of Ondo State. He attended Salvation Army Primary School in Akure. Having worked as a bus conductor for many years, he later attended Prospect High School in Akure for his Secondary School education. He then went on to study History/International Relations at Obafemi Awolowo University and graduated in 2011. Adewale observed his mandatory one year National Youth Service Corps at Osun State College of Education, Ilesa.

== Personal life ==
Adewale is married to Mrs Kehinde Adewale (née Akinwale).

== Writing career ==
He began writing while a student at Obafemi Awolowo University. Stephen has written over 100 opinion pieces for national and online newspapers. His first academic piece was a contribution to a Cambridge Scholars book. He has also written an academic article on the role of civil society in the Nigerian Leadership Project. He produced yet another revolutionary study, this time focusing on Internally Displaced Persons and their challenges for survival in Abuja.

== Books ==
Adewale is the author of the following books:

- "A Surge from the Forest: Towards Rescuing the Africa's Giant from the Boko Haram's Clench"
- From Structural Adjustment to Privatisation in Nigeria

== Political career ==
Adewale was elected Chairman of the Social Democratic Party in Ondo State by the party's delegates on April 8, 2023. When Ondo State Governor Rotimi Akeredolu failed to transfer power to his the deputy, Adewale's SDP rose to prominence, taking the lead in the campaign for power transfer to Lucky Aiyedatiwa. Adewale's efforts were so noticeable that he was named one of Ondo State's five young major political actors. Adewale resigned as Chairman of the Social Democratic Party on December 31, 2023.
