= ONTV =

ONTV, or variants thereof, may refer to:

- ON TV (TV network), now-defunct American UHF subscription television service
- ONTV Nigeria, a Lagos-based channel
- ON E, formerly known as ON TV, an Egyptian digital television channel launched in 2009
- CHCH-DT, a station in Canada that used the branding "ONtv" during the 1990s
- "On TV", a song by the Buggles from the 1981 album Adventures in Modern Recording
- ...on Television, British television programme
