= List of radio stations in Lagos =

The following is a list of radio stations in Lagos, Nigeria

Radio station	Frequency		
Champion 90.7FM, Ojodu-Berger	Grajos FM 88.3 LAGOS	FM 88.3 (MHz)	
Balogun Radio	Online radio		
Brila FM sport	FM 88.9 (MHz)	Abim 93.5FM	
Super FM	FM 92.7 (MHz)		
Fresh FM Lagos	FM 105.3 (MHz)		
Eko FM	FM 89.7 (MHz)		
Galaxy Radio	99.1 FM	Ikeja, Lagos.	
Radio Lagos	107.5FM (MHz) Radio Lagos107.5FM		
Rock FM Nigeria	Online radio		
LASGIDI 90.1 FM	FM 90.1 (MHz)	Voice of the People FM	FM 90.3 (MHz)
Mainland FM	FM 98.3 (MHz)		
Lagos Talks	FM 91.3 (MHz)		
WFM 917	FM 91.7 (MHz)		
Inspiration FM	FM 92.3 (MHz)		
BondFM	FM 92.9 (MHz)		
Hot FM Lagos 93.3	FM 93.3 (MHz)		
Rhythm 93.7 FM	FM 93.7 (MHz)		
Rainbow 94.1	FM 94.1 (MHz)		
VYBZ FM	FM 94.5 (MHz)		
DUX FM	FM 94.7 (MHz)		
Wazobia FM	FM 95.1 (MHz)		
Fame104.5FM	FM 104.5 (MHz)		
LASU Radio (Lagos State University)	FM 95.7 (MHz)		
Urban96 Radio Network	FM 96.5 (MHz)		
Cool FM Nigeria	FM 96.9 (MHz)		
Classic FM 97.3	FM 97.3 (MHz)		
Metro FM	FM 97.7 (MHz)		
Smooth 98.1FM	FM 98.1 (MHz)		
SoundCity Radio 98.5	FM 98.5 (MHz)		
KISS FM LAGOS	FM 98.9 (MHz)		
Nigeria Info	FM 99.3 (MHz)		
Jubilee FM	FM 99.7 (MHz)		
The BeatFM	FM 99.9 (MHz)		
Raypower 100.5 FM	FM 100.5 (MHz)		
StarFM	FM 101.5 (MHz)		
Lounge FM	101.9 (MHz)		
Max FM Lagos (formerly Radio Continental)	FM 102.3 (MHz)		
NaijaFM	FM 102.7 (MHz)		
UnilagFM	FM 103.1 (MHz)		
Radio 103.5FM	FM 103.5 (MHz)		
Law FM 103.9	FM 103.9 (MHz)		
Kennis 104.1 FM	FM 104.1 (MHz)		
S.M.A.fm	FM 104.7 (MHz)		
City 105.1FM	FM 105.1 (MHz)		
Faaji FM	FM 106.5 (MHz)		
LagosTrafficRadio	96.1fm		
Hi-impact radio	102.1FM		
Kwenu FM	93.9FM		

NOUN Radio 105.9 Fm (National Open University of Nigeria)
