= Ayo Ayoola-Amale =

Nigerian poet and lawyer

Ayo Ayoola-Amale is a Nigerian poet and lawyer born in Jos, Nigeria.

== Early life and education ==
Ayo Ayoola-Amale
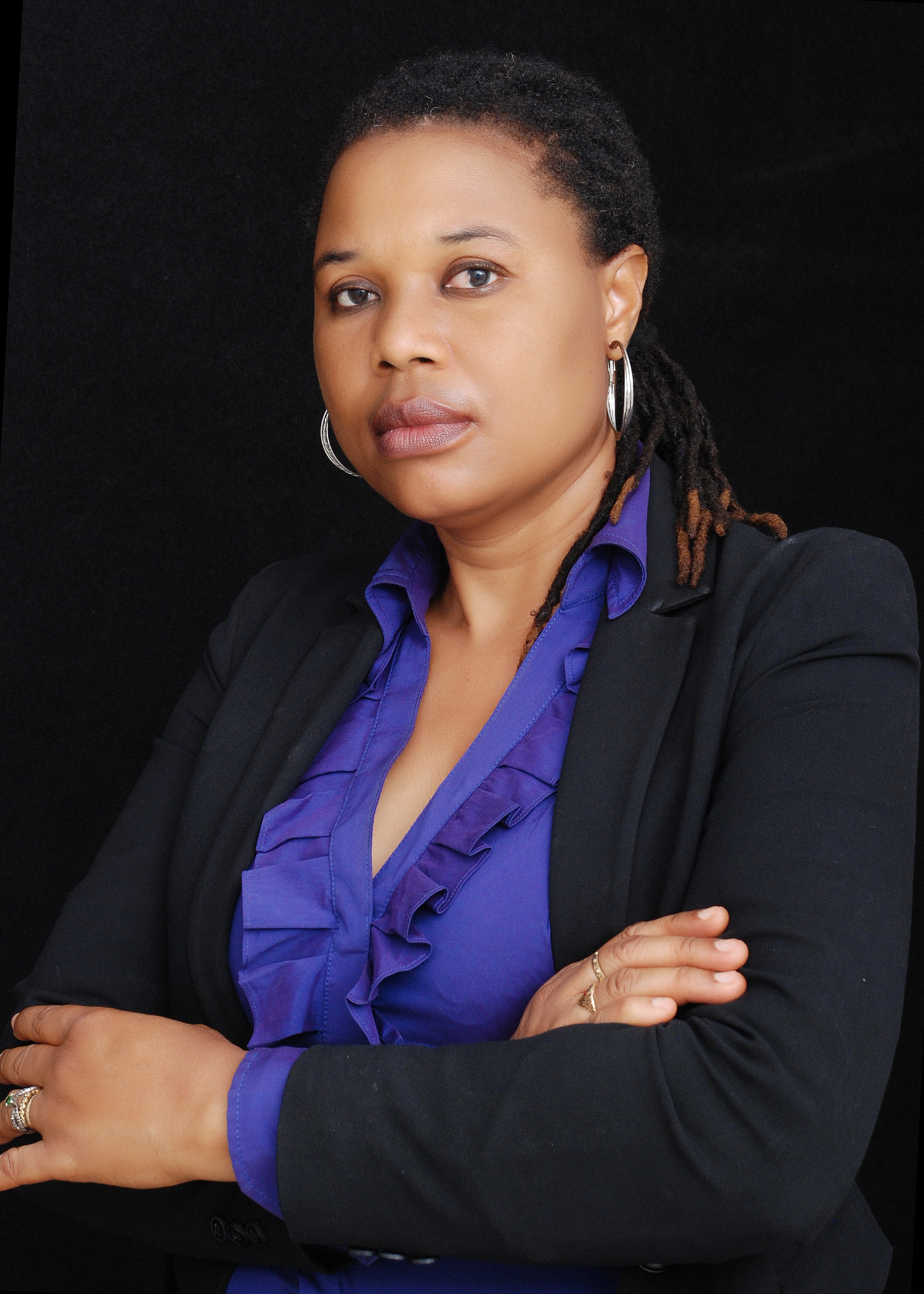
- Ayo Ayoola-Amale (November 2011)
- Born: Adebisi Ayo Adekeye; Jos, Nigeria
- Occupations: Conflict resolution professional, ombudsman, poet

According to Women in Peace, at a young age, Ayoola-Amale joined the peace movement. She was a member of the Rotary Club, the Rotaract Club, the Girl Guides, and Women in Nigeria (WIN). A 2024 article on the Peace From Harmony website indicates that as a teenager, she was involved with Girls Guide groups focused on social justice issues, including violence against women and girls.

Her father is a Nigerian war veteran, lawyer and security expert who served Nigeria as the National Security Adviser and the Security Adviser to the Vice President, and Director of the State Security Service. Her mother was a princess and businesswoman.

At the age of 10, Ayoola-Amale moved to Northern Nigeria to live in the government-reserved area of Kano, due to her father's work. She was a pupil of St. Louis Secondary School, Bompai, Kano.

She studied law at Obafemi Awolowo University and was called to the bar in 1993. She later attended the University of Lagos, where she earned an LLM degree, and the University of Ghana, graduating with an LLM in Alternative Dispute Resolution (ADR), an alumna of Clingendael and UNITAR with professional certifications from University of California, and University of San Diego.

== Career ==
Ayoola-Amale is a lawyer, conflict resolution professional, ombudsperson, certified facilitator, and the lead at First Conflict Resolution Services, Inc. She is a member of the Chartered Institute of Arbitrators, UK. She was a Senior Lecturer and Head of Department of Law, Faculty of Law, Kings University College, Wisconsin University and Ghana Technology University College, Accra, Ghana.

=== As a lawyer and conflict resolution professional ===
Ayoola-Amale has worked in the field of law in Nigeria, Ghana and Senegal. She was partner and head of the commercial law department at Ayo, Ajibulu and Co., Legal Practitioners and Notaries, Lagos, and Bayo Ayorinde and Co., Legal Practitioners, Lagos. She is Ombudsperson and Mediator for Mediators Beyond Borders International, US. She has presented papers at various local and international conferences on conflict resolution, property and commercial law and practice, peace education, and women's peace and security, among other topics. She was also the legal advisor of the Ghana Association of Writers (GAW), Accra.

== Work ==
=== Peacebuilding work ===
Ayoola-Amale founded the Women International League for Peace and Freedom (WILPF), Ghana Section, and the International Cities of Peace, Lagos Nigeria. She is a member of the Peace Roalso the Senior Vice-President for Africa of the International Association of Educators for World Peace (IAEWP) and the Regional Chairperson for Africa of the Diplomatic Commission of IAEWP (NGO ECOSOC, United Nations). The IAEWP was the 1987 recipient of the Peace Messenger Award from the UN. She is the past National Chancellor of the IAEWP Nigeria Chapter and former International Vice President for West Africa.

Ayoola-Amale is the Vice President of the Global Harmony Association (GHA) and GHA Africa's President. She was also the ex-CEO of Pearl-Allied Group of Company, Nigeria (1996–2008). She is a member of the International Team of Dedicated Experts, One Humanity Institute, Auschwitz-Oswiecim, Poland; a member of the Advisory Council of Leaders, International Cities of Peace, US; a member of the International Advisory Board of the World Constitution and Parliament Association (WCPA), and a member of the International Advisory Board of the Sri Ramanuja Mission Trust, India. She is an Ambassador of the Love Foundation, UK, and participated in the Love Begins with Me UK interview series.

She serves on the Central Advisory Committee of the Existential Harmony & Interdisciplinary Research Project and the World Conference 2015. She was the National Secretary of the Coalition of NGOs Associated with UN-DPI Ghana and the Legal Adviser for the Ghana Federation of the Disabled. Ayoola-Amale is also an executive member of the National Peace Council (Universal Peace Federation International Ghana Chapter). She was a regional representative and is currently a Fellow of the World Mediation Organization (WMO). She is a Member of the International Editorial Board of Poetry and Peace Journal, International Society for Intercultural Studies and Research (ISISAR), and has contributed chapters to books on global peace, including ISISAR Journals and the Handbook of Research Examining Global Peacemaking in the Global Age.

=== Literary work ===
In 2010, Ayoola-Amale founded the Splendors of Dawn Poetry Foundation. Along with Nigerian poet and writer Diego Odoh Okenyodo, she co-founded the West Africa Poetry Prize (WAPP) in 2013, of which she is a director. She is the editor and co-publisher of the anthology "Notes of a Baobab," published by Butterflies and Elephants on Moon, Forum of Science and the Arts, and a member of the editorial board of Wuerzart Literary Journal, Germany.

Ayoola-Amale is the author of six volumes of poems and a play and has performed her poetry at national and international events. Her literary works include the play Broken Dreams (2011), and the poetry collection Life Script, portions of which have been published online. She is the Co-founder Poets of the Planet and the Vice President of Movimiento Poetas del Mundo (Poets of the World).

In May 2013, Ayoola-Amale and the Splendors Performance Poetry Team participated in the Yari Yari Ntoaso: Continuing the Dialogue International Conference in Accra, Ghana. In 2013, she organized "100 thousand poets for change" in Accra and was a guest poet at the Medellin International Poetry Festival, the Kistrech Poetry Festival in Kenya, and other international literary festivals. Her poems have appeared in various national and international anthologies, journals, and magazines and have been translated into several languages.

== Awards ==
- Universal Ambassador for Peace (Award from Universal Peace Federation International)
- 2013: Honourable Global Mediator (World Mediation Organization) Berlin, Germany
- IAEWP World Peace Ambassador, IAEWP
- Ambassador, the Love Foundation, UK (2011)
- Academy of Universal Global Peace, New York City- Ambassador at Large for Global Peace
- Muse of Poetic Harmony, 2011
- Ambassador of peace and harmony, Global Harmony International, 2010
- Recipient of Pentasi B Universal Inspirational Poet Award, 2016
- Recipient of World Writer Laureate 2024

== See also ==
- List of peace activists
- List of African writers by country
