= News Central TV (Nigeria) =

24-hour overseas news channel from Nigeria

News Central Television
- Country: Nigeria
- Broadcast area: UK; Africa
- Headquarters: Lagos, Lagos State, Nigeria

Programming
- Language: English

Ownership
- Owner: News Central Media Limited
- Key people: Kayode Akintemi (MD and editor-in-chief); Tonye Adonye-Halliday (COO)

History
- Launched: 2018

Links
- Website: newscentraltv.com

Availability

Terrestrial
- DStv: 422
- StarTimes: 274

Streaming media
- newscentraltv.com/watch-live/: Watch live (Available worldwide)

News Central TV is a Nigerian independent 24-hour news and media television channel based in Lagos, Nigeria. The parent company, News Central Media, was founded in 2017 by Anthony Dara. It began broadcasting in August 2018. Its primary focus is producing news and current affairs programs on Nigerian and global issues.

== History ==
News Central TV was founded in 2018 as a private television station by UK-based Nigerian broadcast engineer and entrepreneur Anthony Dara. The company commenced operations in Lagos state, Nigeria.

On 1 August 2022, the station was launched on DStv and was allocated channel 422. It was first launched on StarTimes satellite television in 2020 and was allocated channel 274.

In December 2023, Kayode Akintemi was appointed the managing director and editor-in-chief, taking over from Tonye Halliday.

In July 2024, News Central TV went into partnership with Nairametrics to launch a stock market show called MarketPulse. The show would run on weekdays from 4:00 PM to 5:00 PM.

== Awards and recognition ==
In 2024, News Central TV was honoured with an award at the International Association of Women Police conference for supporting women across Nigeria by promoting gender equality, promoting the hiring of women in law enforcement, career developmental, and community engagement.

== See also ==
- List of television stations in Nigeria
- List of news channels
- List of television networks by country
