= ITV Television Playhouse =

British anthology TV series (1955–1963)

ITV Television Playhouse, often simplified to Television Playhouse, is a British anthology television series produced by and airing on the ITV television network from 1955 through 1963. The series premiered with the teleplay Midlevel on 24 September 1955. Its final episode was the teleplay They Don't Make Summers Like They Used To which aired on 27 December 1963.

Originally airing one hour long episodes weekly on Friday nights during its first season in 1955–1956, the programme was subsequently moved to Thursday night weekly broadcasts for its second (1956–1957) and third (1957–1958) seasons. The programme moved back to weekly Friday night broadcasts for its fourth (1958–1959) and fifth (1959–1960) seasons. It returned to Thursday night weekly broadcasts for seasons 6 (1960–1961) and 7 (1961–1962). The series moved back to Friday night broadcasts for season 8 (1962–1963). Its final season, season 9 (Autumn 1963), was only half as long as the other seasons and aired on Thursday nights.

== Cast ==
- Campbell Singer (10 episodes)
- Thomas Heathcote (9 episodes)
- Richard Caldicot (8 episodes)
- June Brown (8 episodes)
- Barbara Lott (7 episodes)
- Zena Walker (7 episodes)
- John Robinson (8 episodes)
- Dinsdale Landen (7 episodes)
- Mervyn Johns (7 episodes)
- Carl Bernard (7 episodes)
- Brian Wilde (5 episodes)
- Peter Sallis (5 episodes)
- Llewellyn Rees (5 episodes)
- Robert Desmond (5 episodes)
- Francis Matthews (5 episodes)
- Wilfrid Brambell (5 episodes)
- Patrick McGoohan (1 episode)

== Archive status ==
Out of an original total of 388 episodes, 259 episodes are currently missing.

Episode 32 of season 5, Each Wind That Blows, first broadcast on 15 April 1960, was recovered by the Film is Fabulous project on 22 April 2025.

== DVD release ==
The only episode of the series that has been released on DVD is Series 1 Episode 12 "Quay South" which was released by Televista TV on 6 May 2008.

== See also ==
- Playhouse (British TV series)
