= StarTimes GO =

African integrated e-shopping platform

StarTimes GO is an African integrated e-shopping platform created by the media group StarTimes.

StarTimes GO operates three retail models (TV shopping, Online shopping and Phone-call shopping) that are integrated into a single platform.

== History ==
StarTimes GO was launched during the COVID-19 pandemic in Uganda and Kenya as a home shopping service combining a television show, an online shopping platform and a call center service to offer StarTimes subscribers a safe way to do their shopping without having to leave their home.

Quickly, StarTimes GO expanded to neighboring countries and by September 2020 the service was available in 11 sub-Saharan African countries (Uganda, Kenya, South Africa, Zambia, Tanzania, Nigeria, Rwanda Mozambique, Ghana, Côte d'Ivoire and Democratic Republic of the Congo).

On 1 September 2020, StarTimes officially launched the StarTimes GO TV channel as a free-to-air shopping channel in Uganda, Kenya and Nigeria.

== Products ==
The platform currently sells electronic products as well as daily commodities.

== Services ==
Products are introduced through the TV shows and can be ordered through StarTimes online platform and call center. The products are delivered directly to the consumer.

== StarTimes GO channel availability ==
Country	Channel Number
Uganda	DTH-002 DTT-203
Kenya	DTH-002 DTT-002
Nigeria	DTH-002 DTT-002
