= Forum on China–Africa Cooperation =

Multilateral cooperation group

FOCAC
- Forum on China–Africa Cooperation 中非合作论坛 (Zhōng Fēi hézuò lùntán) (Pinyin); Forum sur la coopération sino-africaine
- Logo

- Africa and China
- Abbreviation: FOCAC
- Formation: 10 October 2000
- Founder: (China) Jiang Zemin (China) Zhu Rongji (Togo) Gnassingbé Eyadéma (Tanzania) Salim Ahmed Salim
- Founded at: Beijing, China
- Type: International forum
- Purpose: Political
- Fields: International politics
- Funding: Attendee states
- Website: http://www.focac.org

The Forum on China–Africa Cooperation (FOCAC) (simplified Chinese: 中非合作论坛; traditional Chinese: 中非合作論壇; pinyin: Zhōng Fēi hézuò lùntán; French: Forum sur la coopération sino-africaine) is an official forum between the People's Republic of China and all states in Africa with the exception of the Kingdom of Eswatini. It is the primary multi-lateral coordination mechanism between African countries and China and since 2018 is viewed by those countries as a cooperation platform within the Belt and Road Initiative.

== Membership and structure ==
FOCAC is the primary multi-lateral coordination mechanism between African countries and China. Along with the China-Arab States Cooperation Forum (CASCF), FOCAC was one of the first regional organizations established by China outside its territorial periphery. Since 2018, China and the African states explicitly view FOCAC as a part of China's Belt and Road Initiative.

As of 2022, the members of FOCAC are 53 African countries (all except Eswatini), China, and the African Union Commission. A number of North African states are dual members of both CASCF and FOCAC: Algeria, Djibouti, Egypt, Libya, Mauritania, Morocco, Somalia, Sudan, and Tunisia. Although the African Union has increasingly played a coordinating role since joining CASCF in 2012, each African state represents itself in FOCAC and activities are implemented bilaterally between China and individual African countries.

Each meeting results in a three-year action plan and Chinese pledges of loans, grants, and export credits.

== Rationale and principles ==
Although established following the urgings of African diplomats in the late 1990s, China has taken the lead in FOCAC throughout the existence of the organization. In addition to African requests, China had its own reasons for establishing FOCAC, including: creating an organization to ensure future political and economic influence in Africa in light of other great and rising powers setting up similar organizations, counteracting European Union influence in light of the first EU-Africa Summit, counterbalancing emerging India-Africa and Turkey-Africa cooperation organizations, and advocating for developing country causes.

FOCAC emphasizes political cooperation between Africa and China. The core political norms that China advocates within FOCAC are its Five Principles of Peaceful Coexistence: mutual respect for territory and sovereignty, mutual nonaggression, mutual noninterference in internal affairs, equality and mutual benefit, and peaceful co-existence. These principles are a conservative interpretation of the Westphalian norms of state sovereignty.

== Foreign aid from China ==
Chinese foreign aid is a significant area of interaction within FOCAC, and FOCAC is the primary channel through which China provides resources to the African countries. Through FOCAC, China provides aid in the forms of debt forgiveness, aid grants, concessional loans, and interest-free loans. The sole political condition China requires is adherence to the One China principle. Being largely free of political conditions, China's foreign aid diverges from the global model, which requires more political concessions from recipient countries. The FOCAC founding declaration states China's critique of the dominant global mode of foreign aid which, in the Chinese view, results in the mistreatment of developing countries:

Each country has the right to choose, in its course of development, its own social system, development model, and way of life in light of its national conditions. . . . Moreover, the politicization of human rights conditionalities on economic assistance should be vigorously opposed to as they constitute a violation of human rights.

Following her interviews of African scholars and diplomats, U.S. Professor of International Securities Studies Dawn C. Murphy concludes that many African countries genuinely appreciate this moral stance by China against political conditions for foreign aid.

At a 2022 FOCAC coordinators’ meeting, Chinese Foreign Minister Wang Yi announced that China would forgive 23 interest-free loans that had matured at the end of 2021 for 17 African countries.

== Summits ==
FOCAC meets every three years, alternating between an African country and China, although the 2021 meeting took place online due to COVID-19. China often uses the occasion of FOCAC summits to solicit African support for the One China Principle. China also expresses support for the African Union and for United Nations peacekeeping missions during FOCAC summits.

=== 2000, Beijing, China ===
The first Ministerial Conference was held in Beijing from 10 to 12 October 2000. CCP General Secretary Jiang Zemin, Chinese Premier Zhu Rongji, and China's Vice President Hu Jintao participated in the conference. More than 80 ministers from China and 44 countries and representatives from 17 international and regional organizations attended this meeting. African attendees included President Gnassingbé Eyadéma of Togo, President Abdelaziz Bouteflika of Algeria, President Frederick Chiluba of Zambia, President Benjamin William Mkapa of Tanzania, and Secretary-General Dr. Salim Ahmed Salim of the Organization of African Unity. The conference passed the Beijing Declaration of the Forum on China–Africa Cooperation and the Programme for China–Africa Cooperation in Economic and Social Development.

=== 2003, Addis Ababa, Ethiopia ===
The second Ministerial Conference was held in Addis Ababa, Ethiopia, from 15 to 16 December 2003. Chinese Premier Wen Jiabao, Ethiopian Prime Minister Meles Zenawi, six African presidents, three vice presidents, two other prime ministers, and one president of the senate, as well as President Alpha Oumar Konare of the Commission of African Union, and the representative of the UN Secretary General attended the opening ceremony and delivered speeches. More than 70 ministers from China and 44 African countries attended the conference. The Conference passed the Addis Ababa Action Plan (2004–2006).

Through the 2003 FOCAC plan, China announced it would "grant zero-tariff treatment to some commodities of African LDCs [least developed countries] for access to the Chinese market. The Chinese side will, starting from 2004, negotiate lists of tariff-free goods and the rules of origin with the countries concerned on a bilateral basis."

The 2003 summit was the first at which cultural cooperation was a point of emphasis.

=== 2006, Beijing, China ===
The first FOCAC Summit and the third Ministerial Conference were held in Beijing from November 3 to 5, 2006. Hu Jintao, General Secretary of the Chinese Communist Party and President of China, and heads of state or heads of government from 35 African countries attended this Summit. Hu Jintao rolled out $5 billion worth of concessionary loans to Africa during the summit. As one of the "Eight Measures" for Sino-African relations, Hu Jintao announced the creation of the China-Africa Development Fund to further Chinese investment in Africa with US$1 billion of initial funding with its fund expected to grow to US$5 billion in the future.

China also pledged to open its markets further to African countries, and to increase the number of products from African least developed countries that are eligible for tariff exemptions.

China first announced its Agricultural Technology Demonstrations Centers at the 2006 meeting. Agricultural Technology Demonstration Centers are a major component of China's agricultural cooperation with African countries. The function of these centers is to transmit agricultural expertise and technology from China to developing countries in Africa while also creating market opportunities for Chinese companies in the agricultural sector.

=== 2009, Sharm el-Sheikh, Egypt ===
The fourth Ministerial Conference of the FOCAC was held at Soho-Square, in the Egyptian resort of Sharm el-Sheikh, on 8 to 9 November 2009. The meeting reviewed how the consensus of the Beijing Summit has been implemented. It also adopted a Sharm el-Sheikh declaration and an action plan for 2010–2012 to chart the path for further China–Africa cooperation. Chinese Premier Wen Jiabao, Egyptian President Hosni Mubarak, and African heads of state or government from 49 countries attended the opening ceremony. Also addressing the opening session were the presidents of Liberia, Zimbabwe, Uganda, Sudan, Republic of Congo, Rwanda, Central African Republic, and Tanzania; the prime ministers of Ethiopia, Côte d'Ivoire, and the Democratic Republic of the Congo; the vice presidents of Seychelles, Ghana, and Burundi; the President of the National Assembly of Gabon; and the Chairperson of the African Union Commission. Chinese Foreign Minister Yang Jiechi and Commerce Minister Chen Deming led a delegation to attend the meeting.

A $10 billion low cost loan was announced on November 9, 2009, double the $5 billion loan announced and implemented at the 2006 Beijing Summit. A 1 billion U.S. dollar special loan for small and medium-sized African businesses was also established. China also announced eight new policy measures aimed at strengthening relations with Africa that were "more focused on improving people's livelihoods". Wen announced that China will write off the debt of some of the poorest African nations. He said China will construct 100 new clean-energy projects on the continent covering solar power, bio-gas, and small hydro-power and gradually lower customs duties on 95 percent of products from African states with which it has diplomatic ties. He also stated that China would undertake 100 joint demonstration projects on scientific and technological research, receive 100 African postdoctoral fellows to conduct scientific research in China, and assist them in going back and serving their home countries. The number of agricultural technology demonstration centers built by China in Africa will be increased to 20. 50 agricultural technology teams would be sent to Africa and 2,000 agricultural technology personnel would be trained for Africa, in order to help strengthen Africa's ability to ensure food security.

China also will provide medical equipment and antimalarial materials worth 500 million yuan to the 30 hospitals and 30 malaria prevention and treatment centers built by China and train 3,000 doctors and nurses for Africa. Wen further stated that China will build 50 China–Africa friendship schools and train 1,500 school principals and teachers for African countries and increase the number of Chinese government scholarships to Africa to 5,500 by 2012. China will also train a total of 20,000 professionals of various fields for Africa over the next three years.

The head of the United Nations food agency, World Food Programme, Executive Director Josette Sheeran praised the forum's role in food security, agriculture, and infrastructure in Africa.

Discussions at the summit also highlighted the importance of climate change issues, poverty reduction, and exchanges between African and Chinese think tanks.

=== 2012, Beijing, China ===
The fifth Ministerial Conference of the FOCAC was held on 19 to 20 July 2012, in Beijing, China. Announcements were made by China for support in investment and lending, including a credit line of $20 billion for African countries to build infrastructure, agriculture, and manufacturing to support small and medium-sized enterprises in Africa. Also, the China-Africa Development Fund, which had been announced during the 2006 FOCAC and established with capital of $1 billion, would be scaled up to $5 billion.

The 2012 summit placed significant emphasis on security cooperation and peace. As of at least the 2021 summit, those continue to be regular themes for FOCAC. During the 2012 summit, China announced the Initiative on China-Africa Partnership for Peace and Security, through which it provides financial and technical support to peacekeeping missions conducted by the African Union.

Particularly since the 2012 FOCAC, China has focused more on the quality, effectiveness, and sustainability of the aid it provides to African countries.

=== 2015, Johannesburg, South Africa ===
The second FOCAC Summit and sixth Ministerial Conference was held on 4 to 5 December 2015, in Johannesburg, South Africa. The 2015 summit emphasized China's commitment to assist in the industrialization of Africa. FOCAC started to stress the Belt and Road Initiative beginning with this summit, the declaration of which committed China and African states to "actively explore the linkages between China's initiatives of building the Silk Road Economic Belt and 21st Century Maritime Silk Road and Africa's economic integration and sustainable development agenda, and to seek opportunities to promote common development and realize our common dreams."

A $60 billion package of aid, subsidized lending, and state-backed investment was announced by China. The individual elements of the package were "5 billion dollars of free aid and interest-free loans, 35 billion dollars of preferential loans and export credit on more favorable terms, 5 billion dollars of additional capital for the China-Africa Development Fund and the Special Loan for the Development of African SMEs each, and a China-Africa production capacity cooperation fund with the initial capital of 10 billion dollars."

One of the outcomes of the 2015 forum was the Access to Satellite TV for 10,000 African Villages programme.

=== 2018, Beijing, China ===
The 2018 summit took place in Beijing in early September 2018. A total of 40 Presidents, 10 Prime Ministers, 1 vice-president and the Chairperson of the AU Commission were among the African dignitaries who participated in the Forum. By May 2018, all African UN member states recognised the People's Republic of China as the sole legitimate representative of China, with the exception of Eswatini (Swaziland). It was also reported that more African leaders went to the 2018 summit than to the similarly timed UN General Assembly meeting.

At the summit, General Secretary of the Chinese Communist Party Xi Jinping emphasized the "Five Nos" which guide its foreign policy in dealing with African countries and other developing countries: (1) non-interference in other countries' pursuit of development paths suitable to their national conditions, (2) non-interference in domestic affairs, (3) not imposing China's will on others, (4) not attaching political conditions to foreign aid, and (5) not seeking political self-interest in investment and financing.

The 2018 FOCAC declaration states explicitly that China and the African states view FOCAC as a major platform for coordination as part of the Belt and Road Initiative. Agricultural development was a focus of the 2018 summit. China pledged $60 billion in funds for development in Africa. During the summit, Xi announced additional grants of RMB 300 million and RMB 100 million in emergency food aid from China to South Sudan.

=== 2021, Dakar, Senegal and Beijing, China ===
Due the COVID-19 pandemic, the 2021 meeting was held online via videolink, with participants located in Dakar and Beijing. It emphasized health diplomacy, although it continued to also emphasize political and security cooperation especially in cybersecurity and support for African police.

Per the action plan which followed the summit, the African countries and China committed to increasing parliamentary dialogue by increasing exchanges between the National People's Congress of China and the National Committee of the Chinese People's Political Consultative Conference and the various African national parliaments, the Pan-African Parliament, and the African Parliamentary Union.

=== 2024, Beijing, China ===
The summit was held in Beijing from September 4 to 6, 2024. To promote the summit, China hosted the 7th China-Africa Folk Forum and China-Africa Youth Leaders Forum in Changsha from July 24 to 26, and the China-Africa Media Cooperation Forum in Beijing on August 21. This time, Chinese and African leaders will discuss and cooperate around the theme of "Joining hands to promote modernization and build a high-level Chinese-African community of destiny". This forum is also the largest domestic diplomatic event organized by China in recent years and attended by the largest number of foreign leaders.

The PRC government pledged 60,000 new training opportunities for Africans and additional scholarships for Belt and Road Initiative countries.

The summit also included new clean energy commitments.

== See also ==
- Africa–China relations
- United Nations Economic Commission for Africa
- Post–Cold War era
- China-Africa Economic and Trade Expo
