= KAFTAN TV =

Nigerian television channel

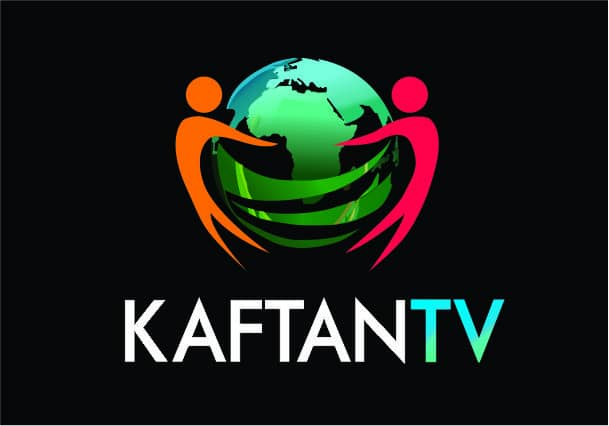
- Country: Nigeria
- Broadcast area: Worldwide
- Headquarters: Ondo City, Ondo State

Programming
- Languages: English, Yoruba, Hausa

Ownership
- Owner: Adewole Adebayo

History
- Launched: September 2018; 7 years ago

Links
- Website: kaftan.tv

King Adebayo Film and Theatre Arts Network Television (KAFTAN TV) is a Nigerian independent 24-hour television channel. Established in December 2016, it is operated by King Adebayo Film & Theatre Arts Network Limited headquartered in Ondo City, Ondo State, with additional offices in Lagos and Abuja. KAFTAN TV should not be confused for KAFTAN TV Limited.

It is a member Nigerian of the Broadcasting Organization of Nigeria (BON) which is a broad coalition of public and private broadcast organizations, duly registered by the Corporate Affairs Commission, as Nigeria's umbrella body of Terrestrial Free-to-Air Radio and Television (Tv), Digital Terrestrial Television (DTT), Direct-To-Home (DTH), and Multimedia Distribution System (MMDS).

== History ==
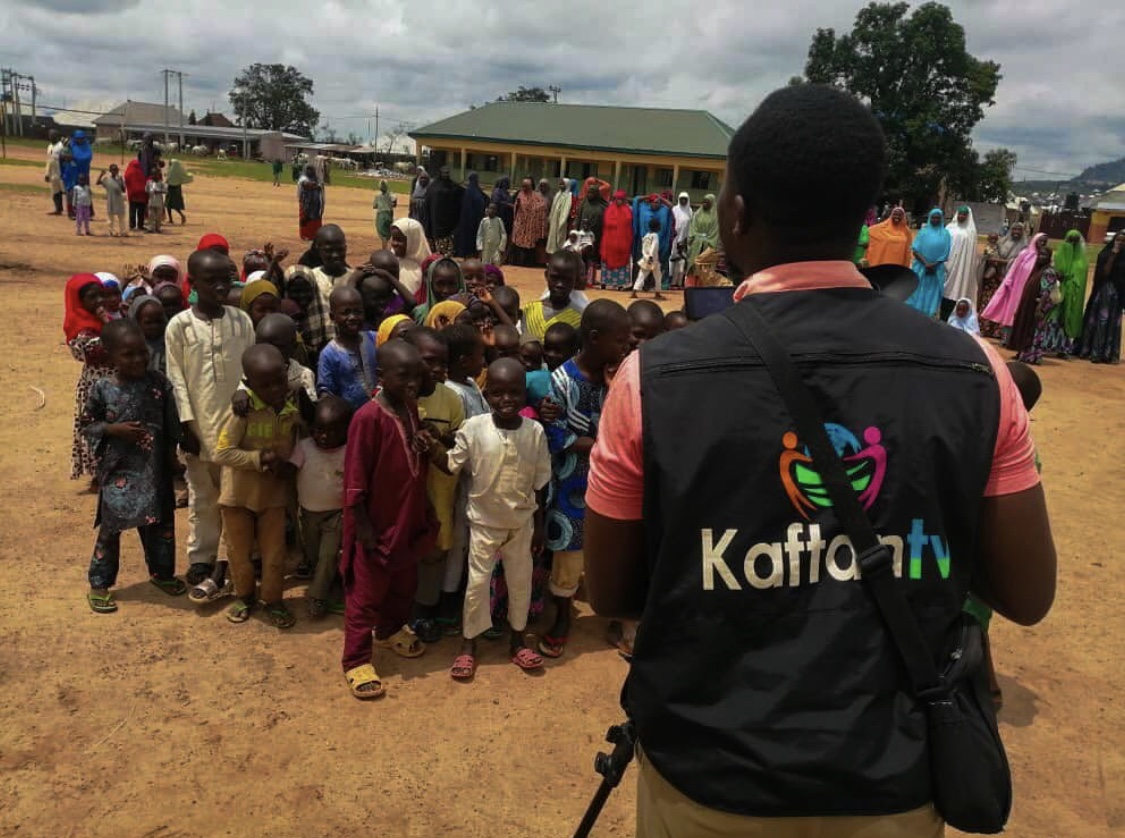
KAFTAN TV crew filming a documentary

KAFTAN TV began broadcasting in September 2018. It broadcasts in the English language on StarTimes, BEN Television, and Lyngsat.

While covering the 2018 Osun State general elections in the state capital Osogbo, a KAFTAN TV crew member sustained injuries after being attacked by thugs during a violent disruption of election proceedings, with production equipment also sustaining irreparable damage.

In August 2020, the company launched its Yoruba-language channel, which also began broadcasting to StarTimes nationwide and outside Nigeria on 1 September 2020.

KAFTAN TV operates a media production and theatre arts training entity and produces original programming, including feature documentaries, TV programs, and drama skits. It began offering a free television broadcasting training program, sponsored by the Queen Lilian Adebayo Foundation, for young people in Ondo State in January 2021.

KAFTAN TV launched its signals on Thursday, 28 January 2021, on the UK’s BEN TV Sky Channel 195.

== Management ==
KAFTAN TV is owned by Adewole Adebayo a Nigeria Lawyer and Politician and the CEO is Abdulwaheed Odusile the immediate past Commissioner for Information and Strategy in Ogun State.

== Recognition ==
In October 2018, KAFTAN TV was named Best Exhibitor for Public Relations and Media at the Abuja International Trade Fair.

In January 2021, KAFTAN TV received a Distinguished Excellence Award from the Coalition of Civil Societies and Media Executives for Good Governance in Nigeria (COCMEGG) for its "media exploits, advocacy and sensitization campaign on [the] COVID-19 pandemic."

== See also ==
- List of television stations in Nigeria
- List of television networks by country
