= Consolidated Media Associates =

- Company type: Public
- Industry: Mass media
- Founded: 2001; 25 years ago
- Founder: Tajuddeen Adepetu
- Headquarters: Lekki Peninsula, Lagos, Nigeria
- Area served: Worldwide
- Products: Cable television, broadcasting, radio, publishing, movies, Events and Digital
- Subsidiaries: Alphavision Multimedia
- Website: cmagroup.tv

CMA Group (short for Consolidated Media Associates Limited) is a Nigerian global mass media company with interests in broadcasting, print and events management. It is West Africa's largest broadcasting and cable company in terms of airtime sales/syndication and on-air brand management. Consolidated Media Associates has Alphavision Multimedia as subsidiary and a General Media Production and Television powerhouse with footprints in Satellite, Cable, Digital and Terrestrial Television. CMA Group is the parent company for TV channels Soundcity TV, Trybe TV, Televista TV, Spice TV, ONTV Nigeria, ONMAX, VillageSquare TV, Urban96 Radio Network, Access 24 and Televise TV and radio stations Soundcity Radio Network, Access 24 and Urban96 Radio Network. CMA's networks reach approximately 100 million viewers in 70 countries.

Over the last 15 years, CMA has provided television programming on a syndicated basis to television stations across Nigeria and the African continent. More recently, it has produced themed television content to pay television platforms in Nigeria and expanded its distribution network to include satellite stations beyond Nigeria. CMA is the most visible independent Nigerian medium of entertainment programming.

The corporate and operational office of the company is at Lekki Peninsula, Lagos.

== Assets ==
Television networks

- Soundcity TV
- Spice TV
- Televista TV
- Trybe TV
- ONMAX
- ONTV Nigeria
- Access 24 News Network
- Ummah Muslim Lifestyle Channel
- Life Christian Channel
- Xchange TV
- Correct TV
- Urban TV

Radio networks

- Urban96 Radio Network
- Soundcity Radio Network
- Correct FM Network
- Access24 Radio Network

Digital

- Xchange
- Papi Social
- Buddie
- Soundcity Mobile Applications
- Urban96 Mobile Applications

Experientials

- Soundcity MVP
- Spice Lifestyle Honors
- Made in Lagos Festival
- Urban Culture Festival
- Afrobeats Festival
- Soundcity All Stars Party
- Design Fashion Africa Week
- The Intersection
- Game On
- Festival of Flavors
- Spice Xhibit F
- Spice Haute Party
