= China–South Sudan relations =

- China: South Sudan

Diplomatic mission
- Embassy of China, Juba: Embassy of South Sudan, Beijing

China–South Sudan relations refers to the bilateral relations between the People's Republic of China and the Republic of South Sudan. China recognized South Sudan's independence on 9 July 2011.

== History ==
China began friendly exchanges with southern Sudan in 1970s when China sent medical teams and agricultural experts to provide assistance for the people there. In January 2005, China was one of the witnesses to the Comprehensive Peace Agreement signed between the north and the south of Sudan, which ended the 38-year civil war and announced the establishment of the autonomous government of South Sudan. Since then, China has started formal friendly exchanges with South Sudan and the bilateral cooperation in various fields has increased progressively.

In February 2007, Chinese President Hu Jintao made his first visit to Sudan and met in Khartoum with First Vice President Salva Kiir who was also President of the southern autonomous government. Then Kiir visited China twice in March 2005 and July 2007.

In September 2008, China opened the Consulate General in Juba. In February 2011, the Chinese government announced its recognition of the referendum results in Southern Sudan and China was one of the world's first countries to recognize the results. On 9 July 2011, when the Republic of South Sudan was established, China Housing and Urban-Rural Development Minister Jiang Weixin was invited as a special envoy of Hu to participate in the independence celebrations. On behalf of the Chinese government, Jiang signed the Joint Communique on the Establishment of Diplomatic Relations between the two countries with South Sudan's Foreign Minister Deng Alor Kol, meaning that on the founding day of South Sudan, China established official diplomatic relations with the new country and became one of the first countries to establish such a relation with it.

The government of South Sudan states in the Joint Communiqué that there is only one China in the world, the government of the People's Republic of China is the sole legitimate government representing China and Taiwan is an inalienable part of China. On the same day, Chinese Ambassador to South Sudan opened the embassy. From 23 to 26 April in 2012, South Sudan's President Kiir made a state visit to China at the invitation of Hu. During the visit, Hu held talks with Kiir, Other Chinese leaders, including Chairman of the Standing Committee of the National People's Congress Wu Bangguo, and Vice Premier, member of the Standing Committee of the Political bureau of the CPC Central Committee Li Keqiang met with Kiir respectively.

When the South Sudanese Civil War began in December 2013, China adopted a hedging strategy through which it provided financial and other forms of assistance to both the South Sudanese government and opposition forces.

== Sovereignty issues ==
South Sudan follows the one China principle. It recognizes the People's Republic of China as the sole government of China and Taiwan as an integral part of China's territory, and supports all efforts by the PRC to "achieve national reunification". It also considers Hong Kong, Xinjiang and Tibet to be China's internal affairs.

In June 2020, South Sudan was one of 53 countries that backed the Hong Kong national security law at the United Nations.

== Economic relations ==
As of at least 2024, China is South Sudan's largest trading partner. In South Sudan, Chinese companies participate in various economic sectors including engineering, construction, telecommunications, healthcare, hotels, restaurant, and retail.

In 2012, South Sudan and China signed an agreement by which China would renovate and expand Juba International Airport.

In 2014, the two governments signed an agreement which allowed 97% of goods exported from South Sudan to China to be tariff-free.

South Sudan joined the Belt and Road Initiative (BRI) in 2018.

=== Oil ===
Oil exports are critical to South Sudan's economy, accounting for over 90% of South Sudan's revenue. After South Sudan's independence in 2011, South Sudan's territory included many of the Sudanese oil fields where China National Petroleum Company and Sinopec have significant interests.

The December 2013 beginning of the South Sudanese Civil War prompted Chinese policymakers to consider whether to relinquish oil fields and other investments or to continue to maintain them during the conflict. Ultimately, a minimum team of Chinese nationals working for the China National Petroleum Company remained to continue oil production. This decision allowed South Sudan's oil sector to continue to operate although CNPC suffered huge losses given high transportation costs and low international oil prices. Continuing oil production helped China to earn trust from the South Sudanese government and support from the international community for its contribution in stabilizing South Sudan's economy.

=== Chinese development finance to South Sudan ===
Up to 2011, there were approximately five Chinese official development finance projects identified in South Sudan by various media reports. These projects range from assisting in constructing a hospital in Bentiu in 2011, to a grant of 200 million CNY for agriculture, education, health and water supply projects in South Sudan.

From the start of the South Sudanese Civil War until 2017, China provided South Sudan with at least $49 million in humanitarian assistance.

During the 2018 Forum on China-Africa Cooperation summit, Xi Jinping announced an additional grant of RMB 300 million and RMB 100 in emergency food aid to South Sudan.

China has provided assistance to South Sudan for the building of a USD 100 million TV and radio broadcast station in Juba.
