= Access to Satellite TV for 10,000 African Villages =

China–Africa cooperation project

Access to Satellite TV for 10,000 African Villages is a China–Africa cooperation project that aims to reduce the digital divide in African rural areas by giving villages access to digital television. As of April 2019, projects had been completed in sixteen sub-Saharan countries.

== History ==
China's paramount leader Xi Jinping announced that China would implement satellite TV programs for ten thousand African villages on December 4, 2015, when he was delivering a keynote speech at the opening ceremony of the Johannesburg Summit of the Forum on China-Africa Cooperation.

The project, known as "Access to Satellite TV for 10,000 African Villages", is among 10 major cooperation programs to boost cooperation between China and Africa in a period of 3 years.

== Goals ==
Digital Divide is an inequality with regard to access to, use of, or impact of information and communication technologies (ICT). African countries are suffering from the Digital Divide and many Africans, especially families in rural areas, are blocked from accessing information and digital technology.

One of the main goals of the United Nations 2030 Agenda for Sustainable Development is to "significantly increase access to information and communications technology and strive to provide universal and affordable access to the Internet in least developed countries by 2020".

== Benefits ==
=== Population ===
The project will open a window for African rural families. Through television people will be able to acquire more useful information about the world. They will also have access to agriculture, science or sanitation's knowledge which will impact positively their daily lives. This will expand their horizon and help them to get rid of poverty.

Project will also create local jobs. Staff will be hired and trained to maintain hardware and ensure the long-term operation of the project.

=== Countries ===
Knowledge and information villagers will have access to will promote the development of rural areas of each country.

Access to digital TV will also accelerate digital television transition of the participating countries. That will expand coverage area of African local TV stations and promote TV industry's upgrade in Africa.

The project will narrow gaps between countries and regions in Africa, which will reduce inequality between African countries. Digital TV used to be luxury in African markets but the project of "Access to Satellite TV for 10,000 African Villages" will help break the monopoly of digital TV industry as well as promote a balanced development in African region.

== Villages ==
There will be total 10,112 villages in 25 African countries benefiting from the project "Access to Satellite TV for 10,000 African Villages".

The 25 countries are: Nigeria, South Africa, Kenya, Tanzania, Madagascar, Mozambique, Côte d'Ivoire, Malawi, Uganda, Zambia, D.R.C., Guinea, Ghana, Senegal, Cameroon, Rwanda, Burundi, Benin, Eritrea, Chad, Central Africa, Congo Brazzaville, Guinea-Bissau, Namibia and Gabon.

== Equipment ==
Chinese government will aid each village with two Projector TVs, one 32 inch Digital TV set and 20 DTH decoders and satellite dishes. Projector TVs and Digital TV set will be equipped with solar power systems and DTH access units.

The Projector TV can project more than 120 inches picture screen in the wall and use DLP technology and LED light source with high brightness and low power.

The StarTimes Digital TV set supports signal input of satellite TV without a decoder and its smart operation system supports automatic system maintenance and upgrade. Comparing with CRT TV sets, the Digital TV set saves 50% power and comes with HD LED screen category, Dolby audio system, wide voltage input, HDMI and USB ports.

The Projector TVs and Digital TV set will be laid out in the public area of the village, like school or village clinic, which could allow all villagers, especially kids, to enjoy the digital TV programs.

To cope with the problem of power shortage in African rural areas, the Projector TVs and Digital TV set will be outfitted with solar power system, which can support the people to watch TV for 6 hours without electricity after sunset.

The decoders adopt the advanced standard H.265, which can support the input of HD digital signals from the satellite directly.

== Implementation ==
Digital TV operator StarTimes has been chosen to carry out the project under the guide of Chinese and African governments.

StarTimes will supply all hardware of the project, install them in each village of the 25 countries as well as maintain equipment once the project is complete.

== Criticism ==
In Nigeria, some villages lost access to the satellite systems due to malfunctioning equipment and subscription lapses. A private investigation was conducted in November 2023 to examine three villages that received StarTimes kits (Hulumi and Kpaduma in Abuja FCT and Igogo Ekiti in Moba, Ekiti). StarTimes claimed that it implemented access in 1,000 villages, but there is no official data. In the Abuja villages surveyed, locals preferred Chinese channels instead of local channels, such as NTA, AIT and Ecwa TV. There were also people who, thanks to the project, started gaining more favorable views of China, while some beneficiaries continued to favor the US more.
