= StarTimes Sports =

African sports TV network

- Country: China
- Broadcast area: Sub-Saharan Africa
- Affiliates: ESPN beIN Sports
- Headquarters: Beijing

Programming
- Languages: English; French; Portuguese; Swahili
- Picture format: 576i (SDTV); 1080i (HDTV)

History
- Launched: 19 July 2014

Links
- Website: startimestv.com

Availability

Terrestrial
- StarTimes: Varies from country to country

Streaming media
- StarTimes ON

StarTimes Sports is a chain of pay-television sports broadcasting channels operated by StarTimes in sub-Saharan Africa.

== History ==
StarTimes first foray into sports broadcasting was in 2012, when it purchased a package of Italian Serie A games to air one a week on its StarTimes KungFu channel. In 2013 StarTimes purchased a package to air one French Ligue 1 game everyweek also on its StarTimes KungFu channel.

On 19 July 2014, StarTimes Sports 2 was launched as the first channel in the StarTimes Sports channel chain. This was informed due to StarTimes taking in more sporting content as its satellite TV service expanded. The new channel was to air football games from the UEFA Euro 2016 qualifying tournament, the French Ligue 1 and 2014 International Champions Cup.

On 1 June 2015, StarTimes added a third sports channel to the chain, StarTimes Sports Premium, this was after StarTimes Sports Focus was added earlier in the year.

Later on, in August 2015, StarTimes Sports Life and World Football were added to the StarTimes EPG bringing the total number of StarTimes Sports channels to five. StarTimes Sports 2 has since been rebranded to StarTimes Sports Arena.

StarTimes Sports channels also serve as a home for some football club tv channels in sub-Saharan africa, some of which include Barca TV, Roma TV, Chelsea TV, Arsenal TV, MUTV, Dortmund TV and Juventus TV. StarTimes Sports broadcasts a variety of other sporting events apart from association football, ranging from tennis, cricket, rugby, badminton, table tennis, motorsport, boxing and volleyball.

== List of channels ==
- StarTimes Satellite (DTH)
- StarTimes Antenna (DTT)

Channel Name	Channel Number	Packages
StarTimes Sports Focus (Sub Saharan Africa) HD simulcast	240	Special and Smart (DTH)
StarTimes Sports Focus (Sub Saharan Africa) HD simulcast	250	Nova (DTT)
StarTimes Sports Arena (Sub Saharan Africa) HD simulcast	241	Special and Smart (DTH)
StarTimes Sports Arena (Sub Saharan Africa) HD simulcast	251	Basic (DTT)
StarTimes Sports Life (Sub Saharan Africa) HD simulcast	243	Special and Smart (DTH)
StarTimes Sports Life (Sub Saharan Africa) HD simulcast	253	Basic (DTT)
StarTimes Beta Sports (Nigeria Only) HD simulcast	244	Special and Smart (DTH)
StarTimes Beta Sports (Nigeria Only) HD simulcast	244	Classic (DTT)
StarTimes World Football (Sub Saharan Africa) HD simulcast	245	Super (DTH)
StarTimes World Football (Sub Saharan Africa) HD simulcast	254	Classic (DTT)
StarTimes Sports Premium (Sub Saharan Africa) HD simulcast	246	Super (DTH)
StarTimes Sports Premium (Sub Saharan Africa) HD simulcast	252	Classic (DTT)
StarTimes Adepa (Ghana Only) HD simulcast	247	Super (DTH)
StarTimes Adepa (Ghana Only) HD simulcast	247	Classic (DTT)
StarTimes Sports Mania (Mozambique Only) HD simulcast	957	Super (DTH)
StarTimes Sports Mania (Mozambique Only) HD simulcast	453	Classic (DTT)

(Previous Sports Discontinued)

- Sports 1 (South Africa only) HD simulcast
- Sports 2 (South Africa only) HD simulcast
- Sports 3 (South Africa only) HD simulcast
- Sports 4 (South Africa only) HD simulcast

=== StarTimes Sports Focus ===
StarTimes Sports Focus is a channel which broadcasts sports news, highlights and interviews. Its programming also includes, rugby and table tennis. It also acts as a spill over channel for association football when necessary.

=== StarTimes Sports Arena ===
StarTimes Sports Arena is the chain's home for fight events, airing events from promotions like ONE Championship, Bellator MMA, Cage Warriors, Glory (kickboxing) and World Boxing Council. It is also used as a spill over channel for German Bundesliga and French Ligue 1.

=== StarTimes Sports Life ===
StarTimes Sports Life airs the Chinese Super League and Liga MX. It also airs golf, volleyball and X Games. It has aired tennis and cricket in the past and also French Ligue 1.

=== StarTimes Sports Premium ===
StarTimes Sports Premium airs a variety of sports, mainly from association football which include Bundesliga, Ligue 1, La Liga, Campeonato Brasileiro Série A, UEFA Europa League, UEFA Euro Qualifying tournaments and FIFA World Cup and its qualifiers. It has aired Italian Serie A in the past. The channel also airs Basketball events like FIBA World Cup and its qualifiers and the AfroBasket tournament. Motorsport also airs on the channel, from events like Formula E and World Rally Championship.

Since 1 September 2020, it has broadcast programmes exclusively in French. It acts as a French Language simulcast for most football events broadcast on World Football channel and it also serves as the home for the Spanish Laliga on Startimes

=== StarTimes World Football ===
StarTimes World Football is a football only channel. It is the home of the Bundesliga on StarTimes, but also airs Ligue 1, Serie A, FIFA World Cup, UEFA Nations League, FIFA World Cup qualifiers, International Champions Cup, FIFA Club World Cup, UEFA Europa League, FA Cup, Copa del Rey, Coppa Italia, Taça da Liga, Taça de Portugal, and J1 League (only on StarTimes presents J1 League).

=== StarTimes Beta Sports ===
Catch up with Nigeria Premier Football League other sport and NBA Basketball and Extreme Sports.

=== StarTimes Sports Mania ===
The Sports channel has Portuguese contents with all mix Sports and local Football Moçambola League of Mozambique.

=== StarTimes Adepa ===
The Sports channel has Ghanaian local sports content. It mainly serves as the primary channel for the Ghana Premier League.

(Previous Sports Discontinued)

=== Sports 1, 2, 3, & 4 ===
Sports 1, Sports 2 and Sports 3 are StarTimes Sports channels carried on StarTimes' South African subsidiary, StarSat. They basically carry the same programming with the channels in the rest of Sub Saharan Africa, except for the UEFA Europa League and FIFA events which are held by rivals SuperSport in South Africa.

== Sports coverage ==
=== Football (soccer) ===
- FIFA World Cup
- FIFA Women's World Cup
- FIFA Club World Cup (2015–2018, 2025–Present)
- FIFA Beach Soccer World Cup
- Copa America
- UEFA European Championship
- UEFA Nations League (2020—present)
- European Qualifiers (Euro and World Cup Qualifying)
- UEFA Europa League (2018–2021)
- African Cup Of Nations
- African Nations Championship
- CAF Champions League
- CAF Confederations Cup
- AFC Champions League
- AFC Cup
- AFC Asian Cup qualifiers
- Copa Libertadores (2023–Present))
- Bundesliga (2015 – present)
- DFL-Supercup (2015 – present)
- Ligue 1 (2013–2019)
- Coupe de la Ligue (2018–2019)
- Emirates FA Cup (2019–2021)
- FA Community Shield (2019–2021)
- Serie A (2015–2018)
- Coppa Italia (2015 – present)
- Supercoppa Italiana (2015 – present)
- La Liga (2020 – present)
- La Liga SmartBank (Promotion Play-Offs only)
- Copa del Rey (2020–present)
- Supercopa de España
- Liga MX (2020—present)
- Chinese Super League (2016–present)
- Saudi Professional League (2022–present)
- International Champions Cup (2014–2019)
- Ghana Premier League(2018—present)
- Uganda Premier League
- Zambia National Division One
- Kenyan Premier League
- Canadian Premier League (2020)

=== Basketball ===
- FIBA Basketball World Cup
- FIBA Women's Basketball World Cup
- Afrobasket
- AfroBasket Women
- FIBA Under-17 Basketball World Cup
- FIBA Basketball World Cup qualification(Africa Zone/ Involving African Teams)

=== Motorsport ===
- Formula E
- WRC
- Extreme E
- Macau Grand Prix
- British Superbike Championship
- WTCR
- ERC

=== Rugby ===
- Premiership Rugby

=== Athletics ===
- World Athletics Relays
- Valencia Marathon

=== Aquatics ===
- FINA World Aquatics Championships

=== Tennis ===
- Hopman Cup
- ATP Tour 250
- Davis Cup
- Billie Jean King Cup
- Diriyah Tennis Cup

=== Cricket ===
- Bangladesh Premier League
- Pakistan Super League
- European Cricket League

=== Boxing ===
- World Series of Boxing
- WBC Boxing
- WBO Boxing
- World Boxing Super Series

=== Volleyball ===
- FIVB Men's and Women's Nations Leagues

=== Table tennis ===
- Table Tennis World Cup
- ITTF World Tour
- World Table Tennis Championships

=== Badminton ===
- BWF World Tour

=== Golf ===
- PGA Tour Highlights
- LPGA of Korea Tour
- Solheim Cup

=== Kickboxing ===
- Glory
- Enfusion

=== Mixed Martial Arts ===
- Bellator MMA
- Bare Knuckle Fighting Championship
- ONE Championship
- Cage Warriors
- Fight Nights Global

=== Wrestling ===
- Major League Wrestling
- Lucha Libre AAA Worldwide
- TNA Greatest Matches
- World of Sport Wrestling
- Impact Wrestling

== Studio broadcasters/Presensters ==
Name	Role	Note
Lloyd Randall	Anchor	Presenter of Bundesliga Football, UEFA Europa League & Big Rumble
McSwain Betrand	Anchor	Presenter of Bundesliga Football & UEFA Europa League
Micheal Butterworth	Anchor	Presenter of Bundesliga Football & African Cup of Nations
David Ramirez	Analyst	Analyst of Bundesliga Football & Football Moments
Mike Fox	Analyst	Analyst on Bundesliga Football & Football Moments
Josh McNally	Analyst	Analyst on Sports Clash & Big Rumble

== See also ==
- StarTimes
- StarSat
