= Adewole Adebayo =

Nigerian politician, lawyer, and businessman

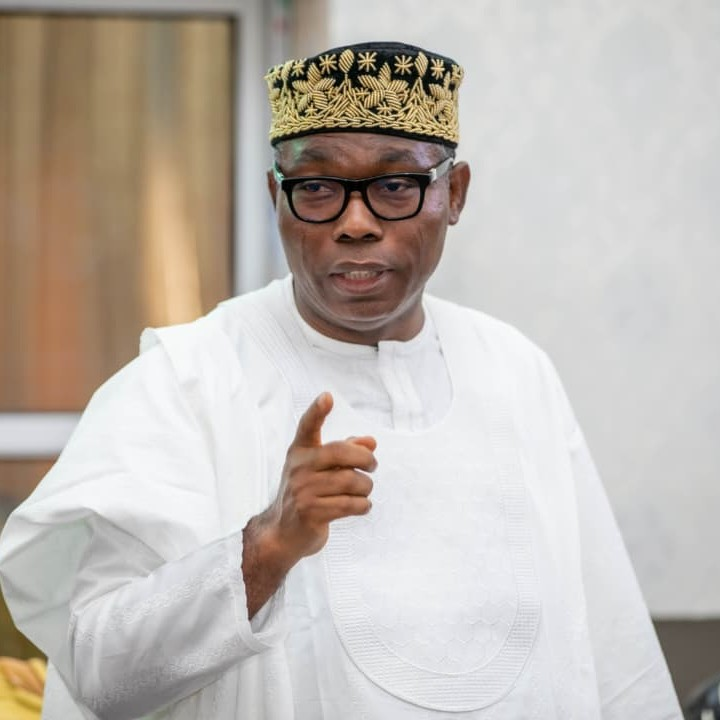
- Born: 8 January 1972 (age 54); Ondo Town, Ondo State, Nigeria
- Education: Obafemi Awolowo University
- Occupations: Political Activist & Lawyer
- Organization: KAFTAN TV
- Political party: Social Democratic Party (Nigeria)

Prince Adewole Adebayo (born 8 January 1972) is a Nigerian political activist, lawyer, and media entrepreneur. He is the presidential candidate for the Social Democratic Party (Nigeria) in the 2027 Nigerian elections and is the founder of KAFTAN TV.

== Early life and education ==
Adebayo was born in Ondo City, Ondo State, on January 8, 1972. He is a member of the Ondo royal family whose family trace their lineage back to 1510.

Between 1978 and 1983, he attended St. Stephen Primary School in Ondo. From 1983 to 1989, he attended St. Joseph College in Ondo. From 1991 to 1997, he attended Obafemi Awolowo University, where he earned a law degree. He was admitted to the Nigerian Bar in 2000 after graduating from the Nigerian Law School in Lagos and passing his bar exams. Adebayo later attended law school in the United States of America, where he passed the New York Bar Exams.

== Legal career ==
Adebayo began his legal career as a litigation lawyer at Tunji Abayomi and Co. in Lagos, Nigeria. After two years of legal practice, he founded his own law firm, Adewole Adebayo & Co., House of Law, in 2002. The firm has earned recognition from the International Financial Law Firm Review (IFLR).

One of the cases handled by his law firm in Nigeria was the case between Femi Falana and the Federal Government, in which Femi Falana (SAN) contested the constitutionality of the contract between the Ministry of Interior, the Nigeria Immigration Service, and Continental Transfert Technique Limited for the collection of Combined Expatriate and Residence Permit Aliens Card (CERPAC) fees. Adebayo represented Continental Transfert Technique Limited in the case.

In 2006, he was appointed by the United Nations and the Economic Community of West African States as a Commissioner on Liberia's Truth and Reconciliation Commission.

Adebayo is listed by the State Bar of California as an active attorney. Public attorney data also identifies an Adewole Ebenezer Adebayo registered in New York. He is listed in the Chartered Institute of Arbitrators member directory as a Fellow, with Nigeria as his primary branch.

== Politics ==
Adebayo became involved in politics in the early 1990s when he joined the SDP as a student, remaining committed to the party ever since. He has been involved in political advocacy, and is a frequent public affairs commentator on national issues, particularly on governance, security, and corruption issues in Nigeria.

Adebayo contested the 2023 Nigerian general election as a presidential candidate for the Social Democratic Party (Nigeria). In May 2026, he was returned unopposed as the SDP's presidential candidate for the 2027 Nigerian general election following the SDP's convention.

== Businesses ==
In 2016, Adebayo founded KAFTAN TV, a Nigerian television network operated by KAFTAN TV Ventures headquartered in Ondo Town, with additional offices in Lagos and Abuja. The network provides news in regional languages, including Hausa and Yoruba. The network broadcasts to more than one million people in Nigeria.

The company has also promoted an apprenticeship and training scheme for young broadcasters which has trained more than 1,000 young people in broadcasting and journalism. He has been recognised by the Nigerian Union of Journalists in connection with his media activities.

In addition to his media organisation, Adebayo has business interests in agriculture and forestry in northern Nigeria including a large-scale tree planting initiative. According to media reports, he is also involved in mining, operating a site in Abuja focused on marble processing.

== Philanthropy ==
Adebayo sponsors nearly 2,000 young Nigerians in Nigerian and foreign tertiary institutions, in addition to numerous people he has financially empowered across the country. He has reportedly provided his home as a refuge for Nigerians escaping religious violence in the country.

Each year, Adebayo hosts an annual marathon on Christmas Day in his hometown of Ondo which sees approximately 5,000 athletes take part from across Nigeria and Africa.
