= Moet Abebe =

Nigerian video jockey, TV presenter, and actress

- Born: Laura Monyeazo Abebe; 29 July 1989 (age 37); United Kingdom
- Education: University of Manchester; Law
- Occupations: Video jockey, Radio Host, Actress, Catering Executive,
- Years active: 2012–present

Laura Monyeazo Abebe (born 29 July 1989), popularly known as Moet Abebe, is a Nigerian video jockey, television presenter, actress, and catering exec.

== Early life ==
Born in the United Kingdom, she went to Corona Ikoyi Primary School for her primary school education, and attended Dowen College for a year for part of her secondary education. From there she went to Woldingham School and St. Teresa's Secondary School also in Surrey where she then did her GCSEs and A-Levels. In 2008 she gained admission into the University of Manchester, where she studied Law. While she was in secondary school she had great interests in a lot of extracurricular activities such as public speaking, acting, athletics and dance which increased and developed her sense of creativity which would be of great advantage to her later in life.

== Career ==
Her journey into the limelight came after she decided to move back to Nigeria in pursuit of a career as a TV presenter. Three months after moving back to Lagos, Nigeria, she attended an audition for Soundcity TV, she sailed through the auditions and started working for Soundcity TV as a TV presenter and producer. She became a very popular face on Soundcity TV as a host of the One On One show, Body & Soul and Global Countdown show.

In 2016, she began her career on Soundcity Radio 98.5 F.M where she handled the afternoon popular show called “The Takeover” from 2 - 6 p.m from Monday to Friday.

In 2023, she announced her exit from Soundcity. She opened her event management and catering company with her mother called LM Occasions.

=== TV and radio presenter ===
Abebe joined Soundcity TV, an urban music television channel, where gained a following. She has featured top Nigeria musicians on her radio show such as Vector (rapper), 2Baba, Olamide, Chidinma and D'banj.

=== Actress ===
Abebe showed her versatility in entertainment when she acted in a few movies and TV series which include Red Card, Oasis and Living Arrangement. her acting has given her an edge in the Nigeria entertainment and media industry.

=== Events and red carpets ===
Abebe has graced many red carpet events, some as a guest and others as the host of the red carpet, she has been awarded by Meets Media as "Personality of the Month" and has been nominated for several awards such as "TV presenter of the year" by Exquuisite Magazine and many more.
