= Ogun State Broadcasting Corporation =

Coordinates: 7.1254°N 3.3362°E

OGBC
- Ogun State; Nigeria
- Frequency: 90.5 MHz

Programming
- Languages: English, Yoruba
- Format: News, talk, and drama

Ownership
- Owner: Ogun State Government

History
- First air date: 2 February 1977
- Former frequencies: AM (1977–1991)

Links
- Website: Official website

The Ogun State Broadcasting Organization, also known by its acronym OGBC, is the public-service broadcaster of Ogun State, Nigeria. The OGBC operates a radio station on 90.5 MHz in the state capital of Abeokuta.

== See also ==
- Ogun State Television
