= Nelson Aluya =

Nigerian-American physician

- Born: February 10, 1969 (age 57); Benin City, Edo State, Nigeria
- Education: Ahmadu Bello University
- Occupation: Physician
- Organization(s): Nigerian-American Public Affairs Committee; Association of Nigerian Physicians in the Americas

Nelson Oke Aluya is a Nigerian-American physician (pediatrics and Internal medicine). He is the chief medical director of the Newark community health center in New Jersey and an assistant professor of medicine and pediatrics at the Rutgers University Medical School, Newark. He served as an attending physician at the Newark Beth Israel Medical center and as the medical director of the Newark Extended Care Facility. Aluya is the president of the Nigerian-American Public Affairs Committee, USA; a former chairman of the Association of Nigerian Physicians in the Americas' (ANPA) New Jersey Chapter, and a former president of the New Jersey Medical Association. He is a member of the American Medical Association, the American Board of Pediatrics, and the American College of Healthcare Executives. Aluya has written numerous articles, raised funds for international medical missions, and advocated for cultural events and pro-black political interests.

== Background and education ==
Aluya was born on February 10, 1969 in Benin City, Edo State, Nigeria. He hails from Isoko in Delta State, Nigeria. He graduated with a Bachelor of Medicine and Surgery degree from Ahmadu Bello University, Zaria in October 1998, immediately afterwards commencing his housemanship/internship at the Ahmadu Bello University Teaching Hospital until October 1999. From June 2004 to June 2005, he was an intern in medicine/pediatrics at the Newark Beth Israel Medical Center, and he did his residency at the same center (June 2005-June 2008).

== Career ==
Aluya was appointed assistant professor of medicine and pediatrics at the Rutgers University Medical School and attending physician at the University Hospital in 2008. Aluya served as the medical director of the Sinai Sub-acute Rehabilitation Center. He was also a medical officer under Caduceus with the Center for Disease Control’s (CDC) Newark Quarantine Center from March 2015 to May 2016, where, according to the Nigerian American Public Affairs Committee Foundation, he carried out "Tertiary screening, contact risk stratification and disposition of the highly contagious Ebola virus" on individuals who had traveled to designated Ebola risk zones. He was appointed the chief medical officer of the Newark community health center in May 2022. He is on the advisory board of the Women Leaders in Action organization. In June 2023, during the World Drug Day in Nigeria, Aluya advised the federal government of Nigeria to employ data in the fight against drug use disorder (also known as substance use disorder), drug abuse, and mental health among youths. He became the president of Nigerian-American Public Affairs Committee and reaffirmed the group's commitment to advocating for policies and engaging in politics to "inform, educate, and empower the African Diaspora community". Aluya founded the Young Professionals Leadership Agenda (YPLA).

== Recognition ==
In February 2024, Aluya became the recipient of the Black History Month award. He is the recipient of many other awards, including the "Service above Self" award granted by the Rotary Club of Irvington, New Jersey, USA, Paramount Care Centers' Humanitarian Award, and the "African Entertainment Humanitarian" Award. He also received a nomination for the Golden Apple Award for Excellence in Teaching and was a host of the 2020 and 2021 African Entertainment Awards USA. The "Dr. Nelson Aluya scholarship award" is dedicated in his honor. In 2017, he was recognized for Achievement Service by the mayor of the City of Orange, New Jersey, and in 2021, US-based Nigerians honoured Aluya and others during a gathering in New Jersey.

== Select publications ==
- Aluya, Nelson et al. (2021). "Readability Assessment of Internet-Based Patient Education Materials on Anticoagulation Therapy" Biomedical Journal of Scientific and Technical Research, August 4.
