= Diego Odoh Okenyodo =

Nigerian writer

Odoh Diego Okenyodo
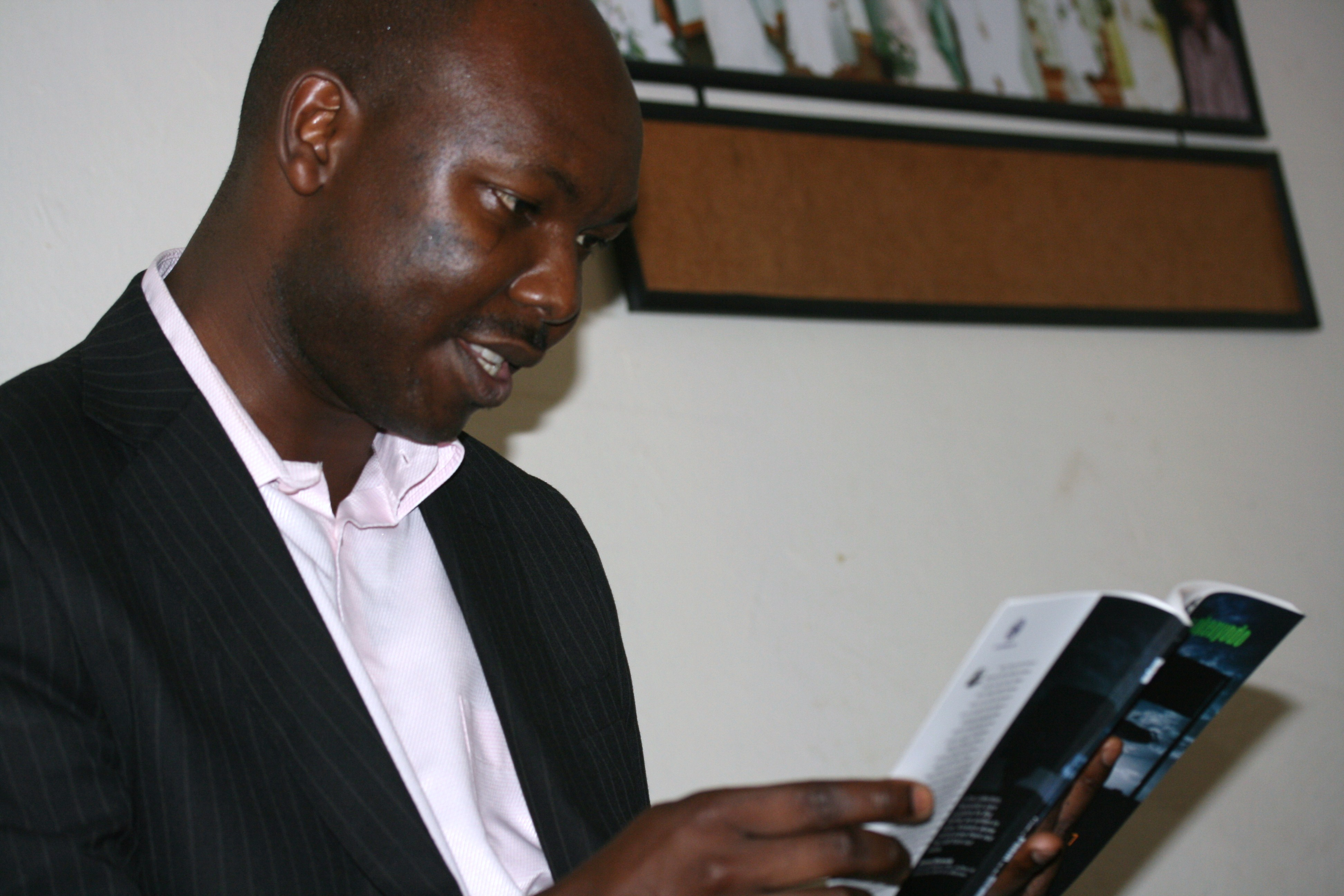
- Reading from A Poem to its Creator
- Born: 2 December 1974; Otukpo, Benue State, Nigeria
- Education: Ahmadu Bello University (ABU) Zaria
- Occupations: Writer, Pharmacist, Activist Poet and Journalist
- Notable work: A Poem to its Creator
- Spouse: Oluwakemi

Odoh Diego Okenyodo (born December 2, 1974) is a Nigerian writer, journalist, development communication expert, media strategist, poet, and media entrepreneur. He is the founder and chief executive officer of Akweya TV Limited, a participatory media organisation focused on language promotion and community dialogue, and Isu Media Ltd, a public relations and communication consulting firm headquartered in Abuja, Nigeria. Okenyodo was one of the founding members of the Kaduna Writers’ League and has served as a director of the Splendors Of Dawn Poetry Foundation. With Prof Nduka Otiono, he co‑edited Camouflage: Best of Contemporary Writing from Nigeria, an anthology of contemporary Nigerian writers. The anthology included works by the most renowned contemporary Nigerian writers such as Chimamanda Ngozi Adichie and Helon Habila.

== Biography ==
=== Early life ===
Born on 2 December 1974 in St. Theresa's Hospital, Otukpo, Benue State, Nigeria, Okenyodo attended the Ahmadu Bello University (ABU) Zaria where he led a literary collective known as the Creative Writers' Club. As a result of his activities in the club, he was expelled by the military administration of Major General Mamman Kontagora, a military administrator who was foisted on the institution in 1995 following a violent conflict in the university.

Okenyodo was reinstated in 2001, after three years battling the university authorities in court and at various panels, including the famous "Oputa Panel". During period out of the university, he lived on his writings and literary performances.

=== Career ===
In September 1999, the Weekly Trust engaged him as freelance correspondent, which marked the formal beginning of a long-incubating career in journalism. Earlier at the ABU Zaria, Okenyodo contributed to and edited some campus magazines.

On the 23rd of June 2001, Okenyodo, working with colleagues—Sumaila Umaisha, Aba Ejembi, Jerome Ajayi—founded the Kaduna Writers' League. Also the Kaduna Writers' League's chairman from inception to the year 2006, Okenyodo led the editorial team of After the curfew, an anthology of creative writings drawn from the League's five-year collection of a weekly bulletin known as Crocodile.

He was elected National Publicity Secretary of the Association of Nigerian Authors (ANA) in November 2003, serving till November 2007. In December 2010, he was appointed chairman of the local organising committee of the association's 30th anniversary convention scheduled to hold in Abuja in October 2011. Okenyodo is a member of the Nigerian Institute of Public Relations (NIPR), Abuja, serving in the publicity and public relations committee.

In 2006, Odoh Diego Okenyodo had relocated from Kaduna to work with the Abuja-based Alliance for Credible Elections as Media Coordinator. From the alliance of civil society organisations, he got employed with the Centre for Democracy and Development (CDD) as a senior programme officer responsible for the organisation's communication.

In January 2009, in search of private-sector experience, he moved to CMC Connect Burson-Marsteller (Perception Managers) to head the marketing communication firm's public affairs office based in Abuja. He is now managing director of Isu Media Ltd, an Abuja-based public relations and copyediting firm.

Odoh was part of the British Council/Lancaster University's Crossing Borders literary mentorship programme in 2005 and the InWent's Measuring Democracy, Governance and Human Rights course in Namibia (2008). He has worked on freelance-writer basis for the BBC World Service Trust, ActionAid, Coalitions for Change, Centre for Democracy and Development, Civil Society Legislative Advocacy Centre, etc.

== Works ==
His book of poems, intriguingly titled A Poem to its Creator, was released in March 2009 by Hybun Publications International to high critical acclaim. "Okenyodo's poetic exploration can be described as eclectic as he uses poetry to make social comments, admonish and define poetry itself," a critic says of the collection. Another says: "Going through Okenyodo’s poetry, you are knocked into place."

== Awards and Honour ==
- A Poem to its Creator was shortlisted for the US$50,000 The Nigeria Prize for Literature in 2009.
- In February 2021, Okenyodo was given an award for his contributions to art administration in Nigeria during the annual Hadiza Ibrahim Aliyu Schools Festival organised by the Hill-Top Creative Arts Foundation, Minna, Niger State, Nigeria.
