= Ogun State Television =

- Type: State-owned enterprise
- Country: Nigeria
- Availability: Africa
- Founded: December 25, 1981 by Ogun State Government
- Owner: Ogun State
- Official website: Official website

Ogun State Television also known by its acronym OGTV is a Nigerian satellite television station owned by the Ogun State Government. It was established on December 25, 1981 as a public corporation.

In 2013, the station was targeted by attacks from Living Faith Church Worldwide, who assaulted OGTV reporter Peter Falomo and his cameraman Lekan Egunjobi. The camera was seized and wasn't released until footage of the beatings was erased.

Tunde Oladunjoye is the board chairman of the station.

== See also ==
- Ogun State Broadcasting Corporation
