= Soundcity Radio Network =

Coordinates: 26.1859°S 28.0094°E

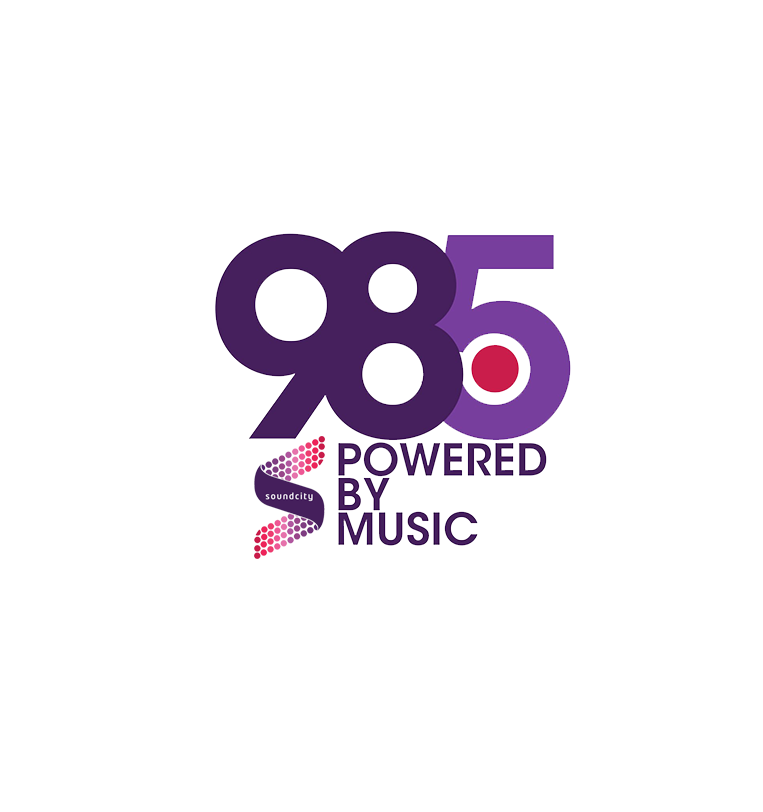
- Nigeria
- Frequencies: various nationwide, 98.5 FM in Lagos

Programming
- Format: CHR (Contemporary hit radio)

Ownership
- Owner: Consolidated Media Associates

History
- First air date: July 18, 2016

Links
- Webcast: Webcast
- Website: www.soundcity.tv

Soundcity Radio Network is a Nigerian FM radio and nationwide digital radio station that follows a Top 40 music format and is owned by Alphavision Multimedia, a subsidiary of the Consolidated Media Associates (CMA). Headquartered in Lagos, Nigeria, Soundcity Radio Network broadcasts nationally to a youth audience.

Soundcity Radio Network music quota leans more to Nigerian music with over 70% of music played from local artists and 30% split between other African and Foreign music.

== 98.5 Lagos Launch ==
Test transmissions for the first station for the Soundcity Radio Network, in Lagos, began in the first quarter of 2016, but programming and OAPs went on-air on 18 July. Other OAPs followed with four hour shifts each.

== Coverage areas and frequencies ==
Soundcity has transmitters serving these areas:

Area	Frequency
Lagos	98.5 MHz
Abuja	96.3 MHz
Port Harcourt	96.5 MHz
Kano	91.3 MHz
Enugu	91.1 MHz
Uyo	Yet to Launch

== Notable current presenters ==
- Sheye Banks (What's Up Lagos)
- Moet Abebe (The TakeOver)
- Pearl Cardy (The WKND Central)
- Dj Kaywise (Thursday nights)
- Osato EDK (What's Up Abuja, Top 20 Nigeria)
- Blessing Imonikhe (Home Run ABJ)
