= StarTimes =

Chinese electronics and media company operating in Africa

- Native name: 四达时代
- Type: Private
- Industry: Pay TV; Information and communications technology
- Founded: 1988; 38 years ago
- Founder: Pang Xinxing
- Headquarters: Beijing, China
- Area served: Africa
- Products: StarSat; TopStar; StarTimes DTT; StarTimes ON; StarTimes GO
- Number of employees: 5,000
- Website: startimestv.com

StarTimes is a Chinese electronics and media company based in Sub-Saharan Africa.

StarTimes offers digital terrestrial television and satellite television services to consumers, and provides technologies to countries and broadcasters that are switching from analog to digital television. As of July 2020, StarTimes has distributors in 37 countries, serving 13 million DVB subscribers and 20 million OTT users.

== History ==
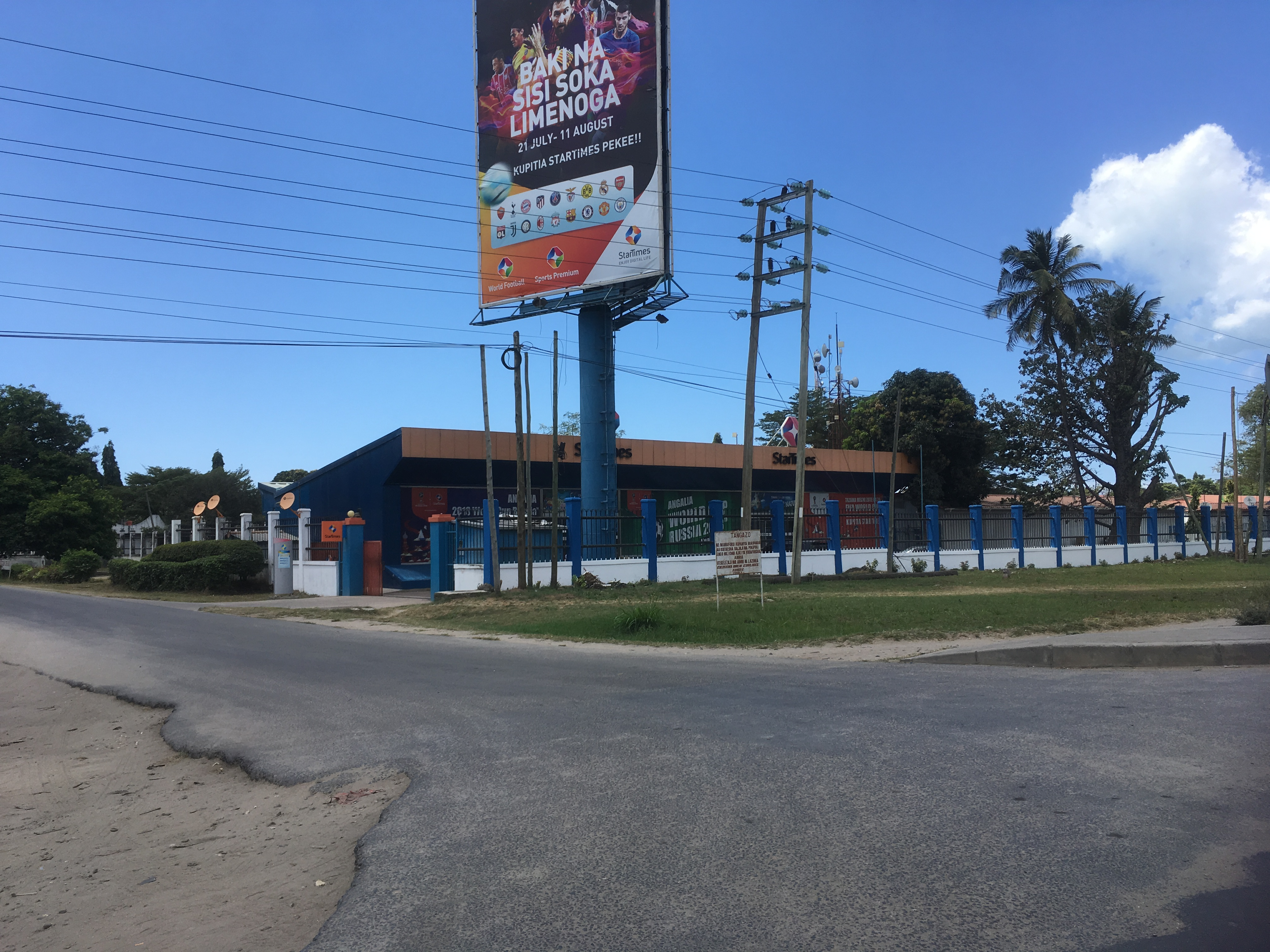
StarTimes Office in Dar es Salaam, Tanzania

StarTimes Group was founded in 1988 by Chinese engineer Pang Xinxing, who is also the company's current chairman. In 2002, StarTimes began to expand its business to Africa. In 2007, it became the first digital television operator licensed by Rwanda. As of 2020, StarTimes has established distributors in 37 countries.

In 2009, StarTimes and the Tanzania Broadcasting Corporation formed a joint venture to roll out digital migration. In the same year, it announced its expansion to other countries of the East African Community. The investments in Kenya, Tanzania and Uganda combined were higher than Rwanda's. In February 2016, StarTimes was awarded a DTH license in Ivory Coast. Operations began in October 2016.

On November 23, 2016, StarTimes was one of the three companies selected by the Pakistan Electronic Media Regulatory Authority (PEMRA) to establish and operate DTH distribution services in Pakistan for 15 years. But due to corruption and incompetency PEMRA delayed almost a decade to launch DTH in Pakistan, StarTimes withdrew application of launching DTH in Pakistan. On 2 September 2017, the Government of Chad and StarTimes signed an agreement on digital migration. After a lengthy process, StarTimes was chosen to build a Digital Terrestrial Television network that will include digitization of national infrastructures, television broadcast and reception. In 2018, StarTimes began to implement "Access to satellite TV for 10,000 African villages", a China-Africa cooperation project aimed at giving rural areas of Africa access to digital media.

In 2017, the Zambia National Broadcasting Corporation (ZNBC) and StarTimes launched TopStar Communication Company Limited, a public signal distributor and Zambia's official digital migration agent, as a joint-venture.

In June 2018, StarTimes launched ON, a video streaming service (OTT) giving access to dozens of channels in Africa.

In 2020, StarTimes e-shopping platform, StarTimes GO was launched. This interactive online shopping platform is supported by TV, Online and Phone call services and available across Africa.

=== Seminar ===
In 2011, StarTimes hosted the first African Digital TV Development Seminar, which has been held for seven consecutive years; it is a talking shop for African countries to discuss digital migration in Africa. The 8th edition of the Seminar held in Beijing in June 2018 had over 400 delegates, dignitaries, heads of broadcasting corporations and guests from 48 African and Asian countries.

=== Sports broadcasting ===
In 2015, StarTimes signed an exclusive broadcasting contract with the Bundesliga for five years in all sub-Saharan countries, on its StarTimes Sports channels, becoming Bundesliga's partner in Africa. This resulted in StarTimes and DFL Deutsche Fussball Liga organizing the StarTimes-Bundesliga Legends Tour where Bundesliga players like Lothar Matthäus, Jay-Jay Okocha and Sunday Oliseh visit African countries every year. In December 2015, Jay-Jay Okocha and Sunday Oliseh visited Nigeria, Ghana and Kenya.

In 2015, StarTimes obtained the rights to televise French Ligue 1 and Italian Serie A in Sub-Saharan countries. In July 2015, it signed a five-year broadcasting contract for the International Champions Cup (ICC). In June 2016, StarTimes also signed a three-year exclusive broadcasting contract with the Chinese Super League for Sub-Saharan Africa.

In November 2016, StarTimes Group signed a media agreement with Ghana Football Association to promote the Ghana Premier League in Sub-Saharan Africa and the infrastructural development of the game in the West African country during the coming decade. In January 2020, one month after losing the franchise, StarTimes won the bid and was named as Television Rights Holder of the Ghana Premier League and the FA Cup.

In April 2017, StarTimes secured media rights for 2018 FIFA World Cup in Russia and the other 2017-2018 FIFA events in all 42 territories of Sub-Saharan Africa (except for the World Cup 2018 and the FIFA Confederations Cup Russia 2017 in South Africa). StarTimes also signed a partnership with Ivoirian football club ASEC Mimosas. On 19 July 2017, StarTimes acquired exclusive media rights in Sub-Saharan Africa for FIBA's national team competitions from 2017 to 2021, including the 2019 FIBA Basketball World Cup in China.

On 9 August 2018, StarTimes and Federation of Uganda Football Associations (FUFA) announced that StarTimes acquired both the naming and broadcast rights of the Uganda Premier League and FUFA Big League for a 10 years period. In September 2018, StarTimes launched a live telecast of UEFA Europa League. StarTimes will broadcast UEFA Europa League in all Sub-Saharan Africa except South Africa, Lesotho and Swaziland. It has been awarded exclusive rights for English, Portuguese and local languages in English-speaking and Portuguese-speaking areas until 2021. In November 2018, StarTimes acquired exclusive media rights to Coppa Italia and Supercoppa Italiana in Sub-Saharan Africa, ending in the 2020/2021 season.

In August 2019, StarTimes announces it acquired UEFA National Team Football broadcasting rights between 2019 and 2022, including UEFA Euro 2020 as well as Qualifiers to Euro 2020, UEFA Nations League 2020/21 and European Qualifiers to 2022 FIFA World Cup. All national friendlies are also part of the contract.

In early August 2020, StarTimes acquired Spanish top league LaLiga Santander broadcasting rights until 2024 across sub-Saharan Africa.

Later the same year, Football Kenya Federation (FKF) unveiled StarTimes as their official broadcasting partners for the FKF Premier League, while the Football Association of Zambia (FAZ) signed a tripartite broadcast sponsorship deal with ZNBC and TopStar (StarTimes) resulting in National Division One matches being shown live on TV.

In January 2021, The Confederation Africaine de Football (CAF) officialized the signing of an agreement by which StarTimes obtains the broadcasting rights for the Total African Nations Championship, Cameroon 2020 (Total CHAN Cameroon 2020).

== Products ==
StarTimes Solar Home System includes a suit of solar panel and battery, 4 LED lights, a digital TV set, a suit of satellite TV access equipment, and two years of pay-TV subscription.

In 2016, StarTimes launched a digital television that supports signal inputs of both terrestrial digital television (DTT) and satellite television (DTH) without a decoder. Africa is going through digital television migration.

StarTimes developed 2-in-1 combo decoders or Dual Mode Decoders that can support both DTT and DTH services which were not common in some decoders.

StarTimes Projector TV can project a greater-than-120 in (300 cm) picture onto a wall using DLP technology and LED light source. External devices like DVD players, decoders, and computers can be connected.

== Philanthropy ==
During the Ebola epidemic in 2014, StarTimes launched several operations in Guinea and Nigeria to raise awareness among local population. In Guinea, StarTimes made a video about Ebola virus and precautionary measures, and distributed sanitation materials to the local communities. In Nigeria, StarTimes produced educational materials, distributed gloves and masks, and put Ebola prevention info on its website and Facebook account.

On 12 May 2017, the Joint United Nations Programme on HIV/AIDS (UNAIDS) and StarTimes signed a memorandum of cooperation that made official a cooperation that started a year before "to reduce the impact of HIV across Africa by disseminating messages to the general public to increase awareness of HIV and UNAIDS’ work and reduce stigma and discrimination of people living with HIV and populations affected by HIV". The first act of this cooperation was on World AIDS Day, 1 December 2016, when StarTimes broadcast UNAIDS' HIV prevention videos on its African networks in English and French until the end of the month.

On 14 May 2018 in Nairobi, Kenya, StarTimes and SOS Children's Villages International signed a Memorandum of Understanding (MOU) that will see the organizations partner towards supporting vulnerable families and children, with an emphasis on empowering youth in light of the United Nations Sustainable Development Goals (SDGs).

== Criticism and controversy ==
On 8 October 2018, British newspaper Financial Times reported increase in Zambia's monthly television levy that funds the country's state broadcaster Zambia National Broadcasting Corporation (ZNBC), allegedly a result of a joint venture between StarTimes and ZNBC, which established a joint venture named TopStar, of which StarTimes owns 60%, to operate multi-channel television services in the country, and was backed by the Export–Import Bank of China. ZNBC borrowed US$273 million from this bank, but it is rumored it could not repay the debt and it was alleged that the broadcaster increased the monthly levy to clear its debt. The Financial Times has also reported about other practices related to China's debt-trap diplomacy and the Chinese Embassy in the UK have since issued counterclaims.

Multiple outlets have also claimed that StarTimes is promoting news content that favours the Chinese government by placing China Global Television Network channels on the platform's most cheapest package, while other international news channels, such as BBC World News, cost even more. On many of its in-house channels, regardless of genre, the platform airs programming about the Chinese Communist Party and its activities in China, offering prizes to entrants who answer questions about China and its history.

Nigerian research published in 2024 shows the "Access to satellite TV for 10,000 African villages" project that StarTimes initiated does not have the impact it promotes, while most of the equipments in Nigeria went idled due to unable to pay subscription fees after the one-year trial and lack of electricity.

== Channels ==
Channels from the Antenna DTT consists of four packages Nova and Basic and Classic and Super-T

=== Nova Package ===
Channel Name	Channel Number
ST GUIDE	001
ST KUNGFU	150
ST DADIN KOWA	162
ST SPORTS FOCUS	250

=== Basic Package ===
Channel Name	Channel Number
ST NOVELA E	53
ST ZONE	54
ST AFRIK	66
ST YORUBA	160
ST RISE	211
ST SPORTS ARENA	251
ST SPORTS LIFE	253
ST KIDS	350
ST GOSPEL	360
ST KASI MUSIC	402
ST NAIJA	403

=== Classic Package ===
Channel Name	Channel Number
ST MOVIES PLUS	10
ST MOVIES	11
ST NOLLYWOOD PLUS	13
ST NOVELA E PLUS	57
ST SINO DRAMA	58
ST BETA SPORTS	244
ST ADEPA	247
ST SPORTS PREMIUM HD	252
ST WORLD FOOTBALL HD	254
ST TOONS	351
ST MANIA	453

=== Satellite Channel ===
Channels from the Satellite DTH consists of six packages Nova and Smart and Super and Special and Chinese and Combo French Classic.

Channel Name	Channel Number
ST GUIDE FRENCH	002
ST GUIDE ENGLISH	99
ST MOVIES PLUS	100
ST MOVIES	101
ST NOLLYWOOD PLUS	102
ST RISE	120
ST NOVELA E W	127
ST NOVELA E	127
ST NOVELA E PLUS	128
ST ZONE	129
ST SINO DRAMA	130
ST KUNGFU	155
ST REMBO PLUS	166
ST NOLLYWOOD	131
ST SPORTS FOCUS	240
ST SPORTS ARENA	241
ST SPORTS LIFE	243
ST BETA SPORTS	244
ST WORLD FOOTBALL	245
ST SPORTS PREMIUM	246
ST ADEPA	247
ST KIDS	300
ST TOONS	310
ST KIDS PLUS	311
ST RnB	321
ST KASI MUSIC	322
ST NAIJA	324
ST GOSPEL	360
ST SWAHILI	400
ST BONGO	401
ST SWAHILI PLUS	402
ST DADIN KOWA	404
ST YORÙBÁ	412
ST GANZA	460
ST REMBO	484
ST MAKULA	492
ST MAKULA KIKA	493
ST AM'MOBI	527
ST AFRIK	612
ST NOVELA F PLUS	615
ST NOLLYWOOD F	616
ST NOVELA F	617
ST CHINESE HOMELAND	800
ST NOVELA P	881
ST MANIA	957

== See also ==
- StarSat: StarTimes owns 20% of stakes of the South African satellite television provider.
