= ONTV Nigeria =

Nigerian television channel

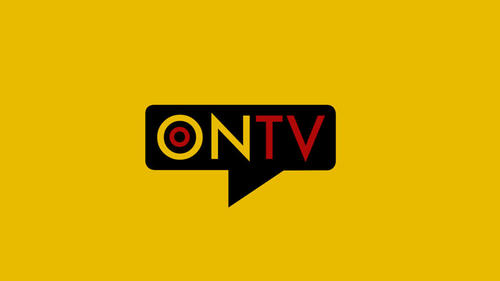
- Country: Nigeria
- Broadcast area: Worldwide
- Headquarters: Lagos, Lagos State, Nigeria

Programming
- Language: English

Ownership
- Owner: Tajuddeen Adepetu ("Consolidated Media Associates")

History
- Launched: 2011

Links
- Webcast: Watch live (Available worldwide)
- Website: ontvsite.com

Availability

Terrestrial
- UHF: Channel 41 (Lagos)

ONTV Nigeria is an independent terrestrial television channel based in Lagos, Nigeria.

Operating in Nigeria's popular broadcast media market, ONTV is the first channel to hold ratings as the most watched Terrestrial TV channel in Lagos.

== Recognition and programming ==
Since 2013, ONTV has been rated the most watched terrestrial TV channel in Lagos by several Lagos based Ad agencies including Media Perspective. ONTV broadcast new episodes of five telenovelas from Ka sam Se, Alma Indomable, Punar Vivah, El Secretario to Tomorrow Belongs to Me which replaced Avenida Brasil (TV series) with live broadcast of the EPL matches every Saturday, Sporting news headlines provided by OmniSports, music and lifestyle shows like Hitz OnTV and other Soundcity TV programming with evenings full of indigenous TV drama series from Funke Akindele's 'Jenifa's Diary' to Squatterz, Meet the Adebanjos, Spider, Fuji House of Commotion, Plus 234 and fashion-themed shows from Spice TV.

== ONMAX ==
On the 11 of June 2015, ONTV launched on DStv channel 257 and GoTV Channel 96, continuing in broadcasting other syndicated contents from other CMA Group channels on the Dstv and GOtv bouquet. At launch, its key contents were telenovelas and sports.

== See also ==
- List of television stations in Nigeria
- List of news channels
- List of television networks by country
