= Televista TV =

Nigerian television network

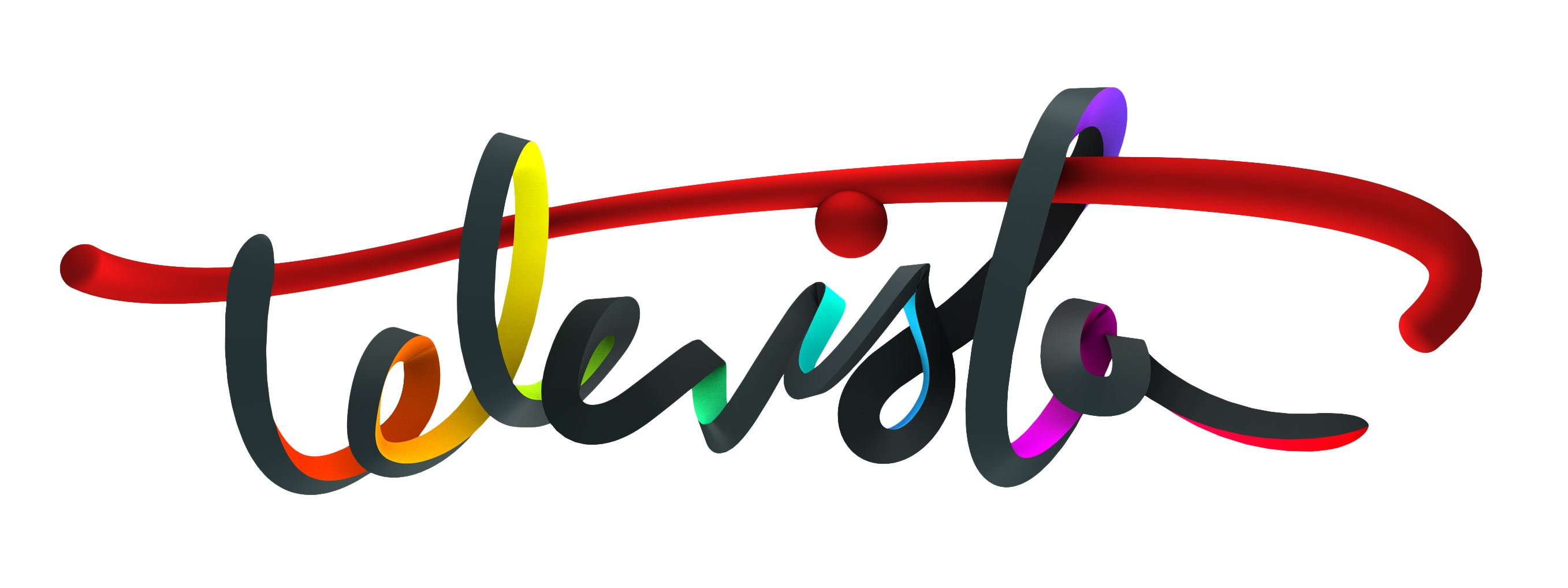
- Country: Nigeria
- Broadcast area: Nationwide
- Headquarters: Lagos, Nigeria

Programming
- Language: English
- Picture format: 1080i/720p (HDTV); 480i (SDTV)

Ownership
- Owner: CMA Group (Consolidated Media Associates)

History
- Launched: 2006; 2014 (as a television network; on GoTV)

Links
- Website: www.televistaonline.tv (main network website)

Availability

Terrestrial
- ONTV Nigeria: Channel 41

Televista TV is a Nigerian English-language broadcast television network owned by the Consolidated Media Associates. The network broadcasts programmes, including several produced by the network itself, aimed at Nigerian and English speaking audience in Nigeria and around the world – featuring a mix of news programming, local drama, reality television series and telenovelas (both English-dubbed versions of Colombian, Filipino, Brazilian, Latin America and other imported telenovelas produced in Spanish-speaking countries).

Televista Digital Media, which distributes original programming content across digital and mobile platforms including iROKOtv while sourcing for the best content from all around the world to a demographic that includes Housewives and students to the less obvious (middle management to top management executives). As of November 2010, Televista had twelve Mexican titles yet to air. These titles were exclusive to Televista, and were refused to air on free-to-air television.

The channel was made available on GOtv's Nigerian service in its 2013-2014 rollout.
