= Trybe TV =

Nigerian television network

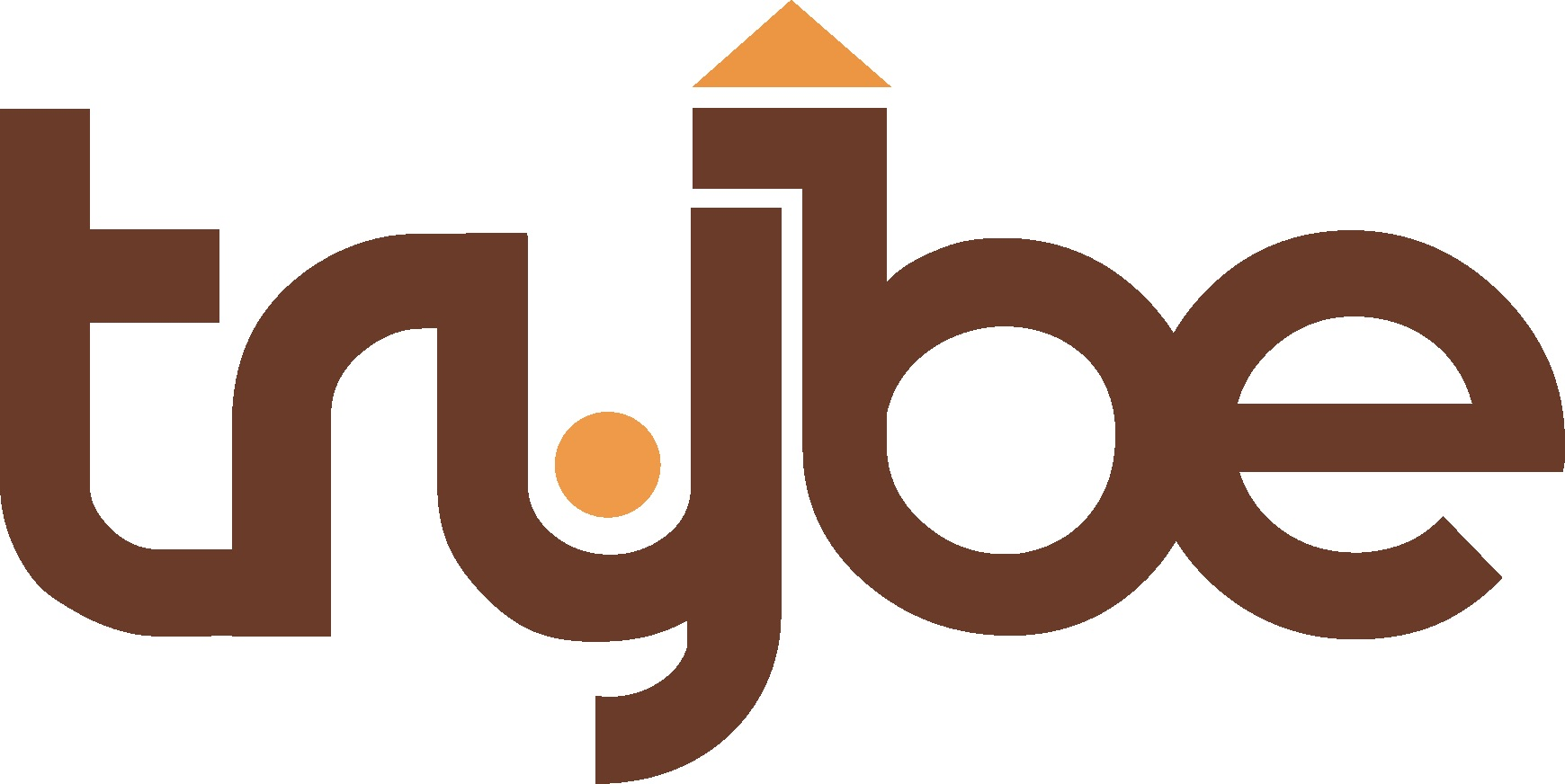
- Country: Nigeria
- Headquarters: Lagos

Programming
- Picture format: 576i - 4:3 (SDTV); 1080i - 16:9 (HDTV)

Ownership
- Owner: Consolidated Media Associates
- Sister channels: VillageSquare TV

History
- Launched: 26 November 2015

Links
- Website: trybes.tv

Availability

Terrestrial
- GoTV (Nigeria): Channel 97

Trybe TV is a 24 hours Nollywood movie channel owned by CMA Group. On 25 November 2015, Trybe TV was launched as a movie channel with Nollywood, Ghollywood and Yoruba speaking movies interposed with original lifestyle programming available in Nigeria on DSTV and GOTV.

== Overview ==
Trybe TV launched on the MultiChoice DTT platform, GoTV airing movies from Nigerian, Ghanaian and Yoruba-speaking actors and actresses. At 12 noon (WAT) on 17 November 2016, it launched on DSTV with the channel number 195. In addition to Nollywood movies, it also airs original series and short films, behind the scenes from movie sets, red carpet events (such as the Africa Movie Academy Awards) and interviews with stakeholders in the movie industry.

It was available only in Nigeria as soon as it was launched with expansion to other countries in the year.
