= Spice TV =

African fashion television channel

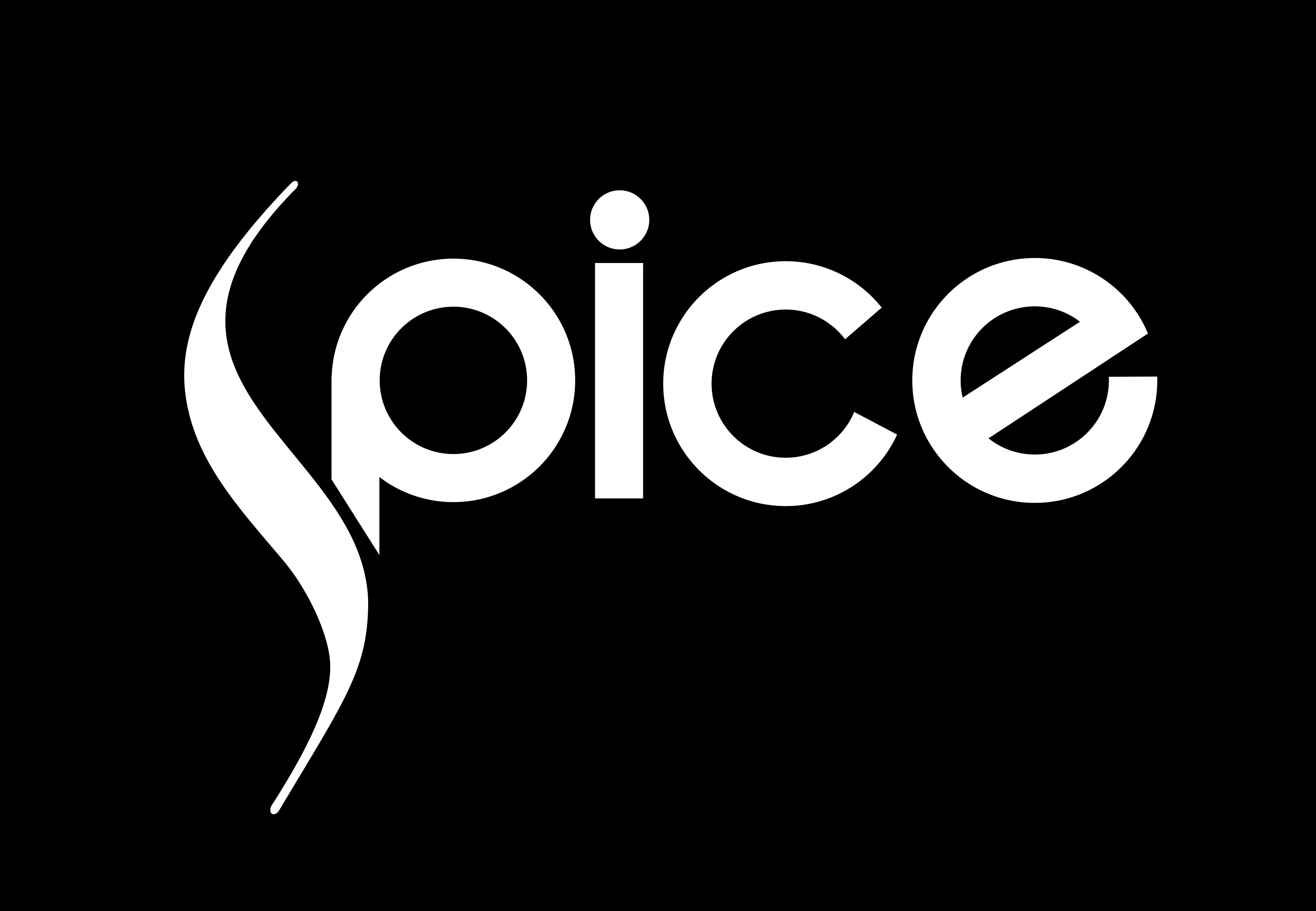
- Country: Nigeria
- Broadcast area: Continental
- Headquarters: Lekki Peninsula, Lagos

Programming
- Picture format: 480i (SDTV)

Ownership
- Owner: Consolidated Media Associates

History
- Launched: November 5, 2013

Links
- Website: Spice TV

Spice TV (officially named Spice Fashion Television Channel) is Africa's first dedicated English-language specialty channel for fashion, owned by Consolidated Media Associates. The channel broadcasts both local and international programming related to fashion, modeling, photography, beauty, luxury, and lifestyle on DStv channel 190. Before launch as a 24-hours television channel on Multichoice multi-channel digital satellite TV service, it was syndicated on free-to-air TV channel OnTV Nigeria and still runs select programming blocks every day on OnTV Nigeria and ONMAX. Spice TV is also responsible for the annual Spice Haute Party.

With strategic partnerships, Spice TV has spotlighted local and international fashion weeks including from Major African hot shots like Nigeria, Ghana, South Africa to the unveiling of seasonal collections in the last two years of existence.

== Spice TV's original programmes ==
- Urban Spice
- Glam Mamas
- On the Couch
- Spice Toys
- Spice Destination
- Spice TV Runway Fiesta
- Digital Dairies
- The Red Carpet Show
- Style 101
- Spice Street Style
- The LookBook

Henry The NOT Rich And Famous Boy (TV Series In Nigeria Then Later On Nicktoons In 2011)

- Fashion Short Films
- Dairy of a Muse

== Spice TV Runway Fiesta ==
Spice TV Runway Fiesta, popularly known as "Runway Fiesta" is an event made for TV to celebrate one designer, one artist and top models. Designers presented exclusive collection with models on her to wear and walk them on the runway as artist perform to the audience. From designers Kinabuti, Wana Sambo, Tzar, Remi Buttons to artists like Bez, Victoria Kimani and Black Magic.

== Spice Haute Party ==
Spice Haute Party is the annual Fashion networking event where the celebrities, fashionistas and socialites meet and engage.
