= Soundcity TV =

TV channel in Nigeria

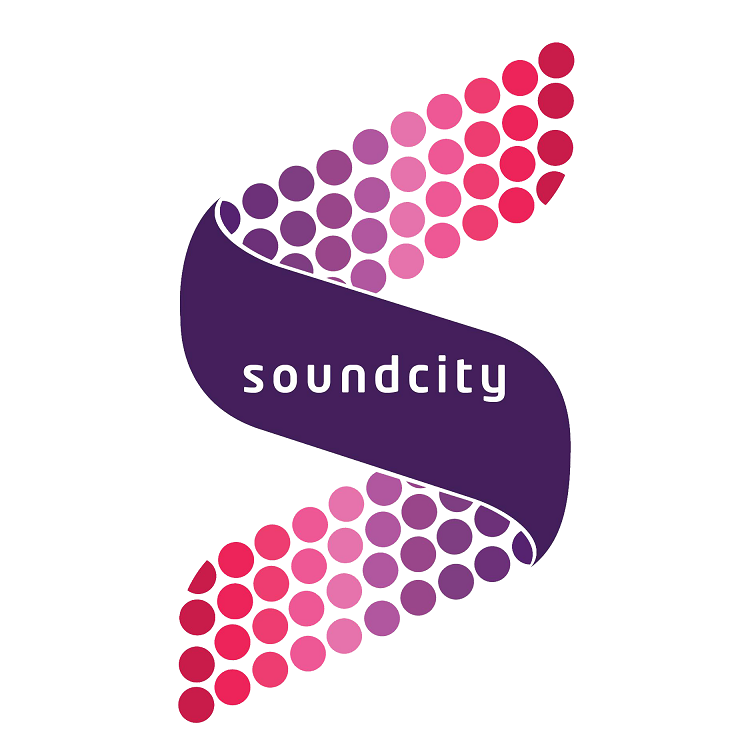

Programming
- Picture format: 16:9, 576i (SDTV) 16:9, 1080i (HDTV)

Ownership
- Owner: Consolidated Media Associates

History
- Launched: March 2009 (Africa)

Links
- Website: www.soundcity.tv

Soundcity TV is a 24-hour Nigerian lifestyle and music channel based in Lagos from Consolidated Media Associates Limited. Soundcity TV describes itself as a "pan-African urban music TV channel."

Soundcity TV is a popular TV station and showcases music videos, live performances, news and interviews with popular acts in addition to organizing, supporting and airing regional and international concerts. Latest music videos from the United States, England, and the rest of the world cutting across all genres are aired on the channel. Sister brands include Soundcity Music Video Awards, Soundcity Urban Blast Festival, Buddie, Soundcity Radio Network, and Soundcity Digital. SoundcityTV began as a 30-minute-long syndicated TV show before it was launched on DStv in 2009 with recognizable Nigerian musical acts like 2face, Idibia and D’banj receiving much airplay as far east as Kenya and Congo, and as far south as Zimbabwe and South Africa which in turn have their musical acts like Fally Ipupa and Freshly Ground popularized in Nigeria. Soundcity plays a powerful part in this cultural exchange.

== Availability ==
Soundcity is available in African countries with DSTV/GOTV footprints. Soundcity Launched in Southern Africa after over ten years on MultiChoice's DStv on 1 December 2016 with a rebranded logo, feel and new shows like 'Top 10 Ghana', 'Top 10 South Africa', 'Top 10 Kenya' and 'Top 10 USA' with new curated playlist like 'Too Much Sauce', 'Video Unlimited' and 'Addiction'.

== Shows ==
- Top Ten Nigeria
- Top Ten USA
- Top Ten Kenya
- Top Ten UK
- Top Ten South Africa
- Top Ten Ghana

== Soundcity Music Video Awards ==
The Soundcity Music Video Awards celebrated the best music videos by African artists in various categories headlined by an international recording artist. SMVA featured American hip hop rapper Nas, South African band Freshlyground, Tic Tac from Ghana, Wyre from Kenya, South African Hiphop group Jozi, Nigeria's Seun Kuti and American hip hop act Mims. The last edition held in 2010.

== Soundcity Urban Blast Festival ==
The Blast concert birthed as Soundcity MTN Campus Blast in 2007 where star Nigerian artists including 2face, 9ice and P Square were taken around campuses to perform to thousands of undergraduates. In 2014, the rested - campus blast became Soundcity Urban Blast Festival, a live Television concert with performances from over thirty (30) Nigerian, South African and other African artistes.

== Soundcity Radio Network ==
In 2016, Soundcity Radio Network launched in the cities of Lagos, Abuja, Kano, Port Harcourt, Enugu and Calabar with streaming on audio and video stream on the official website.

== Soundcity MVP Awards Festival ==
The Soundcity MVP Awards Festival is an annual event presented by Soundcity TV that honours outstanding achievements in African music and entertainment. Launched in December 2016, the inaugural ceremony took place at the Expo Centre, Eko Hotel and Suites in Lagos, Nigeria, and was hosted by comedian Basketmouth. The event featured performances and nominations from top African artists, including Wizkid, Davido, Emtee, Nasty C, Mafikizolo, Mz Vee, Sarkodie, Diamond Platnumz, and Vanessa Mdee. The ceremony was broadcast live across Africa via cable TV, the Soundcity Mobile App, Facebook, and YouTube.

=== 2023 Edition Highlights ===
The fifth edition of the Soundcity MVP Awards Festival was held on 11 February 2023, at the Eko Convention Centre in Lagos, Nigeria. Sponsored by Tingo Mobile, the event celebrated the achievements of African artists across various categories.

- African Artist of the Year: Burna Boy
- Best Male MVP: Asake
- Best Female MVP: Tems
- Best New Artist: Ruger
- Song of the Year: "Buga" by Kizz Daniel & Tekno
- Best Hip-Hop: Black Sherif – "Kwaku The Traveller"
- Video of the Year: Fireboy DML & Asake – "Bandana" (Directed by TG Omori)
- Digital Artist of the Year: Rema
- Legend Award: Akon

The ceremony also paid tribute to the late South African rapper AKA, who had died on the morning of the awards.

=== Broadcast and Accessibility ===
The Soundcity MVP Awards Festival is broadcast live on Soundcity TV via DSTV and GOTV, as well as on the Soundcity Radio Network. The event is also streamed online through the Soundcity Mobile App, YouTube, and other social media platforms.
