= List of awards and nominations received by Simi =

Simi awards and nominations
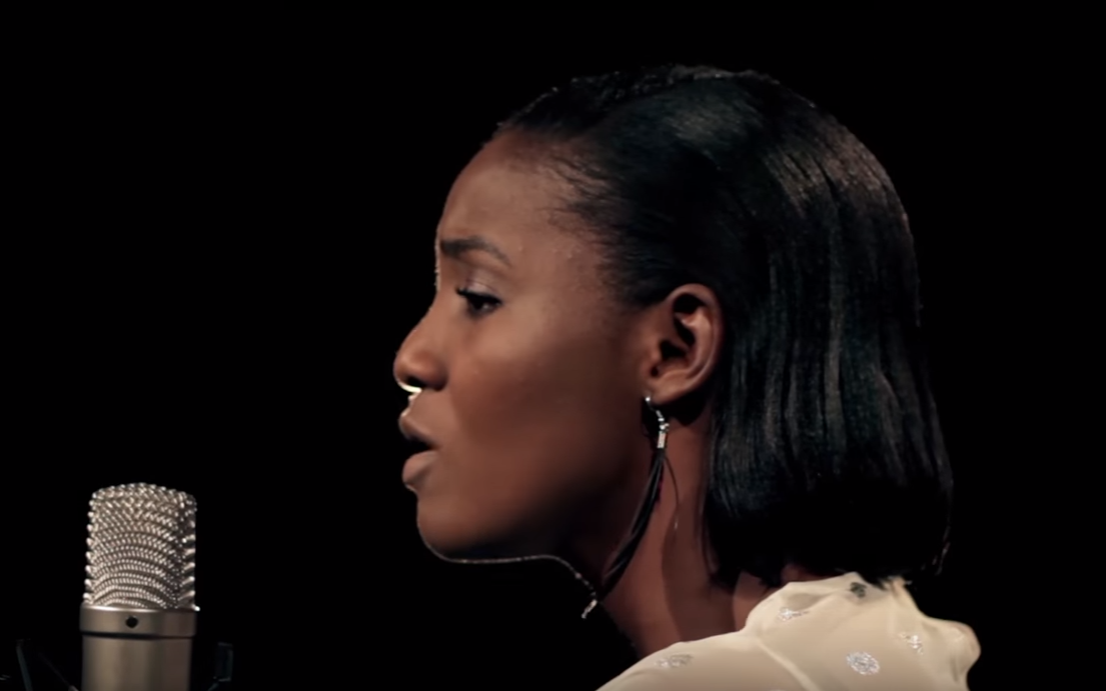
Awards and nominations
Award	Wins	Nominations
The Headies	7	18
Nigeria Entertainment Awards	1	3
City People Entertainment Awards	3	3
Nigeria Music Video Awards	0	3
MTV Africa Music Awards	0	1
Nigerian Teen Choice Awards	1	1
NET Honours	1	1

Totals (Note: Certain award groups do not simply award one winner. They acknowledge several different recipients, have runners-up, and have third place. Since this is a specific recognition and is different from losing an award, runner-up mentions are considered wins in this award tally. For simplification and to avoid errors, each award in this list has been presumed to have had a prior nomination.)
- Wins: 13
- Nominations: 30

This is a list of major music awards and nominations received by Nigerian singer Simi.

Year	Award ceremony	Prize	Recipient/Nominated Work	Result	Ref
2015	2015 Nigeria Entertainment Awards	Most Promising Act to Watch	Herself	Won	
2015	2015 City People Entertainment Awards	Most Promising Act of The Year	Herself	Won	
2015	2015 Nigerian Music Video Awards	Best RnB Video	"Tiff"	Nominated	
2015	2015 Nigerian Music Video Awards	Music Video of The Year	"Tiff"	Nominated	
2015	2015 Nigerian Music Video Awards	Best Soft Rock/Alternative Video	"Jamb Question"	Nominated	
2016	The Headies 2015	Best Alternative Song	"Tiff"	Nominated	
2016	The Headies 2015	Best Vocal Performance (Female)	Herself	Nominated	
2016	2016 City People Entertainment Awards	Female Artiste of the Year	Herself	Won	
2016	Nigerian Teen Choice Awards 2016	Choice Upcoming Female Artist	Herself	Won	
2016	2016 MTV African Music Awards	Best Breakthrough Act	Herself	Nominated	
2016	The Headies 2016	Best Recording of the Year	"Love Don't Care"	Nominated	
2016	The Headies 2016	Best R&B Single	"Love Don't Care"	Nominated	
2016	The Headies 2016	Best Collaboration	"Soldier" (with Falz)	Won	
2016	The Headies 2016	Best Vocal Performance (Female)	"Love Don't Care"	Won	
2017	2017 City People Entertainment Awards	Best Collabo of the Year	"No Forget" (with Adekunle Gold)	Won	
2017	2017 Nigeria Entertainment Awards	Best Afropop Female Artist	Herself	Nominated	
2017	2017 Nigeria Entertainment Awards	Best Album	Chemistry (with Falz)	Nominated	
2017	AFRIMA Awards	Songwriter of the Year	Herself	Won	
2017	Soundcity MVP Awards Festival	Song of the Year	Herself	Nominated	
2017	Soundcity MVP Awards Festival	Best Female MVP	Herself	Nominated	
2017	Soundcity MVP Awards Festival	Best Pop	Herself	Nominated	
2018	The Headies	Best Recording of the Year	"Joromi"	Won	
2018	The Headies	Best R&B/Pop album	Simisola	Nominated	
2018	The Headies	Best R&B single	"Smile For Me"	Won	
2018	The Headies	Best Vocal Performance (female)	"Gone For Good"	Nominated	
2018	The Headies	Album of the Year	Simisola	Won	
2018	The Headies	Artiste of the Year	Herself	Nominated	
2018	Future Awards Africa	Prize for Music	Herself	Won	
2021	Net Honours	Most Popular Musician	Herself	Won	
2021	Net Honours	Most Searched Musician (female)	Herself	Won	
2021	Net Honours	Most Played Pop Song	"Duduke"	Nominated	
2021	Net Honours	Most Played Hip Hop song	"Know you" (Ladipoe featuring Simi]]	Nominated	
2021	Net Honours	Most Played RnB Song	"Running to You" (Chike featuring Simi)	Nominated	
2023	The Headies	Songwriter of the Year	“Loyal”	Nominated	
2023	The Headies	Best R&B Single	“Loyal” – Simi ft Fave	Nominated	
2023	The Headies	Best Vocal Performance (Female)	“Loyal”	Nominated	
2023	The Headies	Best R&B Album	To Be Honest (Tbh)	Nominated	
2023	The Headies	Best Female Artiste	Herself	Nominated	
