= Party No Dey Stop =

Single by Adekunle Gold featuring Zinoleesky

from the album Tequila Ever After
- Released: 15 March 2023
- Studio: Los Angeles
- Genre: Afropop
- Length: 2:48
- Label: Def Jam
- Songwriters: Adekunle Kosoko; Azeez Oniyide; Dayo Olatunji; Udoma Peter Kelvin Amba; Ross James O'Donoghue; Seyifunmi Michael
- Producers: Kel-P; Monro (co.)

Adekunle Gold singles chronology
"5 Star" (2022)	"Party No Dey Stop" (2023)	"Do You Mind?" (2023)

Zinoleesky singles chronology
"Cityboiz" (2023)	"Party No Dey Stop" (2023)	"Gold Digger" (2023)

Music video
- "Party No Dey Stop" on YouTube

"Party No Dey Stop" is a song by Nigerian singer Adekunle Gold featuring Zinoleesky. The song was released on 15 March 2023 as the lead single from the former's fifth studio album Tequila Ever After (2023). The song features additional vocals from Dyo and was ranked #13 on Rolling Stone's list of "The 40 Best Afropop Songs of 2023."

== Background and composition ==
Adekunle Gold admitted to OkayAfrica that the song was already finished before Zinoleesky was involved. He said he finished the song in Los Angeles and producer Sess suggested to feature Zinoleesky on the song. The two met in the studio, where Zinoleesky recorded his verse, and they worked together on refining the song's structure. "Party No Dey Stop" is an afropop track about overcoming challenges in the music industry. Its upbeat sound reflects the energy of Agege, where both artists grew up. The song celebrates their success and encourages listeners to join them in celebrating their achievements.

== Music video ==
The music video for "Party No Dey Stop", directed by Director K, was filmed in Agege and features Adekunle Gold and Zinoleesky celebrating their African heritage through traditional clothing, jewelry and multicolored textiles.

== Commercial performance ==
"Party No Dey Stop" made its debut at No. 1 on the TurnTable Nigeria Top 100, making it the first No. 1 single for both Adekunle Gold and Zinoleesky. In its opening week, the track garnered 4.56 million on-demand streams and achieved 70.4 million in radio airplay. It also set a record for the highest total activity by any single in a week in 2023, surpassing the previous record held by Bnxn's "Gwagwalada" featuring Seyi Vibez and Kizz Daniel. During its second week, the song stayed at No. 1 on streaming platforms, accumulating 3.12 million streams and reaching 75.2 million in radio airplay.

== Charts ==
=== Weekly charts ===
Chart performance for "Party No Dey Stop"
Chart (2023)	Peak position
Nigeria (TurnTable Top 100)	1
Mainstream R&B/Hip-Hop Airplay (Billboard)	40

=== Year-end charts ===
2023 year-end chart performance for "Party No Dey Stop"
Chart (2023)	Position
Nigeria (TurnTable Top 100)	9

== Certifications ==
Certifications for "Party No Dey Stop"
Region	Certification	Certified units/sales
Nigeria (TCSN)	2× Platinum	200,000^{‡}
^{‡} Sales+streaming figures based on certification alone.

== Personnel ==
Credits adapted from Apple Music.

- Adekunle "Adekunle Gold" Kosoko – vocals, songwriting
- Azeez "Zinoleesky" Oniyide – vocals, songwriting
- Dayo "Dyo" Olatunji - additional vocals, songwriting
- Udoma "Kel-P" Amba - production, songwriting
- Ross "Monro" O'Donoghue - production, songwriting
- Seyifunmi Michael - songwriting
- Liz Robson - recording
- Zeus Ewarami-Yesin - recording
- Jesse Ray Ernster - mixing
- Gerhard Westphalen - mastering

== Release history ==
Release history and formats for "Party No Dey Stop"
Region	Date	Format	Label
Various	15 March 2023	Streaming; digital download	Def Jam
