= Fuji (album) =

Studio album by Adekunle Gold
- Released: 3 October 2025
- Genres: Afrobeats; apala; tungba; fuji; R&B; amapiano
- Length: 40:13
- Labels: Somtin Different; Believe Recordings
- Producers: Seyifunmi; Niphkeys; TMXO; Ragee; Monro; The Kazez; Tiwany

Adekunle Gold chronology
Tequila Ever After (2023)	Fuji (2025)

Deluxe edition cover
- Fuji Xtra cover

Singles from Fuji
- 1. "Obimo" Released: 12 February 2025; 2. "Coco Money" Released: 18 July 2025; 3. "Bobo" Released: 5 September 2025

Fuji (a backronym for Finding Uncharted Journeys Inside) is the sixth studio album by Nigerian singer Adekunle Gold, released on 3 October 2025 by his independent label, Somtin Different and Believe Recordings. The album features guest appearances from Davido, Lojay, 6lack, Cruel Santino, Robert Glasper, Mavo, Shoday, the 79th Element, Tkay Maidza, and the Soweto Gospel Choir. Production was handled by Seyifunmi, Niphkeys, TMXO, Ragee, Monro, the Kazez, and Tiwany. Fuji serves as a follow-up to Tequila Ever After (2023).

== Background and recording ==
Adekunle Gold announced the album's release date on 9 September 2025. He said Fuji was created as a deliberate return to the sound that influenced both his music and his upbringing. Speaking to Apple Music, Gold explained that the album title originated as an acronym for Finding Uncharted Journeys Inside, but also reflected his long-standing connection to fújì music, noting that he had incorporated fújì influences across his discography. He described the genre as deeply personal and cultural, calling it "the sound of Lagos" and attributing his early exposure to fújì music played frequently during his childhood. He added that the album was intended to be experienced as a complete body of work, encouraging listeners to engage with it sequentially rather than as individual tracks. Before the album's release, Adekunle Gold chose not to disclose the album's featured artists. In an interview with Cool FM, he said the decision was intentional and meant to shift attention away from guest appearances and toward the music itself, stating that "the only thing that mattered was music, the song, not the optics of it, not who's on it." He added that keeping the features hidden was intended to encourage listeners to experience the album from start to finish without distractions.

Adekunle Gold described Fuji as a reflection of his growth and life experiences. He wrote on Instagram that "every lesson, every city, every version of me led to Fuji. I poured everything I've learned about love, faith, and freedom into it." Gold said in an interview with The Native that the album's opener, "Big Fish", was recorded four times with different producers to achieve the sound he wanted. He explained, "I was heavily involved in production. I reached out to TMXO, told him exactly what I wanted. It took a while, but we got it." Adekunle Gold explained that the inspiration for "Only God Can Save Me" featuring Davido, came during a morning walk. He said he reached out to Davido because of their close friendship and shared love of music, and the two wrote Davido's verse together in a studio session in Atlanta.

== Singles ==
The album's first single "Obimo" was released on 12 February 2025, two days before Valentine's Day, and was included as a bonus track off Fuji. The song's title means "my heart" in Igbo, and it blends Afrobeats, amapiano, and R&B, with lyrics centered on love beyond romance. "Obimo" peaked at #27 on the Billboard U.S. Afrobeats Songs chart during the week of 15 March 2025. "Coco Money" was released as the album's lead (second overall) single off Fuji on 18 July 2025. The Niphkeys-produced single interpolating Rihanna's "Bitch Better Have My Money" is a mix of afropop, afrobeats, and highlife. Lyrically, it explores themes of wealth, luxury, and confidence. According to TurnTable, the song took nearly a year to clear the interpolations, with Rihanna, Travis Scott, and Kanye West being involving in the clearing process and receiving writing credits.

The third single "Bobo", featuring Lojay and Shoday, was jointly released on 5 September 2025 with the album's announcement. Produced by Niphkeys and Seyifunmi, it blends Yoruba and English lyrics with talking drum rhythms and contemporary production. It was previously believed to be the only track with features until they were officially revealed on 3 October 2025. "Believe" was released as a promotional single from Fuji on 30 September 2025. The song opens with a sample of "Just the Two of Us" by Grover Washington Jr. featuring Bill Withers. Lyrically, Adekunle Gold expresses devotion to a love interest, presenting themes of commitment and emotional vulnerability. Adekunle Gold released the music video for "Don Corleone", the album's second track, on 24 October 2025. The video was shot at the King Kosoko Palace in Ereko, Lagos Island, and featured appearances by HRH Abiola Kosoko. It also included scenes from the Fuji Street Carnival, with cameo appearances from Rybeena, Kid Carder, TML Vibez, Zlatan, Saheed Osupa, Taye Currency, Atawewe, and Obesere. The music video for the album's fourth track, "Many People", was released on 11 November 2025. The song originally featured Yinka Ayefele (also making a cameo), whose track "Mi O Mo J'orin Lo" was sampled, while the music video included an additional verse from Adewale Ayuba. The video was directed by Perliks.

== Composition ==
Fuji is a pop-leaning album that blends afropop with elements of tungba, R&B, amapiano, house, and fújì, a Yoruba genre built on layered percussion, talking drums, and call-and-response vocals, which he described as central to his sound. Critics said that the album references fújì mainly through cadence, vocal delivery, and rhythm, rather than strict traditional arrangements. The album opens with "Big Fish", which begins with a sakara sample attributed to Lefty Salami Balogun before moving into a bass-driven afropop beat.

"Don Corleone" and "Bobo" lean on talking drums and rhythmic chants associated with fújì, while "Coco Money" uses a gbedu-styled production and interpolates Rihanna's "Bitch Better Have My Money". Love and family themes appear on "Believe" and "Love is an Action", which samples "Just the Two of Us" and "What You Won't Do for Love", and on "My Love is the Same", a song addressed to his daughter. "Many People", featuring Yinka Ayefele, borrows from Ayefele's "Mi O Mo J'orin Lo" and shows the album's clearest link to Yoruba indigenous music. "Only God Can Save Me" and "Attack" draw from amapiano and house, while "Simile" and "I'm Not Done" close the album with reflective themes of faith and endurance.

== Critical reception ==
Professional ratings
Review scores
Source	Rating
Pulse Nigeria	8.6/10
Premium Times	8/10
Afrocritik	7.8/10
Zikoko!	6.5/10

Fuji received generally positive reviews from music critics. Adeayo Adebiyi of Pulse Nigeria rated it an 8.6 out of 10, praising Adekunle Gold for not attempting to "recreate or replace Fuji music," but instead choosing to "expand on the genre’s cultural richness with the contemporary flair needed to bring it long-overdue mainstream attention." He concluded that "Fuji is an accomplished part of a broader Fuji sound, and it should be appreciated as such."

Writing for Afrocritik, Abioye Damilare Samson described the album as one that presented Adekunle Gold as "an artiste fully aware of his evolution." While he commended its pop-forward blend of Fuji textures and Afropop confidence, he felt that it "borrowed Fuji's percussive textures, but stop[ped] short of full immersion," and rated the album 7.8 out of 10. Abdulmuqsit Idowu of Deeds Magazine stated that Fuji saw Adekunle Gold making "a daring leap into the heart of one of Nigeria’s most iconic genres," praising its cohesive fusion of tradition and modern sound, and concluding that it was "an expansion of what the genre can be in the 21st century." Omotoyosi Idowu of Premium Times characterised Fuji as "both a homecoming and a celebration of growth," highlighting its blend of Fuji, sakara, and Afrobeats, and concluding that it "proudly describes the singer's life, growth, and success," awarding the album an 8 out of 10 rating. Chinonso Ihekire of Guardian Life praised the album's "sheer audacity," drawing attention to its sequencing, vocal delivery, and cultural references, and described it as "urban dance pop, with rich Fuji tonal influences" that updated the genre for a modern sound rather than presenting a traditional Fuji record.

=== Accolades ===
Year	Awards ceremony	Award description(s)	Results	Ref
2026	The Headies	Afrobeats Album of the Year	Pending	

== Track listing ==
Fuji track listing
No.	Title	Writer(s)	Producer(s)	Length
1.	"Big Fish"	Adekunle Kosoko; Peter Amba; Ifeanyichukwu Bosah	Adekunle Gold; TMXO	2:24
2.	"Don Corleone"	Kosoko	Gold; Seyifunmi	2:26
3.	"Bobo" (featuring Lojay and Shoday)	Kosoko; Lekan Osifeso Jr.; Shodade Segun; Bosah	Niphkeys; Seyifunmi	3:02
4.	"Coco Money"	Kosoko; Ibrahim Bakare; Badriia Bourelly; Ebony Oshunrinde; Jamil Pierre; Robyn Fenty; Jacques Webster II; Kanye West	Niphkeys; Seyifunmi	2:16
5.	"Believe"	Kosoko; Timi Aladeloba; Bakare; Tobechukwu Okorie; William Salter; Ralph MacDonald; Bill Withers	Seyifunmi; Monro	2:48
6.	"My Love is the Same"	Kosoko; Alexandra Govere; Nathan Otekalu	Seyifunmi; Bantu; Dr. Chaii	3:11
7.	"Love Is An Action" (featuring 6lack)	Kosoko; Ricardo Valentine; Bobby Caldwell	TMXO	2:33
8.	"Many People"	Kosoko; Olayinka Ayefele	Seyifunmi; The Kazez	2:41
9.	"Attack" (featuring Cruel Santino, Mavo, and Tkay Maidza)	Kosoko; Osayaba Ize-Iyamu; Marvin Oseremen; Takudza Maidza; Iyioluwa Owabumowa	TMXO; Tiwany	2:52
10.	"Only God Can Save Me" (featuring Davido)	Kosoko; David Adeleke; Bakare; Bosah	Seyifunmi	2:43
11.	"Lailo"	Kosoko	The Kazez	2:33
12.	"Oba"	Kosoko; Bosah; Bukola Elemide	Adekunle Gold; TMXO	3:07
13.	"Simile" (featuring Soweto Gospel Choir and the 79th Element)	Kosoko	Seyifunmi	2:29
14.	"I'm Not Done" (featuring Robert Glasper)	Kosoko; Govere; Elizabeth Sobowale	Robert Glasper; Seyifunmi; Bantu; Dr. Chaii; Shungudzo	2:25
15.	"Obimo" (bonus track)	Kosoko; Simisola Ogunleye; Bakare; Alexander Osamudiame	Ragee	2:35
Total length:				40:13

Fuji Xtra bonus tracks
No.	Title	Writer(s)	Producer(s)	Length
16.	"Life of the Faaji"	Kosoko; Omoniyi Raphael; Elvis Akujobi	TMXO; Godomarr	2:29
17.	"Shake Shake" (featuring TML Vibez)	Kosoko; Timileyin Sulaimon	TMXO; Godomarr	2:30
18.	"Formation" (featuring Olamide)	Kosoko; Olamide Adedeji; Dairo Ishola	Chillz	2:36
19.	"Blue Fire" (featuring Simi)	Kosoko; Ogunleye; Bosah; Otekalu	Seyifunmi; Kel-P; KDaGreat	3:10
20.	"I Got Wiser On My Own"	Kosoko; Ari PenSmith; Devon Chisolm; Olufunmibi Awoshiley	TMXO; Kel-P; KDaGreat	2:47
Total length:				53:47

Notes

- "Big Fish" samples "Agunbiade Baba Osha Medley" by Lefty Salami.
- "Don Corleone" contains background vocals by Simi.
- "Coco Money" interpolates "Bitch Better Have My Money" by Rihanna.
- "Believe" samples "Just the Two of Us" by Grover Washington Jr. featuring Bill Withers.
- "My Love is the Same" includes vocal interludes from Adekunle Gold's daughter, Adejare.
- "Love Is An Action" interpolates "What You Won't Do for Love" by Bobby Caldwell.
- "Many People" samples "Mi O Mo J'Orin Lo" by Yinka Ayefele.
- "Lailo" interpolates "Awa Tunde Batinde" by K1 De Ultimate.
- "Oba" samples "Iba" by Aṣa.

== Personnel ==
- Adekunle "Gold" Kosoko – vocals, songwriting, production (1, 2, 12), engineering (1–3, 5–20)
- Lekan "Lojay" Onifeso Jr. – vocals (3), songwriting (3)
- Shodade "Shoday" Segun – vocals (3), songwriting (3)
- Ricardo "6lack" Valentine – vocals (7), songwriting (7)
- Yinka Ayefele – vocals (8), songwriting (8)
- Osayaba "Cruel Santino" Ize-Iyamu – vocals (9), songwriting (9)
- Takudza "Tkay" Maidza – vocals (9), songwriting (9)
- Marvin "Mavo" Oseremen – vocals (9), songwriting (9)
- David "Davido" Adeleke – vocals (10), songwriting (10)
- Robert Glasper – vocals (14), production (14)
- Timileyin "TML Vibez" Sulaimon – vocals (17), songwriting (17)
- Olamide Adedeji – vocals (18), songwriting (18)
- Simisola "Simi" Ogunleye – vocals (19), mixing (4, 15–20), songwriting (15)
- Peter "Kel-P" Amba – songwriting (1), production (19, 20)
- Ifeanyichukwu Bosah – songwriting (1, 3, 10, 12, 19)
- Ibrahim Bakare – songwriting (4, 5, 10, 15)
- Badriia "Bibi" Bourelly – songwriting (4)
- Ebony Oshunrinde – songwriting (4)
- Jamil Pierre – songwriting (4)
- Robyn Fenty – songwriting (4)
- Jacques "Travis Scott" Webster II – songwriting (4)
- Kanye West – songwriting (4)
- Bukola "Aṣa" Elemide – songwriting (12)
- Omoniyi "Zlatan" Raphael – songwriting (16)
- Elvis "Zichy" Akujobi – songwriting (16)
- Ari PenSmith – songwriting (20)
- Devon Chisolm – songwriting (20)
- Olufunmibi Awoshiley – songwriting (20)
- TMXO – production (1, 6, 9, 12, 16, 17, 20), songwriting (5), drums (5)
- Tiwany – production (9)
- Tobechukwu "Peruzzi" Okoh – songwriting (5)
- William Salter – songwriting (5)
- Ralph MacDonald – songwriting (5)
- Bill Withers – songwriting (5)
- Omofuma Oseghale Richard – guitar (6)
- Nathan Otekalu – songwriting (6, 19)
- Alexandra Govere – songwriting (6)
- Bobby Caldwell – songwriting (7)
- Iyioluwa Owabumowa – songwriting (9)
- Elizabeth Sobowale – songwriting (14)
- Alexander Osamudiame – songwriting (15)
- Dairo "EasyScope" Ishola – songwriting (18)
- Promise Oninuola – guitar (10, 16–18)
- Soweto Gospel Choir – choir (13)
- 79th Element – vocals (13)
- Steve W. Mauldin – conductor (13)
- Patrick Monnius – viola (13)
- Paul Nelson – cello (13)
- David Davidson – violin (13)
- Karen Winkelmann – violin (13)
- Seyifunmi Bakare – production (2–6, 8, 10, 13, 14, 19), strings (11)
- Niphkeys – production (3, 4)
- Monro – production (5)
- Bantu – production (6, 14)
- Dr. Chaii – production (6, 14)
- The Kazez – production (8, 11)
- Shungudzo – production (14), songwriting (14)
- Ragee – production (15)
- Godomarr – production (16, 17)
- Chillz – production (18)
- KDaGreat – production (19, 20)
- Victor "Vtek" Kpoudosu – mixing, mastering (1–3, 5–14, 16–20)
- Harry Chaplin – mixing (16–20)
- Babatunde Alaba – percussion (2, 18), drums (15)
- Ireplays – percussion (4)
- Irockclassic – vocal recording engineering (3), engineering (16, 18–20)
- Kiernan Beardmore – mixing (4, 15)
- Mazen Murad – mastering (4, 15)

== Charts ==
=== Weekly charts ===
Weekly chart performance for Fuji
Chart (2025)	Peak position
Nigerian Albums (TurnTable)	5

== Release history ==
Release history and formats for Fuji
Region	Date	Format	Label
Various	3 October 2025	Streaming; digital download	Somtin Different; Believe Recorings
United States	23 January 2026	LP	Believe Recordings
United States	30 January 2026	Vinyl	Believe Recordings
