= Tequila Ever After =

Studio album by Adekunle Gold
- Released: 28 July 2023
- Recorded: 2023
- Genre: Afrobeats; highlife; amapiano; Afro-pop
- Length: 50:23
- Label: Def Jam
- Producer: Tony Duardo; Kel-P; Monro; Seyifunmi; Jonah Christian; Mannywellz; Blaisebeatz; Bizness Boi; Fridayy; Michaël Brun; Shae Jacobs; Phil The Keys; Harv; Labrinth

Adekunle Gold chronology
Catch Me If You Can (2022)	Tequila Ever After (2023)	Fuji (2025)

Singles from Tequila Ever After
- 1. "Party No Dey Stop" Released: 15 March 2023; 2. "Do You Mind?" Released: 25 May 2023; 3. "Omo Eko" Released: 25 May 2023; 4. "Ogaranya" Released: 14 July 2023; 5. "Look What You Made Me Do" Released: 17 January 2024

Tequila Ever After is the fifth studio album by Nigerian singer Adekunle Gold. It was released on 28 July 2023 through Def Jam Recordings. It features guest appearances from Pharrell Williams, Simi, Zinoleesky, Odumodublvck, Khalid, Coco Jones, Nile Rodgers, Habib Koité and Ami Faku. The album featured production from mainly Kel-P and Blaisebeatz, with additional production on songs from Pharrell Williams, Labrinth, Seyifunmi, Tony Duardo, The Elements, Monro, Jonah Christian, Bizness Boi, Mannywell, Fridayy, Shae Jacobs, Phil The Keys, Harv, Michaël Brun and Labrinth. Tequila Ever After serves as a follow-up to Catch Me If You Can (2022).

== Background ==
In an interview with NME, Adekunle Gold described Tequila Ever After as the next phase of his musical journey, which he refers to as "level five." He revealed that he challenged himself to write 50 songs for the album, ultimately narrowing it down to 18 or 19 tracks. Gold emphasized that he pushed himself lyrically more than ever before, saying, "I need people to know that I pushed myself the hardest on this one." The album blends Afrobeats, highlife, and contemporary pop, with tracks like "Tio Tequila" and "Omo Eko" showcasing both sensual and celebratory elements. Gold's signing with Def Jam, under the guidance of his longtime friend Tunji Balogun, further propelled his creative ambitions, allowing him to explore new musical territories while remaining connected to his Nigerian roots.

In a separate interview with OkayAfrica, Adekunle Gold revealed that the album title "Tequila Ever After" was inspired by his first time drinking tequila, which marked the beginning of a period filled with joy and good energy. He also discussed his collaboration with producer Kel-P, noting that their relationship has grown beyond just music, referring to Kel-P as "family" and someone who has been instrumental in shaping the sound of the album.

== Singles ==
The album's lead single "Party No Dey Stop" features Zinoleesky, and was produced by Kel-P. The song was released on 15 March 2023 with an accompanying visualizer. On 25 May 2023, Adekunle Gold released a three-track digital EP titled Tio Tequila, which included the second and third singles "Do You Mind" and "Omo Eko" alongside "Party No Dey Stop". Both songs were produced by Kel-P. "'Tio Tequila' is a metaphor for where I'm at in life right now," Adekunle Gold said in an interview with The Fader. "I'm happy and I just want to celebrate my wins and we should all feel the same. The three songs are a taster for what's to come on my next album; they're uplifting and will get you in the mood to party." "Ogaranya" was also produced by Kel-P, and arrived with a Director K-directed music video on 14 July 2023. The fifth single, "Look What You Made Me Do" features Adekunle Gold's wife Simi, and was released to coincide with the two's fifth wedding anniversary on 17 January 2024 with a Director K-directed music video. The single spawned an acoustic version of the song on 20 January 2024.

== Critical reception ==
Adeayo Adebiyi of Pulse Nigeria praised Tequila Ever After for its joyful tone, reflecting Adekunle Gold's state of mind at his career peak. The album balances artistic depth and commercial appeal, blending Afrobeats, highlife, and pop. Adebiyi highlights Adekunle's intentionality, calling the album a "celebration of success" through its diverse sound and well-chosen collaborations. Adebiyi rated it 8.9 out of 10, noting its "impressive shapeshifting" across genres and a coherent theme of happiness and personal growth.

Uzoma Iherijika of The Native praised Adekunle Gold's Tequila Ever After for showcasing his continued evolution and creativity. He notes, "Adekunle Gold is establishing the mastery of his own lane, his style and his legacy" with this album, highlighting its lighthearted, conversational nature inspired by the artist's newfound love for tequila. Iherijika concludes that the album is "Adekunle Gold's finest moment yet," giving it a rating of 6.8/10.

Hope Ibiale of Afrocritik's review of Adekunle Gold's Tequila Ever After highlights the album as a celebration of Gold's artistic growth and a reflection of his current state of mind. Ibiale praises the project for its cohesive celebratory theme and the effective use of diverse musical genres, stating, "The whole musicality of the Tequila Ever After positions Gold at a new height in his artistry." The album is described as a toast to Gold's growth and happiness, with a rating of 7.8/10.

Esther Kalu's review, writing for Premium Times of Tequila Ever After praises Adekunle Gold's versatility and evolution from a folksy artist to a pop star, showcasing his growth through 18 tracks. Kalu describes the album as "unadulterated musical beauty" and emphasizes Gold's adaptability and artistry, highlighting tracks like "Ogaranya" and "Look What You Made Me Do." She gives the album a rating of 8/10, recognizing Gold's transition and creative genius over the years.

== Track listing ==
Tequila Ever After track listing
No.	Title	Writer(s)	Producer(s)	Length
1.	"Chasing Peace Of Mind" (featuring Ami Faku and Habib Koité)	Adekunle Kosoko; Ami Faku; Tony Duardo	Tony Duardo	3:27
2.	"Party No Dey Stop" (featuring Zinoleesky)	Kosoko; Azeez Oniyide; Oladayo Olatunji; Ross James O'Donoghue; Michael Bakare; Udoma Amba	Kel-P; Monro	2:48
3.	"Soro"	Kosoko; Bakare; Amba	Kel-P; Seyifunmi^{[b]}	2:42
4.	"Tio Baby"	Kosoko; Bakare; Ari PenSmith; Taylor Smith; Jonah Christian; Tunji Balogun; Emmanuel Ajomale	Christian; Seyifunmi^{[a]}; Mannywellz^{[a]}	2:19
5.	"Ogaranya"	Kosoko; Abayomi Ilerioluwa; Ifeanyichukwu Bosah; Marcel Akunwata	Blaisebeatz	2:48
6.	"Wrong Person" (featuring Odumodublvck)	Kosoko; Tochukwu Ojogwu; Amba; Daecolm Holland; Varren Wade	Kel-P	2:43
7.	"Don't Be A Baby"	Kosoko; Amba	Kel-P	2:28
8.	"Do You Mind?"	Kosoko; Olatunji; Amba; Sam Roman	Kel-P	2:27
9.	"Sisi Ganja"	Kosoko; Andre Robertson; PenSmith; Elizabeth Sobowale; Francis LeBlanc; Bakare	Bizness Boi; Fridayy^{[b]}; Seyifunmi^{[a]}	2:23
10.	"Make It Easy" (featuring Coco Jones)	Kosoko; Courtney Jones; Ronald Banful; Amba; Jacquetta Singleton; Ria Sean	Brun; Kel-P^{[a]}	3:19
11.	"Not My Problem"	Kosoko; Godwin Sonzi; Shae Jacobs; Rachel Garton	Jacobs	2:51
12.	"Kere"	Kosoko; Adajare Kosoko; Anmba	Kel-P	2:40
13.	"Look What You Made Me Do" (featuring Simi)	Kosoko; Simisola Ogunleye; Philip Cornish; Bakare	Seyifunmi; Phil The Keys^{[a]}	2:54
14.	"Omo Eko"	Kosoko; Amba	Kel-P	2:33
15.	"Come Back To Me" (featuring Khalid)	Kosoko; Khalid Robinson; Bernard Harvey	Harv	2:45
16.	"Falling Up" (featuring Pharrell Williams and Nile Rodgers)	Kosoko; Pharrell Williams; Nile Rodgers Jr.; Bakare; PenSmith; Oniyide	Williams	3:19
17.	"To My Own"	Kosoko; Olatunji; Bakare; Timothy McKenzie	Labrinth; Seyifunmi^{[a]}	3:06
18.	"All My Life"	Kosoko; Amba; Keven Wolfsohn; Paul Goller	The Elements; Kel-P^{[b]}	2:42
Total length:				50:23

Notes

- ^{^[a]} signifies an additional producer
- ^{^[b]} signifies a co-producer
- "Party No Dey Stop" features additional vocals from Dyo.

== Personnel ==
- Adekunle "Gold" Kosoko – main artist, songwriter, recording engineer
- Simisola "Simi" Ogunleye – featured artist (track 13)
- Khalid Robinson – featured artist (track 15)
- Pharrell Williams – featured artist, songwriter, producer (track 16)
- Nile Rodgers Jr. – featured artist, songwriter (track 16)
- Habib Koité – featured artist (track 1)
- Ami Faku – featured artist (track 1)
- Azeez "Zinoleesky" Oniyide – featured artist (track 2)
- Tochukwu "Odumodublvck" Ojogwu – featured artist (track 6)
- Courtney "Coco" Jones – featured artist (track 10)
- Dayo "Dyo" Adetunji – additional vocals, writer (tracks 2, 8)
- Udoma "Kel-P" Amba – producer, additional vocals, songwriter
- Michael "Seyifunmi" Bakare – arranger, producer, songwriter
- Ronald "GuiltyBeatz" Banful – songwriter (track 10)
- Michaël Brun – songwriter, producer (track 10)
- Andre "Bizness Boi" Robertson – producer, writer (track 9)
- Francis "Fridayy" Leblanc – co-producer (track 9)
- Bernard "Harv" Harvey – producer (track 15)
- Keven Wolfsohn and Paul Bogum "The Elements" – producer (track 18)
- Gerhard Westphalen – mastering engineer
- Jesse Ray Ernster – mixing engineer
- Harry Chaplin – spatial mixing engineer
- Liz Robson – recording engineer
- Kahlil Vellani – recording engineer (track 15)
- Tyree Hawkins – recording engineer (track 16)
- Mike Larson – recording engineer (track 16)

== Release history ==
Release history and formats for Tequila Ever After
Region	Date	Format	Label
Various	28 July 2023	Streaming; digital download	Def Jam
