= Catch Me If You Can (Adekunle Gold album) =

Studio album by Adekunle Gold
- Released: 4 February 2022
- Recorded: 2020–2023
- Genre: Afro pop; R&B; pop
- Length: 41:00
- Label: Afro Urban; Splatoon
- Producer: Seyifunmi; TMXO; Pheelz; Blaisebeatz; Bigfish; Quebeat; Rymez; Lekaa Beats; Tay Iwar; Spax; Kali; Synematik

Adekunle Gold chronology
Afro Pop Vol. 1 (2020)	Catch Me If You Can (2022)	Tequila Ever After (2023)

Singles from Catch Me If You Can
- 1. "It Is What It Is" Released: 30 April 2021; 2. "Sinner" Released: 9 July 2021; 3. "High" Released: 3 September 2021; 4. "Mercy" Released: 21 January 2022; 5. "One Woman" Released: 11 May 2022

Catch Me If You Can is the fourth studio album by Nigerian singer Adekunle Gold. It was released on 4 February 2022 by Afro Urban Records and distributed by Splatoon. The album features guest appearances from Stefflon Don, Davido, Ty Dolla Sign, Fatoumata Diawara, Lucky Daye and Fousheé. Adekunle Gold enlisted production from Pheelz, Blaisebeatz, Seyifunmi, Tay Iwar, Synematik, Bigfish, Kali, Rymez, Lekaa Beats, Quebeat and TMXO.

== Background and recording ==
Adekunle Gold began working on Catch Me If You Can while still recording his last album, Afro Pop Vol. 1 in 2020. Initially planned as a continuation, Afro Pop Vol. 2, he decided to focus on a new project when the songs started to feel like a distinct body of work. “It didn’t feel like a mixtape or volume of anything,” he told Billboard. “It felt like a project of its own that needed exploration.” Much of the album was written in Los Angeles during his U.S. tour. He also collaborated with artists like Ty Dolla Sign, who took the time to learn Yoruba for their track “One Woman.” Gold's use of Yoruba throughout the album reflects his deep connection to his heritage, something he proudly showcases in his music.

== Singles ==
The album's lead single "It Is What It Is" was released on 30 April 2021 and was produced by Kali and Blaisebeatz. The album's second single "Sinner" features Lucky Daye and was released on 9 July 2021. The song was produced by Blaisebeatz. The Pheelz-produced third single "High" features Davido and was released on 3 September 2021. The fourth single "Mercy" was released on 21 January 2022. It was produced by Blaisebeatz and features additional vocals from wife Simi, who also mixed it. The fifth and final single "One Woman" features Ty Dolla Sign. The Blaisebeatz-produced single arrived on 11 May 2022 with a Mike Amofah-directed music video.

== Critical reception ==
Professional ratings
Review scores
Source	Rating
Afrocritik	7/10
The Native	7.6/10
Pulse Nigeria	7.8/10
Pitchfork	6.8/10
The Lagos Review	7.5/10

Dennis Ade Peter from The Native praised Adekunle Gold's Catch Me If You Can as a confident and refined culmination of his previous work. He highlighted the album's mix of early AG's rustic influences with contemporary Nigerian pop. Peter notes, “Throughout this album, AG sings with the sure-footedness of someone that doesn’t have much to prove.” The review reflects the singer's growth and self-assurance, giving it a rating of 7.6/10.

Jessica Kariisa from Pitchfork's review views Catch Me If You Can as an artist conforming to Afropop trends rather than leading them. Despite his clear vocal and songwriting abilities, the album "feels like a completed to-do list of Afropop trends" rather than a cohesive project. While some tracks like “Mase Mi” and “Selah” stand out, the overall album misses an opportunity to bring pop closer to Gold's highlife roots. The rating was a 6.8/10.

Pulse Nigeria's Motolani Alake's review of Adekunle Gold's Catch Me If You Can highlights his transformation into "Bad Boy Deks," emphasizing a more confident and self-assured pop star persona. Alake praises the album's thematic depth, noting that it reveals the "dreamer, the doer, and the achiever," while balancing ego and vulnerability. However, he critiques some tracks for being "slightly too minimalistic either in chorus or by way of production." He ranked it a 7.8/10.

Chinonso Ihekire of Afrocritik's review of Catch Me If You Can describes it as a significant and introspective album that marks a notable evolution in Gold's music career. The review highlights the album's high replay value, impressive collaborations, and intimate nature, noting, "It radiates as Gold’s most intimate, confident and profound body of work, so far." However, it also mentions some issues with content direction and identity crisis. The album is rated 7/10.

The Lagos Review described the album as a continuation of his signature style, blending familiarity with fresh elements. The review notes, "Catch Me If You Can is more of a kinetic testimony, than it is a cynical brag," highlighting that despite the album's unpredictable nature and evolution, it remains true to Gold's themes of affection and optimism. The review suggests that while Gold's music continues to evolve, his core elements and themes remain consistent. The album is rated 7.5/10.

== Track listing ==
Catch Me If You Can track listing
No.	Title	Writer(s)	Producer(s)	Length
1.	"Born Again" (featuring Fatoumata Diawara)	Adekunle Kosoko; Fatoumata Diawara; David Ayodele; Michael Bakare	Seyifunmi; Davayo	1:51
2.	"Win"	Kosoko; Oluwatimilehin Aladeloba; Simisola Ogunleye	TMXO	3:02
3.	"Mase Mi"	Kosoko; Marcel Akunwata; Michael Awele	Blaisebeatz	3:12
4.	"One Woman" (featuring Ty Dolla Sign)	Kosoko; Tyrone Griffin Jr.; Akunwata; Awele	Blaisebeatz	2:40
5.	"Mercy"	Kosoko; Salami Abbas; Ogunleye; Friday Igwe; Akunwata; Awele	Blaisebeatz	2:47
6.	"More Than Enough"	Kosoko; Oladipupo Olugbemi	Quebeat	3:08
7.	"Sinner" (featuring Lucky Daye)	Kosoko; David Brown; Awele; Akunwata	Blaisebeatz	2:54
8.	"FYE" (featuring Stefflon Don)	Kosoko; Stephanie Allen; Abayomi Ilerioluwa	Rymez; Lekaa Beats	3:30
9.	"Sleep"	Kosoko; Austin Iwar	Tay Iwar	2:37
10.	"High" (featuring Davido)	Kosoko; David Adeleke	Pheelz	3:13
11.	"Dior, Dior, Dior" (featuring Fousheé)	Kosoko	Spax	3:16
12.	"It Is What It Is"	Kosoko; Kali	Kali; Blaisebeatz	2:54
13.	"Selah"	Kosoko; Adeniyi Adelekan	Synematik	3:13
14.	"Catch Me If You Can"	Kosoko; Nsikak David	Bigfish	3:19
Total length:				41:00

== Personnel ==
- Adekunle "Gold" Kosoko – vocals, writer
- Stephanie "Stefflon Don" Allen – vocals, writer
- David "Davido" Adeleke - vocals, writer
- Brittany Fousheé - vocals, writer
- David "Lucky Daye" Brown - vocals, writer
- Tyrone "Ty Dolla Sign" Griffin Jr. - vocals, writer
- Fatoumata Diawara - vocals, writer
- Abayomi "Bigfish" Ilerioluwa - producer, writer
- Adeniyi "Synematik" Adelekan - producer, writer
- Austin "Tay" Iwar - producer, writer
- Oluwatimilehin "TMXO" Aladeloba - producer, writer
- Michael "Seyifunmi" Bakare - producer, writer
- David "Davayo" Ayodele - producer, writer
- Rodney "Rymez" Hwingwiri - producer
- Oladipupo "Quebeat" Olugbemi – producer
- Phillip "Pheelz" Moses - producer
- Akano "Spax" Samuel - producer
- Nsikak David - writer

== Release history ==
Release history and formats for Catch Me If You Can
Region	Date	Format	Label
Various	4 February 2022	Streaming; digital download	Afro Urban
