= The Headies Award for Best Alternative Song =

Nigerian music industry award

- Awarded for: A voting category for the artiste whose songs reflect any form or style of music which falls outside the mainstream of recent or past popular musical trends.
- Country: Nigeria
- Presented by: Hip Hop World Magazine
- First award: 2013
- Final award: 2023
- Currently held by: Wizard Chan – "Earth Song" (2023)
- Website: theheadies.com

The Headies Award for Best Alternative Song is an award presented at The Headies, a ceremony that was established in 2006 and originally called the Hip Hop World Awards. It was first presented to Blackmagic in 2013 for his song "Repete".

== Recipients ==
Best Alternative Song
| Year | Nominees | Result | Ref |
|---|---|---|---|
| 2023 | "Earth Song" by Wizard Chan | Won | |
| 2023 | “Final Champion” by Cruel Santino | Nominated | |
| 2023 | “The Traveller” by Basketmouth (featuring The Cavemen) | Nominated | |
| 2023 | "In A Loop" by BOJ (featuring Moliy and Mellissa) | Nominated | |
| 2023 | "Game Changer (Dike)" by Flavour | Nominated | |
| 2023 | "Tinko Tinko (Don't Play Me for a Fool)" by Obongjayar | Nominated | |
| 2022 | "Doings" by Flavour (featuring Phyno) | Won | |
| 2022 | "Free Your Mind" by Made Kuti | Nominated | |
| 2022 | "Gonto" by Ibejii | Nominated | |
| 2022 | "Hustle" by Basketmouth (featuring The Cavemen, Bez, and Dice Ailes) | Nominated | |
| 2022 | "Meji Meji" by Brymo | Nominated | |
| 2022 | "Selense" by The Cavemen | Nominated | |
| 2020 | "I Wonder" by Moelogo (featuring The Cavemen, Bez, and Dice Ailes) | Won | |
| 2020 | "Corner" by Lady Donli (featuring VanJess and The Cavemen) | Nominated | |
| 2020 | "Bitter" by Deena Ade | Nominated | |
| 2020 | "Anita" by The Cavemen | Nominated | |
| 2020 | "Money Devotion" by Gbasky | Nominated | |
| 2020 | "God Save the Queen" by Olu | Nominated | |
| 2019 | "Finding Efe" by Johnny Drille | Won | |
| 2019 | "Cash" by Lady Donli | Nominated | |
| 2019 | "Mr Rebel" by Tems | Nominated | |
| 2019 | "Heya!" by Brymo | Nominated | |
| 2019 | "Ire" by Adekunle Gold | Nominated | |
| 2018 | "Fun Mi Lowo Mi" by Aramide (featuring Sound Sultan and Koker) | Won | |
| 2018 | "Money" by Adekunle Gold | Nominated | |
| 2018 | "Radio" by Nonso Amadi | Nominated | |
| 2018 | "Romeo & Juliet" by Johnny Drille | Nominated | |
| 2018 | "Lagos Barbie" by Bantu | Nominated | |
| 2016 | "You Suppose Know" by Bez | Won | |
| 2016 | "Pick Up" by Adekunle Gold | Nominated | |
| 2016 | "Something Good is Happening" by Brymo | Nominated | |
| 2016 | "Wait for Me" by Johnny Drille | Nominated | |
| 2016 | "Gentleman" by Ric Hassani | Nominated | |
| 2015 | "Sade" by Adekunle Gold | Won | |
| 2015 | "Awww" by Di'Ja | Nominated | |
| 2015 | "There's A Fire" by Bez | Nominated | |
| 2015 | "Satan Be Gone" by Aṣa | Nominated | |
| 2015 | "Rain On Me" by Ugovinna | Nominated | |
| 2015 | "Tiff" by Simi | Nominated | |
| 2014 | "BOTM" by BOJ | Won | |
| 2014 | "Body" by Blackmagic (featuring Banky W.) | Nominated | |
| 2014 | "Good Man" by Ruby Gyang | Nominated | |
| 2014 | "Why You Love Me" by Nosa | Nominated | |
| 2013 | "Repete" by Blackmagic | Won | |
| 2013 | "Omo Pastor" by Ajebutter22 and Studio Magic (featuring BOJ) | Nominated | |
| 2013 | "Feel Alright" by Show Dem Camp (featuring BOJ and Poe) | Nominated | |
| 2013 | "This Year" by Jaywon | Nominated | |

== Category records ==
Most wins

| Rank | 1st | 2nd | 3rd | 4th |
|---|---|---|---|---|
| Artist | Wizard Chan | Flavour; Moelogo | Johnny Drille; Aramide; Bez | Adekunle Gold; BOJ; Blackmagic |
| Total wins | 1 win each | 1 win each | 1 win each | 1 win each |

Most nominations

| Rank | 1st | 2nd | 3rd |
|---|---|---|---|
| Artist | Adekunle Gold | Johnny Drille; Brymo; The Cavemen | Basketmouth; BOJ; Flavour; Lady Donli; Bez; Blackmagic |
| Total noms | 4 nominations | 3 nominations | 2 nominations |
