= Jamb Question =

Single by Simi

from the album Simisola
- Released: 15 February 2015
- Genre: Afropop; Alternative
- Length: 3:47
- Label: X3M
- Songwriter: Simisola Bolatito Ogunleye
- Producer: Oscar Herman-Ackah

Simi singles chronology
"E No Go Funny" (2015)	"Jamb Question" (2015)	"Open & Close" (2015)

"Jamb Question" is a song by Nigerian singer and songwriter Simi. It serves as the second single from her second studio album, Simisola (2017). Produced by Oscar Herman-Ackah, the song was released on 15 February 2015. Its official remix features vocals from Nigerian rapper Falz. The music video for "Jamb Question" was nominated for Best Soft Rock/Alternative Video at the 9th Nigerian Music Video Awards.

== Music video ==
The accompanying Mex-directed music video for "Jamb Question" premiered on 22 June 2015 through Simi's official Vevo account. Nigerian film producer and critic Charles Novia said he was "impressed" with the video and further said the song is reminiscent of Mo'Cheddah's hit "Dus Nambri", particularly in flow and rendition.

== Critical reception ==
Professional ratings
Review scores
Source	Rating
TooXclusive	4.5/5 stars
Jaguda	4/5 stars

JimmyKing of TooXclusive gave the song 4.5 stars out of 5, stating, "Simi's Jamb Question is an improvement from her hit single "Tiff". The melody progression of the beat with the saxophone accompaniment gave the song a very wonderful effect. Simi’s voice is unique and it did justice to the song. This Afro pop song is rich with African instrumentation. The Ad lib (backup) was well done with harmonious combination of two the voices. Jamb Question is really a great song". In the same vein, Sifon B. of Jaguda.com gave the song 4 stars out of 5, adding, "Jamb question puts in a blender Simi’s soothing voice, her comical lyrics, and a beautiful instrumental produced by Oscar, and the output is a smooth piece of auditory art".

== Awards and nominations ==
Year	Award ceremony	Prize	Result	Ref
2015	COSON Song Awards 2015	Most Uncommon Song	Nominated	
2015	9th Nigerian Music Video Awards	Best Soft Rock/Alternative Video	Nominated	
