= Oxlade (singer) =

Nigerian Afro-fusion musician

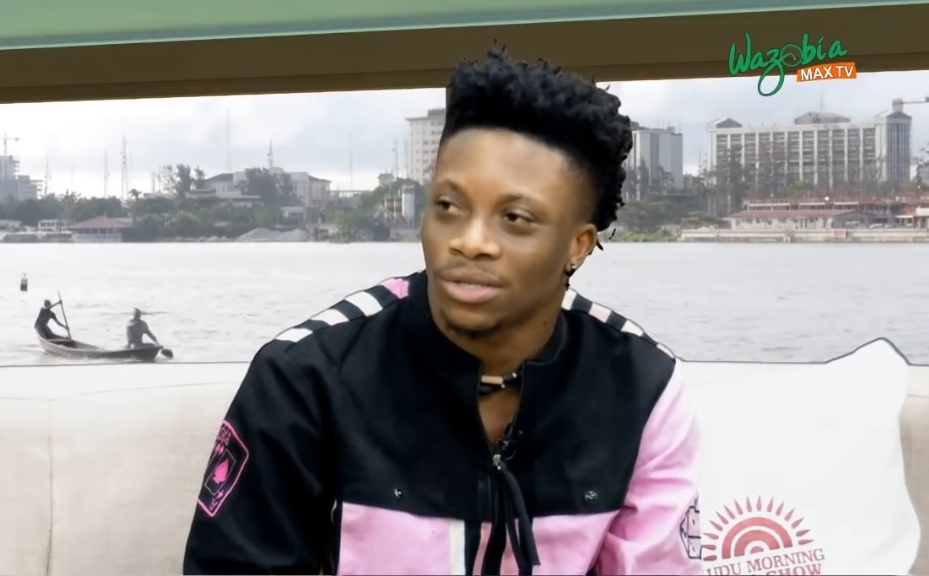
- Oxlade on WazobiaMax TV in 2019
- Born: Ikuforiji Olaitan Abdulrahman; 22 April 1997 (age 29); Surulere, Lagos
- Occupations: Singer; songwriter
- Years active: 2018–present
- Musical career
- Genres: Afro-fusion, R&B, alternative pop
- Instrument: Vocals
- Labels: Troniq Music; Epic Records; Columbia Records UK
- Website: www.oxladeofficial.com

Ikuforiji Olaitan Abdulrahman (born 22 April 1997), known professionally as Oxlade, is a Nigerian singer and songwriter signed to Troniq Music, Epic Records in France, and Columbia Records in the UK. He rose to prominence with the release of the song "Away", which appeared on Rolling Stone's 50 best songs of 2020. After the success of his 2022 single "Ku Lo Sa", Oxlade was named Pandora Africa's Next Artist in July 2022.

== Early life and career ==
Ikuforiji Olaitan Abdulrahman was born on 22 April 1997 in Surulere, a residential area of Lagos. After the passing of his mother when he was 3, he was raised by his father and grandmother. His father was a lecturer at Lagos State University, where he gained admission to study History and International Relations. He enrolled for two years before dropping off to pursue his musical career.

In 2018, he was approached by A&R executive Bizzle Osikoya, right after the release of "Mamiwota" by Blaqbonez, off the Bad Boy Blaq EP, released through 100 Crowns, an imprint of Chocolate City. After his meeting with Bizzle, he signed a management deal with The Plug. Thereafter he signed a publishing, licensing and distribution deal with The Plug Entertainment, and a record deal with Troniq Music. On 27 December 2018, Davido allowed Oxlade perform at City of David concert in Lagos, and he opened for Wizkid in London at Star Boy Fest in 2019.

On 13 April 2020, he released the music video for Away, directed by TG Omori for Troniq Music. On 15 April 2020, he tells, Tami Makinde of The Native, he was instructed by TG Omori, to sit on his lady's lap to personify the popular saying "behind every successful man is a woman". On 7 November 2020, Drake posted a screenshot on his Instagram story, listening to Away. Right after the Canadian rapper made the post, he gained 3 million streams within 24 hours. He achieved mainstream recognition with his hit track "Away", released as a single from his EP Oxygene, released through Troniq Music, and The Plug Entertainment, on 27 March 2020. "Away" appeared at number 23 on the Nigerian TurnTable Top 50 year-end chart of 2020. He released "DKT" independently on 3 September 2020 and its music video on 10 May 2021, which was shot and directed by Dammy Twitch.

In January 2021, his collaboration with Dolapo, and Ms Banks on their song "Interest", earned him his first entry on Capital XTRA Airplay Chart at number eleven on 18 February 2021, and also earned him his first career entry on the UK Afrobeats Singles Chart at number ten, and spent twelve consecutive weeks on the chart. On 15 January 2021, the music video for "Interest", was released and directed by Capone. In October 2021, he earned his second entry on the UK Afrobeats Singles Chart with his track "Ojuju", which is currently on chart for five consecutive weeks, since 3 October. It also peaked at number thirteen on Nigeria's TurnTable Top 50 weekly chart. On 3 September 2021, he released the official music video for "Ojuju", directed and shot by Ademola Falomo. He was featured on the single "Kolo" by Ice Prince, which spent eighteen consecutive weeks on chart, and peaked at number eight on TurnTable Top 50 weekly chart. On 11 March 2021, the music video for "Kolo", was released and directed by Director UAX.

He was featured on the song "Overdue" from the Coming 2 America soundtrack album Rhythms of Zamunda, curated by Sipho Dlamini, and released on 5 March 2021, through Def Jam Recordings Africa, and Def Jam Recordings. On 20 August 2021, Troniq Music, and Oxlade, released the four-tracks extended play Eclipse, produced solely by DJ Coublon, through Troniq Music, and Epic Records France. On 24 August 2021, Oxlade performed "Slow Down" by Skip Marley for The Grammy web series popularly known as Reimagined At Home. On 10 March 2022, Oxlade signed a new deal with Columbia Records UK. On 18 March 2022, he released "Want You", his first single in 2022, one month after the sex scander. The song was produced by TMXO, and mixed by Spax. The music video was released on 18 March 2022, and directed by Director UAX.

On 10 June 2022, he released "Ku Lo Sa", for ColorsxStudios. Following its release, a live-performing video was released on Colors YouTube channel, which has received over 1 million YouTube streams as of July 14, 2022. On 19 June 2022, it debuted at number 11 on the Official Afrobeats Chart Top 20 chart, and reached number 8 on 10 July 2022, exactly one month after its initial release. On 11 July 2022, it debuted at number 66 on the TurnTable Nigeria Top 100 chart. On 13 July 2022, Oxlade was named the first Pandora Africa's Next Artist. During their discussion, he talked about the constant surge of emerging artists in Nigeria and making a name for himself in America, Afro pop, and his growth as one of the fast-rising talents out of Africa. Following this, he performed "Want You" for Pandora Africa's Next Radio.

In February 2023, Oxlade took to his social media profiles and gave a promotional boost to "Seluna" by Snazzy the Optimist, who has worked with him as a songwriter. The same month, his 2022 single “Ku Lo Sa” received the Listener's Choice award at the Soundcity MVP Awards which was held at the Eko Convention Centre in Lagos State. On 19 May 2023, Oxlade released "Ovami" featuring fellow Nigerian singer Flavour, the second song from his upcoming studio album, Oxlade from Africa. The music video directed by Nigerian music video director Pink was released the same day. On 12 July the same year, he released his track "Intoxycated" featuring UK rapper Dave.

== Controversies ==
On 12 October 2020, Oxlade was injured during the EndSARS protest in Surulere, a commercial area in Lagos. Residents and fellow protesters reported the situation with the hashtag #EndSARS, with a video clip of Oxlade manager Ojah'B, who was seen being beaten as police violently shut down the protest.

On 8 February 2022, a sex tape of Oxlade's was leaked from Snapchat, and became a trending topic on Twitter. On 10 February 2022, the woman featured in the video publicly disclosed her intention to sue Oxlade for 20 million naira. On 12 February 2022, Oxlade apologized on Twitter to his fans and the woman in the video.

== Artistry ==
His voice as described by Efe Ukpebor of Nigerian Entertainment Today, is "smooth", with a seamless blend of musical genres. He describes his sound as a bridge between the Alte (Afro-fusion/experimental music expressions) and the mainstream. His lyrics are a mixture of English, and Pidgin English, often exploring contemporary topics such as love.

== Discography ==
=== EPs ===
List of extended plays with selected details
Title	EP details
Oxygene	Released: 27 March 2020; Label: Troniq Music, The Plug Entertainment; Formats: Digital download, streaming
Eclipse	Released: 20 August 2021; Label: Troniq Music, Epic; Formats: Digital download, streaming

=== Singles ===
==== As lead artist ====
List of charted singles, with selected chart positions
Title	Year	Peak chart positions										Certifications	Album
Title	Year	NG	CAN	IRE	NLD	NZ Hot	SA	SWE	UK	US Afro.	WW	Certifications	Album
"Away"	2020	— (Note: "Away" peaked at number 23 on the TurnTable Top 50 Yearly chart.)	—	—	—	—	—	—	—	—	—		Oxygene
"DKT"	2020	—	—	—	—	—	—	—	—	—	—		Non-album single
"Ojuju"	2021	13	—	—	—	—	—	—	— (Note: "Ojuju" did not enter the UK Singles Chart, but peaked at number 19 on the UK Afrobeats Singles Chart.)	—	—		Eclipse
"Want You"	2022	—	—	—	—	—	—	—	— (Note: "Want" did not enter the UK Singles Chart, but peaked at number 18 on the UK Afrobeats Singles Chart.)	47	—		TBA
"Ku Lo Sa"	2022	49	59	50	13	22	5	35	24	5	79	TCSN: Platinum; BPI: Platinum; GLF: Gold; MC: 2× Platinum; NVPI: Platinum; RIAA: Gold	OFA (Oxlade From Africa)
"Ovami" (with Flavour)	2023	—	—	—	—	—	—	—	—	—	—		OFA (Oxlade From Africa)
"Intoxycated" (featuring Dave)	2023	—	—	—	— (Note: "Intoxycated" did not enter the Single Top 100, but peaked at number 16 on the Single Tip chart.)	26	—	—	49	—	—		OFA (Oxlade From Africa)
"KATIGORI"	2023	—	—	—	—	—	—	—	—	—	—		OFA (Oxlade From Africa)
"PIANO"	2023	—	—	—	—	—	—	—	—	—	—		OFA (Oxlade From Africa)
"ARABAMBI"	2024	—	—	—	—	—	—	—	—	—	—		OFA (Oxlade From Africa)
"IFA" (with Fally Ipupa)	2024	—	—	—	—	—	—	—	—	—	—		OFA (Oxlade From Africa)
"ASUNASA (HOLD YOUR WAIST)" (with Wande Coal)	2024	—	—	—	—	—	—	—	—	—	—		OFA (Oxlade From Africa)
"BLESSED" (with Popcaan)	2024	—	—	—	—	—	—	—	—	—	—		OFA (Oxlade From Africa)
"D PTSD INTERLUDE" (with Bobi Wine)	2024	—	—	—	—	—	—	—	—	—	—		OFA (Oxlade From Africa)
"OLOLUFE" (with Sarkodie)	2024	—	—	—	—	—	—	—	—	—	—		OFA (Oxlade From Africa)
"ON MY MIND (OMM)" (with Tomi Owó & Ojahbee)	2024	—	—	—	—	—	—	—	—	—	—		OFA (Oxlade From Africa)
"—" denotes a recording that did not chart or was not released in that territory.

==== As featured artist ====
List of charted singles as a featured artist, with selected chart positions
Title	Year	Peak chart positions		Album
Title	Year	NG	UK Afro. (Note: "Interest" did not enter the UK Singles Chart, but peaked at number 10 on the UK Afrobeats Singles Chart.)	Album
"Interest" (with Dolapo and Ms Banks)	2021	—	10	TBA
"Kolo" (Ice Prince featuring Oxlade)	2021	8	—	TBA

== Filmography ==
Year	Title	Role	Notes
2020	Like Someone's Watching	Oxlade	Main cast

== Awards and nominations ==
Year	Event	Prize	Recipient	Result	Ref
2021	African Entertainment Awards USA	Best New Artist	Himself	Nominated	
2021	All Africa Music Awards	Best Artist, Duo or Group in African RnB & Soul	Himself	Nominated	
2020	City People Music Awards	Next Rated Artiste (Male)	Himself	Nominated	
2020	The Headies	Next Rated	Himself	Nominated	
2019	The Headies	Rookie of the year	Himself	Nominated	
2022	All Africa Music Awards	African Fan's Favorite	Himself	Won	
2023	Soundcity MVP Awards Festival	Song of the Year	Ku Lo Sa	Nominated	
2023	Soundcity MVP Awards Festival	Listener's Choice	Himself	Won	
2023	The Headies	Best Recording of the Year	Ku Lo Sa	Nominated	
2023	The Headies	Viewer's Choice	Ku Lo Sa	Nominated	
2023	The Headies	Song of the Year	Ku Lo Sa	Nominated	
2023	The Headies	Best Vocal Performance (Male)	Himself for Ku Lo Sa	Nominated	
