= Joromi =

Joromi may refer to:

- "Joromi", a 1965 song by Victor Uwaifo
- "Joromi", a song by Simi from the 2017 album Simisola
