= Gold (Adekunle Gold album) =

Studio album by Adekunle Gold
- Released: July 28, 2016
- Recorded: 2014–2016
- Genre: Afro-soul; neo soul; afropop
- Length: 55:00
- Label: YBNL
- Producer: B Banks; Masterkraft; Oscar Heman-Ackah; Pheelz; SeyiKeyz; Sleekamo

Adekunle Gold chronology
Gold (2016)	About 30 (2018)

Singles from Gold
- 1. "Sade" Released: 19 December 2014; 2. "Orente" Released: 1 July 2015; 3. "Pick Up" Released: 1 December 2015; 4. "Ready" Released: 4 April 2016; 5. "My Life" Released: 14 November 2016; 6. "Work" Released: 1 May 2017

Gold is the debut studio album of Nigerian recording artist Adekunle Gold, released on 28 July 2016, by YBNL Nation. It features one guest appearance from Simi and production from B Banks, Masterkraft, Oscar Heman-Ackah, Pheelz, SeyiKeyz, and Sleekamo. Prior to its release, six singles were released off the album to positive reviews, with "Sade" and "Orente" being his breakthrough singles. The album peaked at #7 on Billboard's World Album Charts for the week of 13 August 2016.

== Singles ==
The album's lead single "Sade" was released on 19 December 2014. It was produced by Olaitan Dada. Its re-release was released on 5 March 2015 and produced by Pheelz alongside its music video directed by Adasa Cookey. The second single, "Orente", was released on 1 July 2015. It was produced by Oscar Heman-Ackah and features strings by Fiokee. The third single off the album was released on 1 December 2015, entitled "Pick Up". It was produced by Pheelz. Gold’s fourth single "Ready" was released on 4 April 2016. It was produced by Pheelz, mastered by Simi, and features guitars from Fiokee. The fifth single, "My Life", was released on 14 November 2016. The sixth and final single off the album, "Work" was officially released on 1 May 2017. The song was produced by B.Banks and its release coincided with the single's accompanying music video directed by Mr. Moe Musa.

== Critical reception ==
Professional ratings
Review scores
Source	Rating
NotJustOk	7.5/10
Pulse Nigeria	4/5 stars
Filter Free Nigeria	94%
tooXclusive	3/5 stars

The album received positive reviews from music critics. Joey Akan of Pulse Nigeria praised the album as "a fantastic album" that showcased his ability to craft a unique path in mainstream Nigerian music, blending local highlife with relatable stories and purist melodies. The album was commended for its conceptual strength, standout tracks like “No Forget” with Simi, and its consistent delivery, despite slight monotony. He rated it 4/5, calling it "Smoking Hot." Temitope Delano of tooXclusive found Gold to be a mixed effort, describing it as "a tad bit claustrophobic" with some shallow moments but also recognizing its "few brilliant tracks" and "amazing production." Despite falling short of expectations in depth and delivery, the album showcased Gold's ability to connect emotionally through relatable themes and innovative sounds, earning a rating of 3/5.

Tola Sarumi of NotJustOk described Gold as "mature pop" that combines storytelling, vulnerability, and nuanced production, showcasing his artistry and everyman charm. Despite some melody recycling and a few underwhelming tracks, the album delivered standout songs like "Work," "No Forget," and "Ariwo Ko" and proved that "Adekunle Gold, on this evidence, should be around for a while." It was rated 7.5/10. Online magazine Filter Free scored Gold 94%, explaining that "this album comes from a deep place of artistic excellence... it deserves applause." Wilfred Okiche of 360nobs described the album as a "safe pop album" that showcases his influences, including jùjú, highlife, and Afro jùjú, but lacks a clear artistic identity. The album balances themes of faith and love with tracks like "Pick Up" aggressively pushing a divine intervention narrative, while songs like "Work" and "Paradise" stand out for their adventurous sound and fine songwriting. Okiche concluded that while Gold is "sugary sweet" and appealing, Adekunle Gold has yet to prove himself as "the real deal."

=== Accolades ===
Gold was nominated for Album of the Year at the 2017 Nigeria Entertainment Awards. It was also nominated for Album of the Year and Best R&B/Pop Album at The Headies 2018.

Year	Awards ceremony	Award description(s)	Results
2017	Nigeria Entertainment Awards	Album of the Year	Nominated
2018	The Headies	Best R&B/Pop Album	Nominated
2018	The Headies	Album of the Year	Nominated

== Track listing ==
No.	Title	Writer(s)	Producer(s)	Length
1.	"Gold (Intro)"	Adekunle Kosoko	SeyiKeyz	1:17
2.	"My Life"	Kosoko	SeyiKeyz	3:07
3.	"Beautiful Night"	Kosoko	Oscar Heman-Ackah	3:57
4.	"Orente"	Kosoko	Oscar Heman-Ackah	3:36
5.	"Nurse Alabere"	Kosoko	SeyiKeyz	3:40
6.	"Friend Zone"	Kosoko	Pheelz	3:27
7.	"Paradise"	Kosoko	Pheelz	3:10
8.	"No Forget" (featuring Simi)	Kosoko; Simisola Ogunleye	Oscar Heman-Ackah	4:00
9.	"Pick Up"	Kosoko	Pheelz	3:22
10.	"Work"	Kosoko	B.Banks	3:23
11.	"Temptation"	Kosoko	Sleekamo	3:30
12.	"Ariwo Ko"	Kosoko	Pheelz	3:04
13.	"Fight for You"	Kosoko	Oscar Heman-Ackah	4:15
14.	"Ready"	Kosoko	Pheelz	3:36
15.	"Sweet Me"	Kosoko	Masterkraft	3:15
Total length:				54:29

Bonus tracks
No.	Title	Writer(s)	Producer(s)	Length
16.	"Sade"	Kosoko	Pheelz	3:46

== Charts ==
=== Weekly charts ===
Chart performance for Gold
Chart (2016)	Peak position
US World Albums (Billboard)	7
