= OFA (Oxlade From Africa) =

Studio album by Oxlade
- Released: 20 September 2024
- Recorded: 2022–2024
- Genre: Afrobeats; amapiano; Afroswing; R&B; coupé décalé
- Length: 45:30
- Label: Troniq; Epic
- Producer: P.Priime; Dre Skull; Egar Boi; Puffy; DeeYasso; Timmy; T.U.C; Magicsticks; Ozedikus; Oxlade; Spax; The Kazes; Ojahbee; TMXO

Oxlade chronology
Eclipse (2021)	OFA (Oxlade From Africa) (2024)

Singles from OFA (Oxlade From Africa)
- 1. "Ku Lo Sa" Released: 21 October 2022; 2. "Ovami" Released: 19 May 2023; 3. "Intoxycated" Released: 13 July 2023; 4. "Katigori" Released: 17 November 2023; 5. "Piano" Released: 17 November 2023; 6. "Arabambi" Released: 14 June 2024; 7. "Ifa" Released: 23 August 2024

OFA (Oxlade From Africa) is the debut studio album by Nigerian singer Oxlade. It was released on 20 September 2024, through Troniq Music and Epic Records. The album features guest appearances from Flavour, Dave, Fally Ipupa, Wande Coal, Ojahbee, Popcaan, Tomi Owó and Bobi Wine. Production was handled by P.Priime, Dre Skull, Egar Boi, Puffy, DeeYasso, Timmy, T.U.C, Magicsticks, Ozedikus, Spax, The Kazes, Ojahbee, TMXO and Oxlade himself. The album was preceded by seven singles— "Ku Lo Sa," "Ovami," "Intoxycated," "Katigori," "Piano," "Arabambi," and "Ifa."

== Concept and themes ==
Oxlade From Africa blends vintage African sounds with modern Afrobeats, showcasing Oxlade's ability to bridge generations musically. In an interview with OkayAfrica, he described the project as "a body of work that travels through time and rhythm." The album addresses personal and sociopolitical themes, with "D PTSD Interlude" commenting on police brutality and the #EndSARS movement. Oxlade also reflects on his identity, particularly on the track "Olaitan (Olaoluwa)," drawing inspiration from his name, which means "unending favor."

== Singles ==
The album's lead single "Ku Lo Sa" premiered live as a Colors Show performance on 10 June 2022. The song, produced by Ozedikus, released as an official single on 21 October 2022, alongside a Director X-directed music video. The second single, "Ovami," features fellow Nigerian singer Flavour and was released on 19 May 2023. The song was produced by Magicsticks and Oxlade. The third single "Intoxycated" features British rapper Dave and was released on 13 July 2023. The song was produced by Deeyasso, Spax, and The Kazes. The album's fourth and fifth singles "Katigori" and "Piano" were both released on 17 November 2023. "Katigori" was produced by Timmy and "Piano" was produced by P.Priime. "'Katigori' is a three-year-old record, it was created in a space where I had fame but not success. It was me manifesting where I am now and prophesying my future because I feel like there’s a moment in my music career where everybody will accept that I’m the GOAT. On the other hand, 'Piano' is a result of all my fast-paced records that didn’t get the blessings they deserved," Oxlade says about the tracks. The TMXO-produced sixth single "Arabambi" was released on 14 June 2024 alongside a music video shot and directed between St Lucia and Lagos by Montecarlo Dream. According to him, the song's melody was inspired by the American singer Miguel and the way he uses his vocals. “It’s a love song but it’s still me in my braggadocious elements. It is the original song I was meant to perform for ColorsxStudios before I swapped it for ‘Ku Lo Sa’,” he commented. The seventh and final single "Ifa" features Fally Ipupa and was released on 23 August 2024. The song was produced by Egar Boi.

== Critical reception ==
Adeayo Adebiyi of Pulse Nigeria critiqued Oxlade From Africa, stating it "didn't do for Oxlade what it should nor did it have what it takes to propel him to the next level," and noted that the album struggled with direction and execution, ultimately resulting in an average rating of 5/10. Adebiyi emphasized that while the album included glimpses of Oxlade's talent, it largely failed to deliver excitement or innovation, with much of its appeal found in pre-released singles rather than the new material.

TJ Martins of Album Talks reviewed Oxlade From Africa, noting that while the album featured "some worthwhile moments," it ultimately struggled with execution and thematic depth, culminating in an overall rating of 6/10. Martins pointed out that Oxlade's attempt to explore deeper themes felt "pretentious and contrived," as the music did not match the ambitious aesthetic, leading to a collection of pop songs that, despite their catchiness, failed to showcase his full artistic potential.

Olukorede Owoeye of Nigerian Entertainment Today reviewed Oxlade From Africa, stating that the project "suffers from a wide range of issues," primarily due to its late release and lack of coherence in direction, which ultimately made it feel rushed and underwhelming. Despite its potential, the album failed to capitalize on Oxlade's previous success with "Ku Lo Sa," and Owoeye described it as lacking a "coherent pattern of self-expression," emphasizing that it feels like a missed opportunity for the artist.

== Track listing ==
Oxlade From Africa track listing
No.	Title	Writer(s)	Producer(s)	Length
1.	"D PTSD Interlude" (featuring Bobi Wine)	Olaitan Ikuforiji		1:33
2.	"Olaitan (Olaoluwa)"	Ikuforiji; Samuel Adetiloye	Timmy	3:03
3.	"Blessed" (featuring Popcaan)	Ikuforiji; Andrae Sutherland; Andrew Hershey	Dre Skull	3:31
4.	"Intoxycated" (featuring Dave)	Ikuforiji; David Omoregie; Akano Samuel; Dennis Yasso; Kehinde Adeoye; Taiwo Temilade	DeeYasso; Spax; The Kazes	3:32
5.	"Ifa" (featuring Fally Ipupa)	Ikuforiji; Ernest Itiveh	Egar Boi	3:38
6.	"Ku Lo Sa"	Ikuforiji; Igbinoba Osaze	Ozedikus	2:28
7.	"Ovami" (featuring Flavour)	Ikuforiji; Chinedu Okoli; Kareem Temitayo	Magicsticks; Oxlade	3:24
8.	"Arabambi"	Ikuforiji; Timi Aladeloba; Kehinde Kassim; Taiwo Kassim	TMXO	3:10
9.	"Tamuno" (interlude)	Ikuforiji		1:41
10.	"Asunasa (Hold Your Waist)" (featuring Wande Coal)	Ikuforiji; Oluwatobi Ojosipe; Hyacinth Obidi	T.U.C	3:05
11.	"Piano"	Ikuforiji; Peace Oredope	P.Priime	2:47
12.	"Ololufe" (featuring Sarkodie)	Ikuforiji; Itiveh	Egar Boi	2:20
13.	"RMF"	Ikuforiji; Adeneye Oluwatosin; K. Kassim; T. Kassim	Puffy	2:58
14.	"On My Mind (OMM)" (featuring Tomi Owó and Ojahbee)	Ikuforiji; Ojabodu Ademola; T. Kassim; K. Kassim; Jacob Hunter	Ojahbee	3:06
15.	"Katigori"	Ikuforiji; Adetiloye	Timmy	2:58
16.	"OFA"	Ikuforiji; Samuel	Spax	2:10
Total length:				45:30

== Release history ==
Release history and formats for OFA (Oxlade From Africa)
Region	Date	Format	Label
Various	20 September 2024	Streaming; digital download	Troniq; Epic
