= About 30 =

Studio album by Adekunle Gold
- Released: 25 May 2018
- Genre: Afrobeat; highlife; pop
- Length: 55:00
- Label: Afro Urban; Empire
- Producer: Seyikeyz; Pheelz; Jay Weathers; Vtek; PRGRSHN

Adekunle Gold chronology
Gold (2016)	About 30 (2018)	Afro Pop Vol. 1 (2020)

Singles from About 30
- 1. "Call on Me" Released: 1 July 2017; 2. "Money" Released: 20 October 2017; 3. "Ire" Released: 23 February 2018

About 30 is the second studio album by Nigerian singer Adekunle Gold. It was released on 25 May 2018, by his independent record label Afro Urban Records and distributed by Empire Distribution. The album features guest appearances from Seun Kuti, Flavour, Dyo, Jacob Banks and the London Community Gospel Choir. Adekunle Gold enlisted production from Pheelz, Seyikeyz, Vtek, PRGRSHN and Jay Weathers.

== Background ==
Adekunle Gold began conceptualizing About 30 while still working on his debut album Gold (2016). He linked the two albums, with About 30 picking up from where Gold left off. "Gold ended at 16, About 30 starts from 17," Gold explained in an interview with OkayAfrica. Thematically, the album reflects on turning 30 and his personal growth. "I asked myself, 'So my twenties just passed like that? What did I even do?' But then I remember the things that got me here, and I'm like, 'I did pretty well,'" he shared. The album blends Afrobeat, pop, and highlife, with collaborations from Seun Kuti, Dyo, and Jacob Banks. Gold expanded his sound: "With About 30 I took it up a notch... I featured more people." The album was recorded in Lagos, Ghana, the United States, and during flights. He wrote "There Is a God" while on a plane: "That's when I get to write... I want to think."

== Singles ==
The album's lead single "Call on Me" was released on 1 July 2017. The song was produced by Pheelz. The second single "Money" was released on 20 October 2017 and was also produced by Pheelz. The same day, Gold announced a Lagos concert on 26 December 2017. The third single, "Ire" arrived on 23 February 2018, with a video directed by Ani James of Aje Filmworks. The song, which was produced by Seyikeyz, is a tribute to Adekunle Gold's late sister, who died in 2011 to heart complications.

== Critical reception ==
The album received generally positive reviews from critics. In Ehis Ohunyon's review for Pulse Nigeria, he praised About 30 as a "refreshing and solid alternative" amidst the saturated pop scene. He highlighted the album's themes of love, growth, and purpose, and commended Gold for his artistic growth and collaborations. While the album is described as cohesive and mature, Ohunyon noted that it plays it safe and can feel "monotonous" at times, though it still strengthens Gold's legacy. He rated the album 4/5. Linda Orajekwe of NotJustOk described About 30 as a deeply personal and reflective album, showcasing Adekunle Gold's growth and touching on themes like love, heartbreak, God, and family. She praised the "great thoughtful music" and the contributions of the 79th Element band, ranking the album 10/10 and encouraging listeners to support its creative excellence.

Wilfred Okiche of 360nobs found About 30 to be melodic and appealing to fans but criticized it for being "fluffy and gimmicky," with heavy reliance on guest artists to elevate its quality. While praising its adaptability for live performances, Okiche concluded, "To get a more convincing view of Adekunle Gold and the goodness he is capable of, skip the albums and grab a front row seat at his next live concert." Oris Aigbokhaevbolo, writing for Music in Africa, highlighted About 30 as a showcase of Gold's transition from "loser to winner", reflecting on his improved circumstances without over-celebrating. While the album's refined and varied sound stands out, including live band performances and collaborations with artists like Seun Kuti and Flavour, Aigbokhaevbolo noted some shortcomings in the songwriting, describing parts as lacking depth or novelty despite Adekunle Gold's growth in musicality.

=== Accolades ===
About 30 was nominated for Best R&B/Pop Album and Album of the Year at The Headies 2019.

== Track listing ==
About 30 track listing
No.	Title	Writer(s)	Producer(s)	Length
1.	"Ire"	Adekunle Kosoko	Seyikeyz	4:57
2.	"Down With You" (featuring Dyo)	Kosoko; Dayo Olatunji	Prgrshn; Jay Weathers	2:58
3.	"Mr. Foolish" (featuring Seun Kuti)	Kosoko	Seyikeyz; Pheelz	4:02
4.	"Surrender"	Kosoko	Pheelz	3:03
5.	"Damn, Delilah"	Kosoko	Seyikeyz	2:51
6.	"Yoyo" (featuring Flavour)	Kosoko; Chinedu Okoli	Seyikeyz	3:25
7.	"Money"	Kosoko	Pheelz	3:05
8.	"Pablo Alakori"	Kosoko	Vtek	3:33
9.	"Remember"	Kosoko; Nathaniel Warner; Alastair O'Donnell; Mohammed Animashaun	Jay Weathers	2:55
10.	"Fame"	Kosoko; Efe Oraka	Seyikeyz	2:57
11.	"Somebody"	Kosoko; Simisola Ogunleye	Pheelz	2:54
12.	"Mama"	Kosoko	Pheelz	3:02
13.	"There Is a God" (featuring LCGC)	Kosoko	Seyikeyz; Pheelz	4:03
14.	"Back to Start"	Kosoko	Pheelz	3:04
Total length:				55:00

Bonus tracks
No.	Title	Writer(s)	Producer(s)	Length
15.	"Ire" (remix; featuring Jacob Banks)	Kosoko; Jacob Akinoso	Seyikeyz	4:54
16.	"Call on Me"	Kosoko	Pheelz	4:54
