= Want You (song) =

Single by Oxlade
- Released: March 18, 2022
- Genre: Afro-Fusion
- Label: Troniq; Epic
- Songwriter: Ikuforiji Olaitan Abdulrahman
- Producer: TMXO

Oxlade singles chronology
"Ojuju" (2021)	"Want You" (2022)	"Ku Lo Sa" (2022)

Music video
- "Want You" on YouTube

"Want You" is a song by Nigerian singer Oxlade. It was released on 18 March 2022, through Troniq Music, and distributed by Epic Records, in France and Columbia Records, in the UK. "Want You" was written by Oxlade, and produced by TMXO. It also peaked at number 47 on the Billboard U.S. Afrobeats Songs Chart and number 18 on the UK Afrobeats Singles Chart.

== Background ==
On 10 March 2022, he signed a record deal with Columbia Records UK. He released "Want You" on 18 March 2022, through Troniq Music, and Epic Records France. The record was produced by TMXO.

== Music video ==
On 18 March 2022, he released the official music video to "Want You", shot and directed by Seyi Akinlade for UAX Studio.

== Commercial performance ==
During the debut week of Billboard U.S. Afrobeats Songs chart, "Want You" peaked at number forty-seven. "Want You" peaked at number eighteen on the UK Afrobeats Singles Chart. "Want You" was named on The Native's songs of the day on 18 March 2020. On 13 July 2022, "Want You" debuted on the newly renamed TurnTable Top TV Songs, formerly TV Top Songs, at number 21.

== Charts ==
Chart performance for "Want You"
Chart (2022)	Peak position
Nigeria Top TV Songs (TurnTable)	21
UK Afrobeats (OCC)	18
US Afrobeats Songs (Billboard)	47

== Personnel ==
- Ikuforiji Olaitan Abdulrahman - Primary artist, writer
- TMXO - Producer
- Spax - Mixed and Mastered
