= Omo Charlie Champagne, Vol. 1 =

Studio album by Simi
- Released: April 19, 2019
- Recorded: 2018–19
- Genres: Sentimental ballad; Afropop; Afro-soul; R&B; EDM; moombahton
- Length: 38:00
- Label: X3M Music
- Producers: Oscar; Vtek; Legendury Beatz; Sess

Simi chronology
Simisola (2017)	Omo Charlie Champagne, Vol. 1 (2019)	Restless II (2020)

Singles from Omo Charlie Champagne, Vol. 1
- 1. "I Dun Care" Released: August 10, 2018; 2. "Lovin" Released: November 2, 2018; 3. "Ayo" Released: January 24, 2019

Omo Charlie Champagne, Vol. 1 is the third studio album by Nigerian singer Simi. It was released to coincide with her thirty-first birthday on April 19, 2019. The album has thirteen tracks and features collaborations with Patoranking, Maleek Berry, Falz, and her husband Adekunle Gold. It was primarily produced by Oscar, with additional production from Vtek, Legendury Beatz and Sess. Simi dedicated the album to her father Charles Oladele Ogunleye, who died in 2014. Omo Charlie Champagne, Vol. 1 was supported by the singles "I Dun Care", "Lovin" and "Ayo".

== Background and promotion ==
In March 2019, Simi said she would be releasing her third studio album, Omo Charlie Champagne, Vol. 1, to coincide with her birthday on April 19, 2019. She disclosed this information in a series of social media messages. The album is a slight departure from the relatively afro-centric feel of Simisola, and is a mixture of sentimental ballad, Afropop, Afro-soul, R&B, EDM and moombahton. Its title is a direct reference to her late father Charles Oladele Ogunleye. Omo Charlie Champagne, Vol. 1 tackles themes of loss, happiness, loyalty, fears, break-up and sex.

"I Dun Care" was released as the album's lead single on August 10, 2018. It was produced by Oscar and recorded in Yoruba and English. The song focuses on themes of love and relationship. The accompanying music video for "I Dun Care" was filmed by Clarence Peters. The album's second single, "Lovin", was released on November 2, 2018. It was also produced by Oscar and contains a guitar riff by OC Omofuma. In "Lovin", Simi sings about the beauty of her love interest and her desire to see him and be intimate with him. Wale Owoade of Pan African Music praised the song's vibe and lyricism. The video for "Lovin" was directed by Aje Filmworks and is consistent with the song's lyrics.

The Jùjú-inspired track "Ayo" (Yoruba: Joy) was released on January 24, 2019, as the album's third single. It was produced by the production duo Legendury Beatz and is inspired by the music of Ebenezer Obey. TooXclusive's Tomiwa described the song as "a mid-tempo jam". The music video for "Ayo" was recorded by Director K and depicts the daily life of Lagosians in inhospitable environments. On June 21, 2019, Simi released the music video for the Patoranking-assisted song "Jericho". The accompanying music video for the song was directed by Adasa Cookey and mirrors a 1990s party. On July 19, 2019, Simi released the music video for "By You", which was filmed in Los Angeles and features footage from Simi and Adekunle Gold's adventure across the city. Randy's Donuts, the bakery and landmark building, is featured in the video.

== Composition ==
The album opens with "Charlie", a soulful record that mourns Simi's father and pays tribute to him. The Vtek-produced track "Jericho" is a romantic reggaeton tune. In the emotive duet "By You", Simi and Adekunle Gold exchange vows and commit to their love. The Maleek Berry-assisted track "Immortal" has been described as an "expression of sensual sentiments" exemplified by lyrics like "Hold on tight for the ride of your life/don’t let go now/We can go all night". The catchy track "Love on Me" features a call and response chorus.

"Move On" is an ode to heartbreak. "The Artist", a skit, highlights the struggles that artists endure in the industry. In "Mind Your Bizness", Falz and Simi cautioned listeners against gossiping. On the album's closing track "Hide and Seek", Simi wields her vulnerability with confidence and sex appeal.

== Critical reception ==
Professional ratings
Review scores
Source	Rating
Pulse Nigeria	9.1/10
NotJustOk	4.5/5 stars
The Star	3/5 stars

Omo Charlie Champagne, Vol. 1 received positive reviews from music critics. Pulse Nigeria's Motolani Alake awarded the album a rating of 9.1 out of 10, calling it "excellent" and saying songs such as "Jericho", "Immortal", "Move On" and "Hide and Seek" showcase Simi as an "evolving artist that understands the need to evolve without necessarily betraying her brand". A writer for NotJustOk gave the album 4.5 stars out of 5, acknowledging Simi for "experimenting with different sounds without changing the core element of her unique style".

The Native's Debola Abimbolu said the album "listens even closer to the promised-land destination Simi has been inching toward since her music career kicked off with Ogaju in 2008" and that "her clever lines and captivating vocals have captured the zeitgeist". Reviewing for The Star newspaper, Davies Ndolo granted the record a 3/5 rating, acknowledging Simi's voice and saying she "manages to give her audience an experience" despite the album's air of familiarity.

== Track listing ==
No.	Title	Writer(s)	Producer(s)	Length
1.	"Charlie"	Simisola Ogunleye	Oscar	2:03
2.	"Ayo"	Ogunleye	Legendury Beatz	3:44
3.	"Jericho" (featuring Patoranking)	Ogunleye; Patrick Okorie	Vtek	3:15
4.	"By You" (featuring Adekunle Gold)	Ogunleye; Adekunle Kosoko	Oscar	3:38
5.	"Immortal" (featuring Maleek Berry)	Ogunleye; Maleek Shoyebi	Sess	3:17
6.	"Love on Me"	Ogunleye	Vtek	2:40
7.	"The Artist"	Ogunleye	—	0:52
8.	"Move On"	Ogunleye	Oscar	3:28
9.	"Mind Your Business" (featuring Falz)	Ogunleye; Folarin Falana	Vtek	3:15
10.	"Lovin"	Ogunleye	Oscar	3:36
11.	"Please"	Ogunleye	Oscar	2:17
12.	"I Dun Care"	Ogunleye	Oscar	3:39
13.	"Hide and Seek"	Ogunleye	Oscar	3:07
Total length:				38:00

Notes

- "—" denotes a skit

== Personnel ==
- Simisola Ogunleye – primary artist, writer
- Patrick Okorie – featured artist, writer
- Adekunle Kosoko – featured artist, writer
- Maleek Shoyebi – featured artist, writer
- Folarin Falana – featured artist, writer
- Oscar – production (tracks 1, 4, 8, 10, 11, 12, 13)
- Vtek – production (tracks 3, 6, 9)
- Legendury Beatz – (track 2)
- Sess – (track 5)
- Fiokee – guitar (track 2)
- OC Omofuma – guitar (tracks 4, 10)
- Okwi – trumpet (track 1)
- Alaba – percussion

== Release history ==
Region	Date	Format	Label	Ref
Various	April 19, 2019	CD, Digital download	X3M Music	
