= Ku Lo Sa =

2022 single by Oxlade

Single by Oxlade

from the album OFA (Oxlade From Africa)
- Released: 10 June 2022 (live version); 21 October 2022 (official version); 9 December 2022 (Camila Cabello remix)
- Genre: Afrobeats
- Length: 2:28 (A Colors Show live version or Camila Cabello remix); 2:27 (official version)
- Label: Troniq; Epic
- Producer: Ozedikus Nwanne

Oxlade singles chronology
"Want You" (2022)	"Ku Lo Sa" (2022)	"Clueless" (2023)

Remix cover
- Camila Cabello remix cover

Camila Cabello singles chronology
"Mon amour" (2022)	"Ku Lo Sa" (2022)	"I Luv It" (2024)

Music video
- "Ku Lo Sa" on YouTube

"Ku Lo Sa" (stylized in all caps) is a song by Nigerian singer Oxlade. It was officially released on 21 October 2022 through Troniq Music and Epic Records. Prior to its official release, a live-performing video was released on Colors YouTube channel, which has received over 197 million YouTube streams as of 18 October 2026. A remix along with American singer Camila Cabello was released on 9 December 2022 with new verses from Cabello.

== Background ==
In an interview with OkayAfrica, Oxlade said he recorded "Ku Lo Sa" two days after a personal setback and did not expect its impact. The song was first planned as a follow-up to "Want You" but gained wide attention after his ColorsxStudios performance, which went viral and helped establish it as his breakthrough song. The beat, produced by Ozedikus, was originally made for Wizkid and was recorded with Oxlade in under an hour during a brief studio session, with Colors later choosing to release the raw, unmixed version of the song. Oxlade later said he performed "Ku Lo Sa" for Colors while dealing with a personal tragedy the day before the shoot, a moment he described as being at his lowest, which shaped the emotion of the performance.

== Colors show video ==
"Ku Lo Sa" was released officially on 10 June 2022 alongside a Colors show video. The video features Oxlade behind a green backdrop near a mic dressed in a black patent leather outfit, black boots with orange soles, and slim shades, as he sings the song.

== Accolades ==
Awards and nominations for "Ku Lo Sa"
Year	Organization	Award	Result	Ref.
2023	Soundcity MVP Awards Festival	Song of the Year	Nominated	
2023	Soundcity MVP Awards Festival	Listener's Choice	Won	
2023	African Entertainment Awards USA	Song of the Year	Nominated	
2023	The Headies	Best Recording of the Year	Nominated	
2023	The Headies	Best Vocal Performance (Male) (Oxlade for "Ku Lo Sa")	Nominated	
2023	The Headies	Viewer's Choice	Nominated	
2023	The Headies	Song of the Year	Nominated	

== Charts ==
=== Weekly charts ===
Weekly chart performance for "Ku Lo Sa"
Chart (2022–2023)	Peak position
Belgium (Ultratop 50 Wallonia)	32
Canada (Canadian Hot 100)	59
France (SNEP)	18
Global 200 (Billboard)	79
Ireland (IRMA)	50
Luxembourg (Billboard)	12
Netherlands (Single Top 100)	13
New Zealand Hot Singles (RMNZ)	22
Portugal (AFP)	60
South Africa Streaming (TOSAC)	5
Suriname (Nationale Top 40)	2
Sweden (Sverigetopplistan)	35
Switzerland (Schweizer Hitparade)	14
UK Singles (Official Charts)	24
UK Afrobeats (Official Charts)	2
UK Hip Hop/R&B (Official Charts)	7
US Afrobeats Songs (Billboard)	5
US Rhythmic (Billboard)	19

=== Year-end charts ===
2022 year-end chart performance for "Ku Lo Sa"
Chart (2022)	Position
Belgium (Ultratop Wallonia)	174
France (SNEP)	141
Netherlands (Single Top 100)	75
Switzerland (Schweizer Hitparade)	78
US Afrobeats Songs (Billboard)	11

2023 year-end chart performance for "Ku Lo Sa"
Chart (2023)	Position
Netherlands (Single Top 100)	99

== Certifications ==
Certifications for "Ku Lo Sa"
Region	Certification	Certified units/sales
Canada (Music Canada)	2× Platinum	160,000^{‡}
Denmark (IFPI Danmark)	Gold	45,000^{‡}
France (SNEP)	Diamond	333,333^{‡}
Netherlands (NVPI)	Platinum	93,000^{‡}
New Zealand (RMNZ)	Platinum	30,000^{‡}
Nigeria (TCSN)	Platinum	100,000^{‡}
Portugal (AFP)	Gold	5,000^{‡}
Spain (Promusicae)	Gold	30,000^{‡}
Switzerland (IFPI Switzerland)	Platinum	20,000^{‡}
United Kingdom (BPI)	Platinum	600,000^{‡}
United States (RIAA)	Gold	500,000^{‡}
Streaming
Sweden (GLF)	Gold	4,000,000^{†}
^{‡} Sales+streaming figures based on certification alone.^{†} Streaming-only figures based on certification alone.

== Release history ==
Release date and format(s) for "Ku Lo Sa"
Region	Date	Format(s)	Version	Label	Ref.
Various	10 June 2022	Digital download; streaming	Live (A Colors Show)	Troniq; Epic	
Various	21 October 2022	Digital download; streaming	Studio	Troniq; Epic	
Various	8 December 2022	Digital download; streaming	Camila Cabello remix	Troniq; Epic	
