= Sade (Adekunle Gold song) =

Single by Adekunle Gold

from the album Gold
- Language: Yoruba; Nigerian Pidgin
- Released: 19 December 2014
- Recorded: May 2013—November 2014
- Genre: Folk-pop
- Length: 3:46
- Label: Self-released (original); YBNL Nation (re-release)
- Songwriter: Adekunle Almoruf Kosoko
- Producer: Pheelz

Adekunle Gold singles chronology
"Sade" (2014)	"Orente" (2015)

Music video
- "Sade" on YouTube

"Sade" (Yoruba pronunciation: [ʃà.dé]) is the debut solo single by Nigerian singer Adekunle Gold. It was originally self-released on 19 December 2014, and re-released on 5 March 2015 by YBNL Nation to coincide with his official signing to the label. The re-release was produced by Pheelz, and was re-released for legal reasons. Mainly sung in Yoruba and Nigerian Pidgin, "Sade" was the lead single from his debut studio album Gold (2016). It is a highlife cover of One Direction's "Story of My Life".

== Background ==
"Sade" is a highlife cover of One Direction's "Story of My Life," reimagined with Afro-juju and folk influences. Adekunle Gold drew inspiration for the track during a moment of traffic in Lagos in May 2013, when he first heard the original song and began freestyling the hook. By November 2014, he had completed the song and worked with producer Olaitan Dada, who added talking drums to complete its production.

At the time, Adekunle Gold was balancing a career as a graphic designer with aspirations of making music. He had designed logos and artwork for YBNL Nation, the label he would eventually sign with. His work caught the attention of producer Pheelz, who, after hearing "Sade", shared it with YBNL boss Olamide. He re-produced "Sade" in March 2015, for legal reasons. Impressed by the song's soulful and narrative-driven style, Olamide signed Adekunle Gold to YBNL in 2015.

== Composition ==
"Sade" is a folk-pop ballad that blends elements of highlife and pop. The song centers on themes of unrequited love and emotional vulnerability, delivered through lyrics in both Yoruba and Nigerian Pidgin. Its minimalist production features piano riffs and soft melodies, emphasizing Adekunle Gold's vocals and storytelling. The lines "Omoge dakun gbo temi, jowo ma je ki n lo commit o" and "Je'n gbe e lole, mummy mi reti omo" reflect the mix of personal emotion and cultural expression. The instrumental draws inspiration from One Direction's "Story of My Life," adapted to fit a Nigerian musical style. The track combines traditional influences with a contemporary sound, marking one of Adekunle Gold’s early explorations of his signature blend of folk and pop.

== Accolades ==
Awards and nominations for "Sade"
Organization	Year	Category	Result	Ref.
The Headies	2015	Best Alternative Song	Won	
All Africa Music Awards	2015	Revelation of the African Continent	Won	
tooXclusive Awards	2015	Best R&B Track	Won	
Nigerian Music Video Awards	2015	Best Soft Rock / Alternative Video	Won	
Nigerian Music Video Awards	2015	Best Video by a New Artiste	Nominated	

== Release history ==
Country	Date	Version	Format	Label
Various	19 December 2014	Standard	Digital download	Self-released
Various	5 March 2015	Re-release	Digital download	YBNL Nation
