= Oxygene (EP) =

EP by Oxlade
- Released: 27 March 2020
- Genres: Afro-fusion; R&B; alternative pop
- Length: 17:55
- Labels: Troniq Music; The Plug Entertainment
- Producers: Dera; Echo; Lussh; Nosa Apollo

Oxlade chronology
Everywhere (2019)	Oxygene (2020)	Eclipse (2021)

Singles from Oxygene
- 1. "Away" Released: March 20, 2020

Oxygene is the debut extended play by Nigerian singer-songwriter Oxlade. It was released on 27 March 2020, through Troniq Music, and The Plug Entertainment. The extended play featured guest appearance from Moelogo.

The EP combines elements from R&B, and Afropop with Neo-soul percussive rhythms. Oxygene received favorable reviews from critics, as Motolani Alake for Pulse Nigeria said "This review should have dropped two days ago, but I did not feel ready or convinced by my cynicism and idea that this EP was underwhelming. So, I deleted the first review I wrote. At the same time, I was scared that my favouritism towards the artist was clouding my judgement, so I wrote another review - a harsh one. Again, I deleted it."

On 29 August 2020, P.M. News included Oxygene on its list of the top six Nigerian albums/extended playlists this year.

== Background ==
Oxlade recorded Oxygene after series of collaborations and appearance on various events. On 19 March 2020, Oxlade announced the release of his six-track debut EP Oxygene. On 1 April 2020, Tush Magazine described the project as a nod to Oxlade's rich Afrobeat discography and his uncanny proficiency to meld it into a unique style of his own. Oxlade disclosed the project track listing wasn't even meant to be, on the 14th episode of The Donawon Podcast, he said "I mistakenly sent my management that link instead of the actual link. I sent them 40 songs. After I sent the Oxygene link, I deleted it but Bizzle had already started listening to it. He said it's the first link they're dropping. I cried. I wanted to run mad. I was so angry that day. Even the day I made Away, I didn't like it." The mixing and mastering was handled by Alpha Ojini, Spax, and Syn X.

== Composition ==
The EP opening track "O2" clears the air on Oxlade's vocal dexterity and the smoothness of his range, while delivering a love song that is as emotional as it is honest. In "Hold On", where he wears his heart on his sleeve and professes his full-hearted affection for his lover, against a catchy and danceable beat. In "Away", the project lead single boasts all of Oxlade’s trademark, and is the EP's centrepiece backed by an ethereal but groovy Spax-produced beat. At this point, it’s clear that Oxlade is here to get us in our feelings while making us want to turn up at the same time, a winning formula we’ve seen with popular artists from Wande Coal to Fireboy. In "Kokose" boasts of the first climax. Its Afrobeat-inspired instrumental is a vibe. It rolls off Oxlade's tongue with a smoothness that puts him in a class of his own. In "Weakness" struggles a bit until Oxlade finds the perfect point at the end of the song to infuse some magic. In "Tables Turn", Moelogo joined him for the emotive record, where they reminisce on their come up and how far they have come. The a dreamy ballad sees Oxlade reflecting about his humble beginnings in Mushin, dreaming about making songs with his idols, to actually shutting down shows overseas with them.

== Critical reception ==
Professional ratings
Review scores
Source	Rating
Pulse Nigeria	6.9/10

Oxygene received mixed reviews from music critics. In review for Radr Africa, YJTheRuler (aka Yinka) praised the project for often bring a temporal rush of excitement to the fans, but ended the review saying "Across the 6 songs on Oxygene, the production formula doesn’t stray too far off each other, but his eclectic harmonies & vocal dexterity makes each song a unique experience." In review for NotJustOk, Emmanuel Esomnofu described Oxygene as "more than just being a collection of six soul-baring songs", but also "the story of a musical prodigy up to this point, where everything changes. As it is a tipped hat to youth culture, and a demonstration of how talent, paired with strategy, is the prospect's best bet."

In Review for Pulse Nigeria, Motolani Alake said "More importantly, I think this EP proves that Oxlade can make music. What I initially thought was sonic myopia and a monotonous sound, it is actually sonic cohesion. I also like the track listing, it aids progression, segues and transition. The songwriting is not exactly groundbreaking - it is riddled with Nigerian pop culture cliche, but Oxlade sells it with his style and vocals. I can also tell that Oxlade has an imagination."

== Track listing ==
Oxygene track listing
No.	Title	Writer(s)	Producer(s)	Length
1.	"O2"	Ikuforiji Olaitan Abdulrahman	Spax; Nosa Apollo	2:59
2.	"Hold On"	Abdulrahman	Dera	2:31
3.	"Away"	Abdulrahman	Spax	2:44
4.	"Kokose"	Abdulrahman	Spax	2:23
5.	"Weakness"	Abdulrahman	Lussh	3:34
6.	"Tables Turn" (featuring Moelogo)	Abdulrahman; Mohammed Animashaun	Echo	3:44
Total length:				17:55

== Personnel ==
- Ikuforiji Olaitan Abdulrahman – vocals, writer
- Bizzle Osikoya - A&R executive
- Godfrey Eguakun – executive producer
- Spax – executive producer, production (track 1, 3, 4)
- Nosa Apollo – production (track 1)
- Dera – production (track 2)
- Lussh – production (tracks 5)
- Echo – production (tracks 6)

== Release history ==
Release history and formats for Oxygene
Region	Date	Format	Label
Various	27 March 2020	CD; digital download; streaming	Troniq Music; The Plug Entertainment
