= Simisola (album) =

Studio album by Simi
- Released: 8 September 2017
- Recorded: 2014–17
- Genres: Contemporary R&B; world; alt-rock; pop; Jùjú
- Length: 53:00
- Label: X3M
- Producers: Sess; Oscar; Vtek; SeyiKeyz

Simi chronology
Chemistry (2016)	Simisola (2017)	Omo Charlie Champagne, Vol. 1 (2019)

Singles from Simisola
- 1. "Tiff" Released: June 9, 2014; 2. "Jamb Question" Released: February 15, 2015; 3. "Love Don't Care" Released: February 14, 2016; 4. "Smile for Me" Released: January 27, 2017; 5. "Joromi" Released: August 11, 2017

Simisola is the second studio album by Nigerian singer Simi. It was released on September 8, 2017, by X3M Music. The album is the follow-up to her debut album, Ogaju (2008). Simisola received positive reviews from music critics, who praised the creativity and versatility of Simi's exploration of different sounds. The album was supported by five singles: "Tiff", "Jamb Question", "Love Don't Care", "Smile for Me" and "Joromi". Its production was handled by Sess, Seyi Keyz, Oscar and Vtek. Upon its release, the album debuted at number five on the Billboard World Albums chart for the week of September 30, 2017. Simisola won Album of the Year and was nominated for Best R&B/Pop Album at The Headies 2018. Moreover, it was nominated for Album of the Year the 2018 Nigeria Entertainment Awards.

== Promotion ==
Simi released the Oscar-produced love song "Smile for Me" on January 27, 2017. Its music video was directed by Clarence Peters. In anticipation of the album, she released another Oscar-produced love song called "Joromi". Its music video was directed by Aje Films. On September 1, she took to Instagram to unveil the album's cover art and track listing.

== Composition ==
Known for composing love ballads, the album sees Simi combining contemporary R&B with highlife and juju music. "Joromi" is inspired by Victor Uwaifo, while "Aimasiko" is a remake of Ebenezer Obey's "Aimasiko". Elements of Afrobeats, dancehall and techno can be found in "Original Baby", "Hip Hop Hurray" and "One Kain", respectively.

== Singles ==
"Tiff", "Jamb Question" and "Love Don't Care" all appeared as bonus tracks on the album. "Tiff" was nominated for Best RnB Video and Music Video of the Year at the 2015 Nigerian Music Video Awards. "Jamb Question" was also nominated for Best Soft Rock/Alternative Video at the aforementioned awards ceremony. "Love Don't Care" was released on February 14, 2016, in celebration of Valentine's Day; it was nominated in three categories at The Headies 2016, winning one.

== Critical reception ==
Professional ratings
Review scores
Source	Rating
The Star	4/5 stars
Pulse Nigeria	4/5 stars
TooXclusive	4.3/5 stars

Simisola received positive reviews from music critics, who were pleased with Simi's progress and versatility in exploring several music genres. Ifeoluwa Nihinlola of Music in Africa opined that Simi has progressed since her last album and thinks "she has found a way to retain the lightness of her voice and persona, while being earnest, all without turning bathetic". Filter Free's Chiagoziem Onyekwena stated: "On Simisola, Simi defines her own sense of everything." An editor for YNaija was full of praise for Simi's dynamism in fusing two Nigerian classics with contemporary R&B, and further added that the album is "a project that could go on to start a new Nigerian sound".

Vibe's Cyclone Artemis, who wrote a song by song review, pointed out that the "deep chemistry" between Oscar and Simi makes the album "in a class of its own by quite a number of standards". Reviewing for Pulse Nigeria, Joey Akan observed that Simi "delivered on her promise of good music" and went on to argue that "in many ways, it is the best that Nigeria has seen in 2017". Adeyemi Gbolahan of TalkGlitz Media added, "the album didn’t contain sounds like most Nigerian body of works that boasts of the ‘pon pon’ sounds." Describing the album as "quite predictable", Adeoluwa Atayero of Nigerian Entertainment Today wrote a mixed review. However, he remarked that Simisola is "one of the strongest musical pieces of 2017 and without a doubt a step in the right direction".

=== Accolades ===
Year	Awards ceremony	Award description(s)	Results
2018	Nigeria Entertainment Awards	Album of the Year	Nominated
2018	The Headies	Best R&B/Pop Album	Nominated
2018	The Headies	Album of the Year	Won

== Track listing ==
Credits adapted from the album's official liner notes.

Simisola – Standard edition
No.	Title	Writer(s)	Producer(s)	Length
1.	"Remind Me"	Simisola Ogunleye	Oscar	3:04
2.	"Joromi"	Ogunleye	Oscar	3:55
3.	"Aimasiko"	Ogunleye	SeyiKeyz	3:56
4.	"Complete Me"	Ogunleye	Oscar	3:18
5.	"Gone for Good"	Ogunleye	Oscar	3:59
6.	"Original Baby"	Ogunleye	Oscar	3:45
7.	"One Kain"	Ogunleye	Sess	3:07
8.	"Take Me Back" (featuring Adekunle Gold)	Ogunleye; Adekunle Kosoko	Oscar	4:08
9.	"O Wa N'bę"	Ogunleye	Vtek	3:30
10.	"Smile for Me"	Ogunleye	Oscar	3:33
11.	"Angelina"	Ogunleye	Oscar	3:26
12.	"HipHop Hurray"	Ogunleye	Oscar	3:34

Simisola – Bonus tracks
No.	Title	Writer(s)	Producer(s)	Length
13.	"Love Don't Care"	Ogunleye	Oscar	3:25
14.	"Jamb Question"	Ogunleye	Oscar	3:24
15.	"Tiff"	Ogunleye	Oscar	3:32
Total length:				53:00

Simisola – Deluxe edition
No.	Title	Writer(s)	Producer(s)	Length
16.	"Original Baby (Remix)" (featuring 2Baba)	Ogunleye; Innocent Idibia	Oscar	3:46
17.	"Smile for Me (Sigag Lauren Remix)"	Ogunleye	Sigag Lauren	3:37

== Personnel ==
- Simi – primary artist
- Adekunle Gold – featured artist (track 8)
- Fiokee – live guitars
- Alaba – live percussion
- Dami – live sax
- Ayo – live bass
- Obi Somto
- Simi - mixing
- Vtek – mastering
- Oscar – production (tracks 1, 2, 4, 5, 6, 8, 10, 11, 12, 13, 14, 15)
- SeyiKeyz - production (track 3)
- Sess - production (track 7)
- Vtek - production (track 9)

== Release history ==
Region	Date	Format	Version	Label
Various	September 8, 2017	CD, Digital download	Standard	X3M Music
