= Afro Pop Vol. 1 =

Studio album by Adekunle Gold
- Released: 21 August 2020
- Genres: Afrobeats; Afro pop; highlife
- Length: 29:00
- Label: EMI

Adekunle Gold chronology
About 30 (2018)	Afro Pop Vol. 1 (2020)	Catch Me If You Can (2022)

Singles from Afro Pop, Vol. 1
- 1. "Something Different" Released: 1 May 2020; 2. "AG Baby" Released: 17 July 2020

Afro Pop Vol. 1 is the third studio album by Nigerian singer and songwriter Adekunle Gold and was released on 21 August 2020 by EMI.

== Background ==
After the release of his sophomore album, About 30 (2018), Adekunle Gold felt the need for a sound-shift. In an interview with Pulse Nigeria, he clarified that the change isn't a deliberate rebrand but a natural progression of his artistry.

The lead single "Something Different" was released on 1 May 2020, and was produced by Blaisebeatz and co-written by Reekado Banks. The second single "AG Baby" features Trinidadian singer, Nailah Blackman and was released on 17 July 2020.

== Reception ==
In a review of Afro Pop Vol. 1 for Pulse Nigeria, Motolani Alake described the album as a "slow burn that will age like fine wine", praising the singer's ability to fuse Afro-pop with Western and electronic elements while maintaining African roots. Alake gave it a 7.6/10 rating, classifying it as a "Victory."

Adewojumi Aderemi of The Native praised the album's genre-blending sound, noting its "unexpected display of musical dexterity" and Gold's ability to appeal to both African and Western audiences without "sounding like a sell-out". The Lagos Review called the album "a jog rather than a sprint" and "easily the artist's finest album".

In Ifeoluwa Adeyemo's review for the Nigerian Entertainment Today, Gold was praised for his evolution into the "AG Baby" persona, fully embracing the pop star life in the album. Adeyemo appreciated that the album felt natural and unforced, referencing Adekunle's philosophy that "Ariwo Ko Ni Music" ("Noise isn't music").

=== Accolades ===
Afro Pop, Vol. 1 was nominated for Album of the Year at The Headies 2020.

== Track listing ==
Afro Pop Vol. 1 track listing
No.	Title	Length
1.	"AG Baby" (with Nailah Blackman)	2:38
2.	"Sabina"	3:08
3.	"Pretty Girl" (with Patoranking)	3:07
4.	"Okay"	3:06
5.	"Here for Ya"	2:57
6.	"Exclusive" (with Yinka)	2:55
7.	"Firewood" (with Tekno)	3:05
8.	"Something Different"	2:56
9.	"Water Carry Me"	2:57
10.	"My Ex"	2:56
Total length:		29:00
