= Away (Oxlade song) =

2020 single by Oxlade

"AWAY"

Single by Oxlade

from the EP Oxygene
- Released: March 20, 2020
- Recorded: 2020
- Genre: Afro-fusion
- Length: 2:44
- Label: Troniq Music; The Plug Entertainment; Epic
- Songwriter: Ikuforiji Olaitan Abdulrahman
- Producer: Spax

Oxlade singles chronology
"Sing" (2020)	"AWAY" (2020)	"Ojuju" (2021)

Music video
- "Away" on YouTube

"Away" is a song by Nigerian singer Oxlade, released as the only single from his first extended play Oxygene (2020). The song was produced by Nigerian record producer Spax. It was ranked at number 23 on Rolling Stone's list of 50 Best Songs of 2020, and TurnTable's Yearly Top 50 chart of 2020. As of August 2021, "Away" has received over 7.9 million streams on Spotify.

On 11 December 2020, OkayAfrica included the song in their list of 20 Best Nigerian Songs of 2020.

== Background ==
After having a minor breakthrough on Blaqbonez 2018 record "Mamiwota", he was approached by Bizzle Osikoya, who secured him a management and distribution deal with The Plug. He released "Away" on 20 March 2020, as the lead single off his EP Oxygene, through The Plug Entertainment. The record was produced by Spax. On 7 November 2020, Drake posted the song on his Instagram story, few minutes into the post, Asa Asika shared it on a tweet "Drake just posted Oxlade", and Nigerians reacted to the tweet.

== Music video and synopsis ==
On 13 April 2020, he released the official music video to "Away", shot and directed by TG Omori. According to Oxlade, T.G asked him to sit on his lady's lap to personify the popular saying, "behind every successful man is a woman". Tami Makinde of The Native stated, "Majority of the scenes in the video emphasises the importance of a woman in a man's life".

== Composition ==
"Away" was named to Rolling Stone's list of the 50 best songs in 2020. Elias Leight, who reviewed the song for the list, praised the lyrics' simplicity and the song's beat, and wrote that "Nigerian singer Oxlade allows just two indulgences — a pretty vocal arc before the repetitive rush of the chorus, plus a succinct guitar solo during the outro — and both are welcome."

== Commercial performance ==
During its debut week, "Away" peaked at number two on Apple Music in Nigeria. On 30 December 2020, it debuted at number twenty three on the TurnTable Yearly Top 50 chart. "Away" is Oxlade's most popular record with over 7.9 million Spotify streams as of August 2021. Rolling Stone included the song in their list of 50 Best Songs Of 2020.

== Charts ==
=== Year-end charts ===
Year-end chart performance for "Away"
Chart	Position
TurnTable Nigeria Top 50 (TurnTable)	23

== Release history ==
Release history and formats for "Away"
Region	Date	Format	Label	Ref.
Various	20 March 2020	Digital download; streaming	Troniq Music; Epic Records France; The Plug Entertainment	
