= Duduke =

2020 song by Simi

Single by Simi
- Released: April 16, 2020
- Recorded: 2019
- Genre: Afrobeats; Hip hop; R&B
- Length: 2:52
- Label: Studio Brat
- Songwriter: Simisola Ogunleye-Kosoko
- Producer: Oscar

Simi singles chronology
"Selense" (2019)	"Duduke" (2020)

Music video
- "Duduke" on YouTube

"Duduke" is a song by Nigerian singer Simi. It was released on April 16, 2020 and produced by Oscar.

== Background and composition ==
"Duduke" is a mid-tempo pop record blend with Afrobeats vibe and a take on R&B. Produced by Oscar, the song play on the sound the artist's heart makes when she thinks about her love interest. "Duduke", according to the artist means the beat of a heart or drum, and in the song, she uses a beat to describe her heartbeat for her unborn child whom she refers to as a guardian angel.

== Music video ==
An accompanying music video for "Duduke" was released on April 19, 2020 and was directed by Adasa Cookey. In the video shot by the beach, the artist showed her baby bump revealing that she is pregnant. The video which was released to coincide with Simi's birthday showed her playing a piano in front of the beach shoreline while also cradling her gravid belly in a silky and flowing yellow gown.

== Critical response ==
"Duduke" received positive reviews from music critics and consumers. An editor for Naijaloaded gave "Duduke" an 8/10 rating, noting that "this is soulful pop, the production, lyrical depth are all perfect". An editor for SoundStroke gave "Duduke" an 7.9/10 rating, stating that "Simi's amazing and unique vocals did a lot of justice to the record", while noting that "the production was also top-notch and everything, from the scenery to the production, feels perfect". Dami Ajayi from The Lagos Review opined that "Duduke" is a classic win for expectant mothers, while noting that Simi gifted women new ways to express the joy of forthcoming babies.

== Certifications ==
Region	Certification	Certified units/sales
Nigeria (RCN)	2× Platinum	10,000
