= Tiff (song) =

Single by Simi

from the album Simisola
- Released: 9 June 2014
- Genre: soul; Afro pop
- Length: 3:32
- Label: X3M
- Songwriter: Simisola Ogunleye
- Producer: Oscar Heman-Ackah

Simi singles chronology
"Marvin's Room" (2013)	"Tiff" (2014)	"E No Go Funny" (2014)

"Tiff" is a song by Nigerian singer-songwriter Simi. Produced by Oscar, the song is regarded as Simi's breakthrough into mainstream entertainment.

== Background ==
Tiff was released on 9 June 2014 as the first of two singles, with the later titled "E No Go Funny". The video for the song was directed by Josh Clarke and was uploaded to YouTube on 30 August 2014.

== Critical reception ==
Upon its release, "Tiff" was met with positive reviews amongst music critics. The song was nominated in the "Best Alternative Song" category at The Headies 2015.

== Awards and nominations ==
Year	Award ceremony	Prize	Result	Ref
2016	The Headies 2015	Best Alternative Song	Nominated	
