= Seyifunmi Michael =

Nigerian music director, producer, and entrepreneur

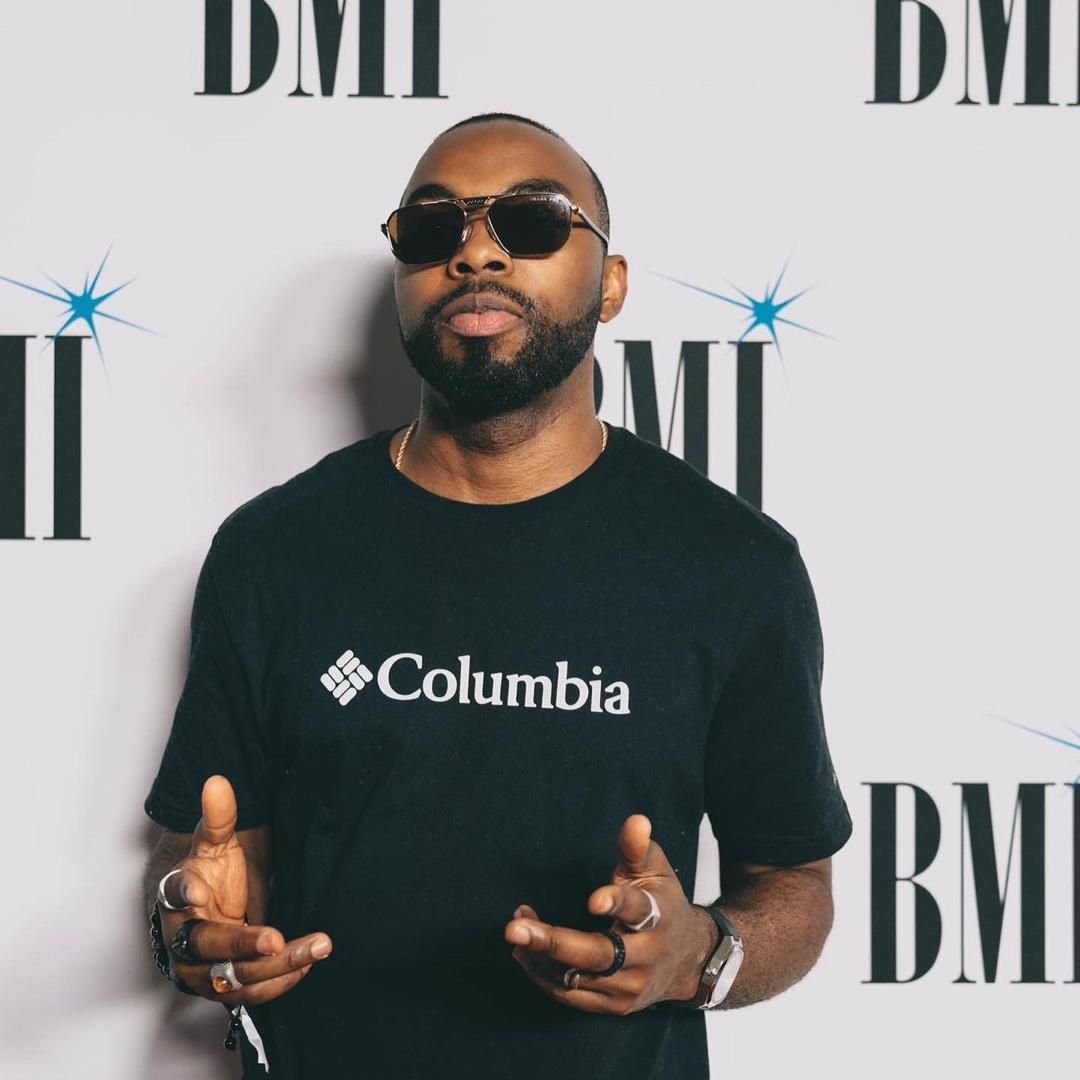
- Seyifunmi Michael, Nigerian music director and producer, at the BMI Awards 2024, Los Angeles
- Born: Bakare Michael; September 24, 1989 (age 37)
- Occupations: Music director, producer, entrepreneur
- Years active: 2015–present
- Known for: Uyo Meyo production, Three Kings Burger, live music arrangement
- Website: seyifunmimichael.com

Bakare Michael, professionally known as Seyifunmi or SeyiKeyz, is a Nigerian music director, producer, and entrepreneur. He is recognized for his work in live performance arrangement and production within Nigeria’s contemporary music scene, particularly in the Afrobeats genre. Seyifunmi is also the founder of the Lagos-based restaurant brand Three Kings Burger.

== Early life and education ==
Seyifunmi began his music journey in church choirs and youth bands, where he developed his skills in keyboard arrangement and live orchestration.

== Career in music ==
Seyifunmi began his professional career in 2015 as a producer under the YBNL Nation record label, contributing to Adekunle Gold’s debut album. His work helped shape the album’s sound, which blended highlife and Afropop influences.

He has since collaborated with several high-profile Nigerian artists, including Simi, Teni, and Davido.

Seyifunmi was the producer of Teni’s hit song Uyo Meyo, which won *Best Recording of the Year* at The Headies 2019.

As a music director, Seyifunmi is praised for enhancing the live music quality of performances by artists such as Adekunle Gold, who publicly acknowledged Seyifunmi’s contributions to his international tour arrangements.

== Entrepreneurial ventures ==
Beyond music, Seyifunmi is the founder of Three Kings Burger, a fast-food restaurant in Lagos, Nigeria. The restaurant initially launched as "Kings Burger" before undergoing a rebrand in 2023, with changes to its menu and branding strategy.

== Musical style and influence ==
Seyifunmi’s musical style is characterized by rich harmonic layering, live instrumentation, and an eclectic blend of highlife, soul, and modern Afrobeats. His live performance arrangements often feature full band setups and background vocals, enhancing the experience of Nigerian stage performances both locally and internationally.

== Selected works and performances ==
Year	Title / Project	Role	Artist(s) / Event	Notes
2015	*Gold* (Album)	Producer	Adekunle Gold	Debut studio album under YBNL
2018	"Uyo Meyo"	Producer	Teni	Won Best Recording at The Headies 2019
2021	AG Baby Live Tour	Music Director	Adekunle Gold	Directed international stage performances
