= Spax =

- Born: Akano Samuel; Minna, Niger State, Nigeria
- Origin: Ibadan, Oyo State, Nigeria
- Genres: Pop, Afropop
- Occupations: Record producer, songwriter
- Instruments: Flute; piano; drums; synthesizer
- Years active: 2010–present

Akano Samuel (born 26 July, known professionally as Spax) is a Nigerian record producer, Mixing Engineer and Arranger. Born in Niger State, Minna He is notable with the mainstream sound tag "Classic" and "if it's Spax then it gotta be" which is well known in the African mainstream music scene.

== Early life and career ==
Akano Samuel was born in Minna, Niger State, Nigeria, and grew up in Lagos. In 2020, he produced "Damages", the only single from Tems's first EP, For Broken Ears. On 27 March 2020, he executive produced Oxygene EP by Oxlade. In 2020, he was nominated for producer of the year at The Headies 2020. On 2 October 2021, he was among the Apple Music‘Oshe Naija’ campaign for Independence Day by Nigerian producers.

== Production discography ==
=== Executive producer ===
- Oxygene (EP) - Oxlade
- Serenade EP- Funbi
- Clone Wars 4 - Show dem camp

=== Album/EP ===
Title	Year	Albums/EPs	Ref(s)
"Up to You By Sdc feat. Funbi"	2017	Palmwine Music Vol 1	
"Popping Again By Sdc feat. Odunsi(the Engine) And Boj"	2017	Palmwine Music Vol 1	
"Independent Ladies by Sdc feat. Ajebutter22"	2017	Palmwine Music Vol 1	
"She wants More By Sdc feat. Ladipoe"	2017	Palmwine Music Vol 1	
"One Step Closer By Ladipoe Feat Funbi"	2018	T.A.P (Talk About Poe)	
"Falling By Ladipoe Feat Tems"	2018	T.A.P (Talk About Poe)	
"Revival By Ladipoe"	2018	T.A.P (Talk About Poe)	
"Red Light by Ladipoe feat. Seyi Shay"	2018	T.A.P (Talk About Poe)	
"Show up By Funbi"	2018	Serenade	
"Show your Color By Funbi"	2018	Serenade	
"Voodoo by Funbi"	2018	Serenade	
"Body By Funbi feat. Seyi Shay"	2018	Serenade	
"Ride With you By Funbi Efya"	2018	Serenade	
"I Want it Back By Funbi"	2018	Serenade	
"Kiss the Fire By the Collectiv3 feat. Tems"	2018	Live.Create.Repeat	
"Fulfill your Destiny By the Collectiv3 feat. Mokeyanju"	2018	Live.Create.Repeat	
"Stop Me by the Collectiv3"	2018	Live.Create.Repeat	
"24 by Ajebutter 22 & Boj"	2018	Make E No Cause Fight(EP)	
"Taxi by Ajebutter 22 & Boj"	2018	Make E No Cause Fight(EP)	
"Yawa By Ajebutter 22 & Boj"	2018	Make E No Cause Fight(EP)	
"Legend By Sdc Feat Burna Boy"	2018	Palmwine Music 2	
"System Fail By Sdc Feat Nonso Amadi"	2018	Palmwine Music 2	
"Tropicana By Sdc Feat Flash"	2018	Palmwine Music 2	
"Love On weekends By Sdc Feat Tomi Agape And Ladipoe"	2018	Palmwine Music 2	
"The Garden By Sdc Feat Falana"	2018	Palmwine Music 2	
"Ragabomi By Sdc Feat Moelogo"	2018	Palmwine Music 2	
"For a Minute By Sdc feat Lady Donli"	2018	Palmwine Music 2	
"Malibu And Palmwine by Sdc feat Worlasi"	2018	Palmwine Music 2	
"Tales By Moonlight by Sdc feat Tems"	2019	The Palmwine Express	
"Good Time Feat Funbi And Nonso Amadi"	2019	The Palmwine Express	
"Cool Me Down By Sdc Feat Fasina"	2019	The Palmwine Express	
"Do Me Nice By Sdc Feat Buju"	2019	The Palmwine Express	
"True Story by Sdc feat. Burna Boy"	2019	The Palmwine Express	
"Vibrations By Sdc feat. Tomi Thomas"	2019	The Palmwine Express	
"Too bad By Sdc feat. Amaarae & Tems"	2019	The Palmwine Express	
"Different Case By Sdc feat. Boj"	2019	The Palmwine Express	
"Savage by Sdc feat. Ladipoe"	2019	Clone Wars Vol. IV "These Buhari Times"	
"Duade By Sdc Cina Soul"	2019	Clone Wars Vol. IV "These Buhari Times"	
"In the Vibe We trust By Sdc"	2019	Clone Wars Vol. IV "These Buhari Times"	
"Hunger Cries By Sdc"	2019	Clone Wars Vol. IV "These Buhari Times"	
"Everything I love By Sdc"	2019	Clone Wars Vol. IV "These Buhari Times"	
"No White Flags by Sdc feat. Rotex and Phlow"	2019	Clone Wars Vol. IV "These Buhari Times"	
"Tipping Point By Sdc feat. Boogey"	2019	Clone Wars Vol. IV "These Buhari Times"	
"4th Republic By Sdc feat. Dap The Contract & Vector"	2019	Clone Wars Vol. IV "These Buhari Times"	
"+234 By Sdc"	2019	Clone Wars Vol. IV "These Buhari Times"	
"Packaging By Sdc"	2019	Clone Wars Vol. IV "These Buhari Times"	
"Shadow of Doubt By Sdc Feat Tems"	2019	Clone Wars Vol. IV "These Buhari Times"	
"Respect, Loyalty & Honour By Sdc feat. M.I Abaga"	2019	Clone Wars Vol. IV "These Buhari Times"	
”Craze by Afro Nation, Reekado Banks, Oxlade”	2019	”’’’AFRO NATION VOL.1’’’”	
"02 By Oxlade"	2020	Oxygene	
"AWAY by Oxlade"	2020	Oxygene	
"Kokose by Oxlade"	2020	Oxygene	
"Tables Turn by Oxlade feat. Moelogo"	2020	Oxygene	
"Damages By Tems"	2020	For Broken Ears	
"My Ex By Adekunle Gold"	2020	Afro pop Vol 1	
"Tumbo by Tekno"	2020	Old Romance	
"Family Issues By Tekno"	2020	Old Romance	
"In Love By Tekno"	2020	Old Romance	
"Love Me JeJe" by Tems	2024		

=== Singles ===
Title	Year	Artiste(s)	Ref(s)
"Shugar”	2018	Oxlade	
"Labalaba"	2018	Tiwa Savage	
"Causing trouble”	2019	DJ Tunez feat. Oxlade	
"Majesty"	2019	DJ Tunez feat. Busiswa	
"BBC”	2020	Blaqbonez	
"Puttin”	2020	Tekno	
"Ghost town"	2020	Wurld	
"DKT”	2020	Oxlade	
"Beautiful”	2020	Tomi Owo	
”Gbese 2.0”	2020	DJ Tunez feat. Wizkid & Spax	
”Sudden”	2020	Tekno	

== Awards and nominations ==
Year	Event	Prize	Recipient	Result	Ref(s)
2020	The Headies 2020	Producer Of The Year	”Himself”	Nominated	
2021	The Beatz Awards	Producer Of The Year	”Himself”	Nominated	
2021	The Beatz Awards	Afro R&B Producer Of The Year	”Himself”	Nominated	
2021	The Beatz Awards	Afro Hip-Hop Producer Of The Year	”Himself”	Nominated	
