= Adekunle Gold =

Nigerian musician (born 1987)

- Also known as: AG Baby
- Born: Adekunle Almoruf Kosoko; 28 January 1987 (age 39); Lagos State, Nigeria
- Genres: Afrobeats; world
- Occupations: Singer; songwriter
- Years active: 2010–present
- Labels: Afro Urban Inc; YBNL Nation (former); Def Jam Recordings (former)
- Spouse: Simi (m. 2019)
- Website: adekunlegold.com

Adekunle Almoruf Kosoko (born 28 January 1987), known professionally as Adekunle Gold, is a Nigerian singer and songwriter. He gained widespread attention after releasing the 2015 hit single "Sade", a highlife cover of One Direction's "Story of My Life". He signed a record deal with YBNL Nation and released his 2015 debut studio album Gold, which debuted at number 7 on the Billboard World Albums chart. Gold was preceded by the release of three singles: "Sade", "Orente" and "Pick Up". Adekunle Gold revealed to Nigerian Entertainment Today that prior to signing with YBNL, he designed the label's official logo and completed other designs for Lil Kesh, Viktoh and Olamide. In 2023, he released Tequila Ever After, his fifth studio album and first under Def Jam. He released his sixth studio album, Fuji, on 3 October 2025. The 15 track album title is an acronym for Finding Uncharted Journeys Inside.

== Education ==
He holds a Higher National Diploma in Arts and Design from Lagos State Polytechnic.

== Career ==
=== 2010–2014: Career beginnings ===
While growing up, Adekunle developed interest in music while listening to songs by King Sunny Ade and Ebenezer Obey. He became a member of his church's junior choir during his teenage years and went on to write his first song at the age of 15. In 2014, Adekunle went solo after disbanding from a music group he formed with a friend while in school. He was dubbed the "King of Photoshop" after posting an edited photoshop image of him hugging Tiwa Savage on social media platforms. On 19 December 2014, he released "Sade", a cover of One Direction's "Story of My Life". The song rose to critical acclaim and was nominated for Best Alternative Song at The Headies 2015.

=== 2015–present: Gold ===
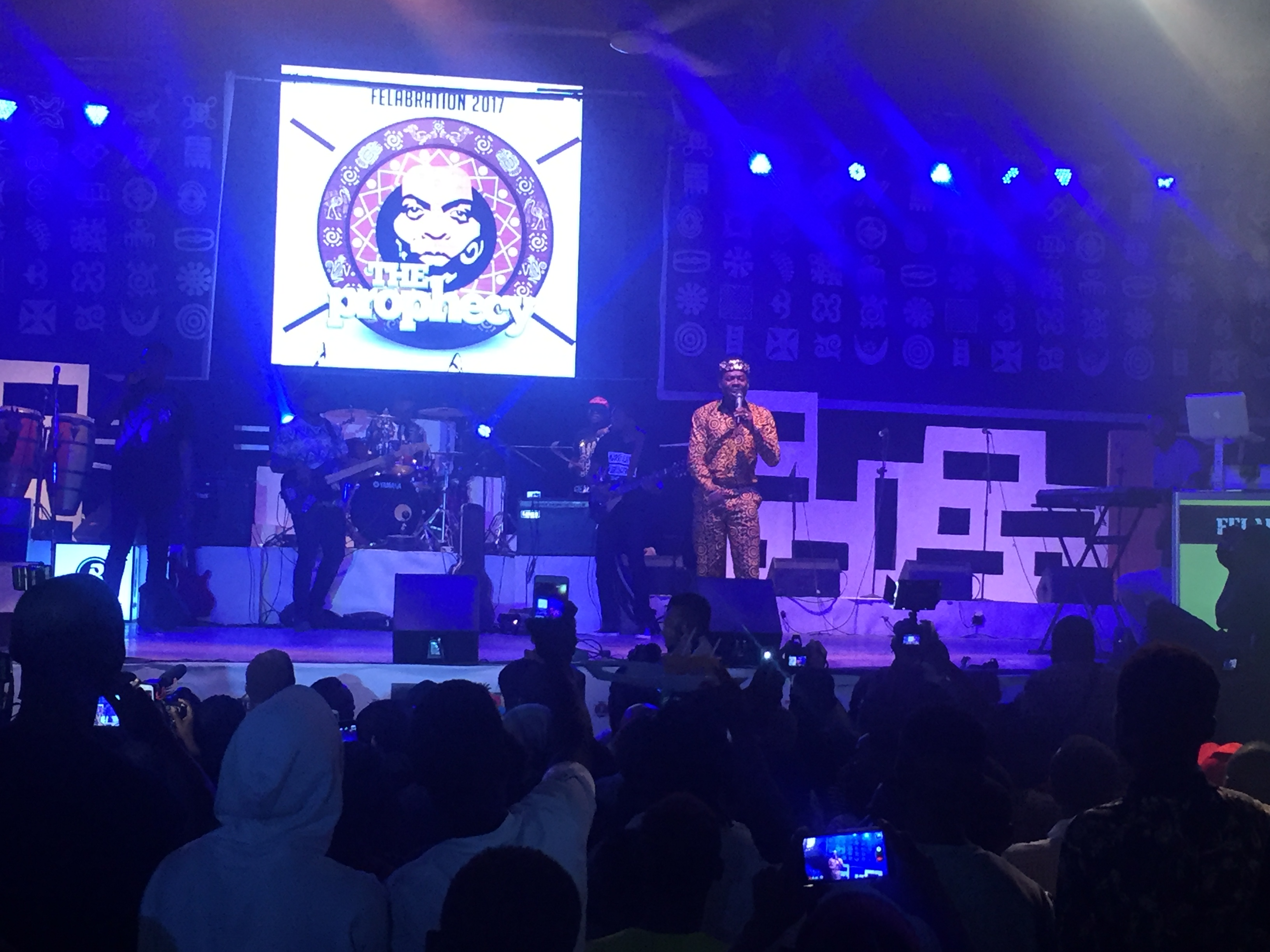
Adekunle Gold Performing at Felabration in 2017, UzomediaTV

After the release of "Sade", Adekunle released his first official single titled "Orente" through YBNL Nation after signing a music contract with the record label on 5 March 2015. He was nominated in the Most Promising Act of the Year category at the 2015 City People Entertainment Awards. On 18 July 2016, Adekunle Gold revealed the cover and track list of his debut studio album titled Gold. The album is a 16-track project, with musical production from Pheelz, Masterkraft, B Banks, Sleekamo, Oscar and Seyikeyz. It was released on 25 July, three days before the original scheduled date of release. Upon its release, it peaked at No. 7 on the Billboard World Album Chart for the week of 13 August 2016. Moreover, it was critically reviewed by contemporary music critics. Following his departure from YBNL Nation due to the expiry of his contract, Adekunle Gold unveiled his band "The 79th Element" in reference to the atomic number of gold. On 15 January 2018, Unity Bank unveiled Adekunle Gold as their brand ambassador. Adekunle Gold released his highly anticipated album Afro Pop Vol. 1 on 21 August 2020.

On 4 February 2022, he released his fourth studio album Catch Me If You Can with production credits from Seyifunmi, Davayo, Rymez, Lekka, TMXO, Tay Iwar, Blaise Beatz, Kali, Que Beats, and Spax.

In March 2023, Adekunle Gold was signed to Def Jam Recordings. In a statement with Billboard, the CEO of Def Jam Recordings, Tunji Balogun announced that Adekunle Gold was signed to Def Jam.

In September 2025, New York University announced a collaboration with Adekunle Gold focused on sickle cell disease and mental health awareness.

== Personal life ==
Adekunle married Simi in January 2019. They had been dating for five years. They had a daughter named Deja in May 2020.

On 15 July 2022, he revealed his lifelong battle with sickle cell disease, and that it inspired his song titled "5 Star". He has since dedicated himself to advocating for the disease via his foundation, 'Adekunle Gold Foundation'

Adekunle is a supporter of Manchester United F.C.

== Discography ==
=== Studio albums ===
- Gold (2016)
- About 30 (2018)
- Afro Pop, Vol. 1 (2020)
- Catch Me If You Can (2022)
- Tequila Ever After (2023)
- Fuji (2025)

== Awards and nominations ==
| Year | Award ceremony | Prize | Recipient/Nominated work | Result | Ref |
|---|---|---|---|---|---|
| 2015 | Nigeria Entertainment Awards | Best New Act | "Himself" | Won | |
| 2016 | Nigeria Entertainment Awards | Best Song | Pick Up | Won | |
| 2016 | Nigeria Entertainment Awards | Best New Act to Watch | Himself | Won | |
| 2016 | The Headies | Best Alternative Song | "Sade" | Won | |
| 2017 | City People Entertainment Awards | Album of the Year | "Himself" | Won | |
| 2017 | City People Entertainment Awards | Collabo of the Year | "Himself and Simi" | Won | |
| 2017 | IARA | Best African Music Artist | "Himself" | Won | |
| 2021 | Net Honours | Most Popular Musician | "Himself" | Nominated | |
| 2021 | Net Honours | Most Played RnB Song | "Pami" (DJ Tunez featuring Wizkid Adekunle Gold & Omah Lay) | Nominated | |
| 2023 | The Headies | Songwriter of the Year | Himself for (Simi – "Loyal") | Won | |
| 2024 | TurnTable Music Awards | Outstanding Achievement in Music in Film | Himself for "Book of Clarence" and "Christmas in Lagos" | Won | |

== See also ==
- List of Nigerian musicians
- YBNL Nation
- Simi
- Olamide
