= Simi (singer) =

Nigerian singer (born 1988)

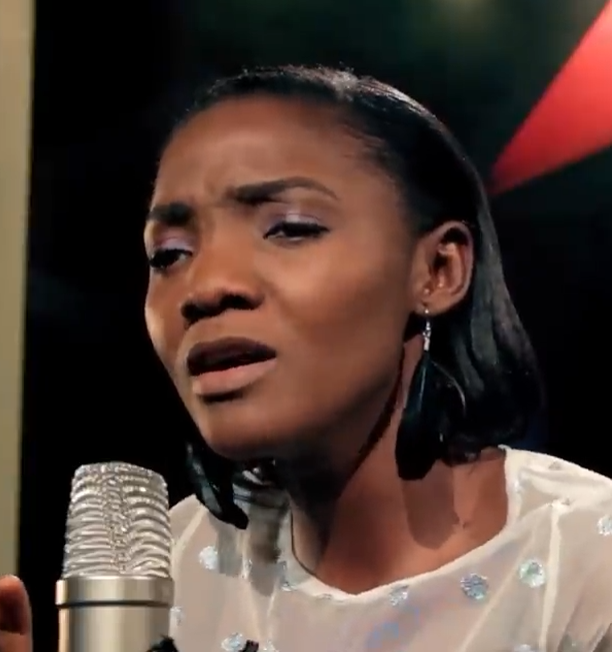
- Simi performing "Tiff" for Ndani Sessions in April 2015
- Born: Simisola Bolatito Ogunleye; 19 April 1988 (age 38); Ojuelegba, Lagos, Nigeria
- Education: Covenant University
- Occupations: Singer; songwriter; record producer; sound engineer; actress
- Spouse: Adekunle Gold (m. 2019)
- Children: 2
- Awards: Full list
- Musical career
- Genres: Afropop; soul; alt-rock; world; R&B
- Instrument: Vocals
- Years active: 2006–present
- Labels: Studio Brat; X3M (former)
- Website: iamsimi.com

Simisola Bolatito Kosoko (née Ogunleye; born April 19, 1988), better known as Simi, is a Nigerian singer, songwriter, and actress. She began her career as a gospel singer and released her debut studio album, Ogaju, in 2008. Simi gained public recognition in 2014 after releasing "Tiff", a song that was nominated for Best Alternative Song at The Headies 2015. She signed a record deal with X3M Music in 2014, but left the label in May 2019 following the expiration of her contract. She released her second studio album, Simisola, on September 8, 2017. Her third studio album, Omo Charlie Champagne, Vol. 1, was released to coincide with her thirty-first birthday on April 19, 2019. Simi launched her record label Studio Brat in June 2019. She was a judge on season 7 of Nigerian Idol in 2022.

== Life and career ==
=== Early life and education ===
Simi was born on 19 April 1988 in Ojuelegba, a suburb of Surulere, Lagos State, as the last of four children. In an interview with Juliet Ebirim of Vanguard newspaper, Simi revealed that her parents separated when she was 9 years old. She also revealed that she grew up as a tomboy. Simi attended Stars International College, a secondary school in Ikorodu, Lagos State. She is an alumna of Covenant University, where she studied mass communication.

=== 2006–2018: Career beginnings, Ogaju, Restless, Chemistry, and Simisola ===
Simi grew up dancing and singing as a member of her local church's choir. She wrote her first song at age 10. Her professional music career started in 2008 following the release of her debut studio album Ogaju, which consisted of a variety of songs such as "Iya Temi" and "Ara Ile". The album was produced entirely by Samklef.

In January 2014, Simi released the 5 track EP Restless, which eventually earned her a record deal with X3M Music. The EP is composed mostly of popular covers, including "Man Down" and "Set Fire to the Rain". On January 9, 2014, Simi released the singles "Tiff" and "E No Go Funny". Both songs received frequent airplay and were met with generally positive reviews from critics. The video for "Tiff" was directed by Josh Clarke and released on August 30, 2015. The song was nominated for Best Alternative Song at the 2015 edition of The Headies. Later in 2015, Simi won the Most Promising Act to Watch category at the 2015 Nigeria Entertainment Awards. In an interview with Leadership newspaper, Simi revealed that she started working on her second studio album, which was slated for release in 2016. Upon releasing "Jamb Question", Simi was listed as one of the artistes to watch out for in 2016 by NotJustOk. The remix of "Jamb Question" features Nigerian rapper Falz.

On February 14, 2016, Simi released the Oscar Heman Ackah-produced love ballad "Love Don't Care". It received frequent radio airplay and was met with positive reviews. "Love Don't Care" effectively addresses tribalism and discrimination in Nigeria. The song's music video was directed by Clarence Peters. In October 2016, Simi was nominated for Best Breakthrough Act at the MTV Africa Music Awards. On October 27, Simi collaborated with Falz to release the extended play Chemistry. Oghene Michael of 360 Nobs described the EP as an "experiment of the word art". In December 2016, Simi was nominated in three categories at The Headies 2016, winning one. In anticipation of her 12-track second studio album Simisola, Simi released two singles; "Smile for Me" and "Joromi". Both songs were accompanied by music videos directed by Clarence Peters and Aje Films, respectively. Music videos for "O Wa Nbe", "Complete Me", "Gone for Good" and "Aimasiko" were also released to further promote the album. Simi unveiled the album's track list on September 1, 2017. Simisola was released seven days later and debuted at number 5 on the Billboard World Albums chart.

=== 2019–2020: Omo Charlie Champagne, Vol. 1, Studio Brat, and Restless II ===
In March 2019, Simi disclosed that she would be releasing her third studio album, Omo Charlie Champagne, Vol. 1, to coincide with her birthday on April 19, 2019. She disclosed this information in a series of social media messages. The album is a slight departure from the relatively afro-centric feel of Simisola, and a mixture of sentimental ballad, Afropop, Afro-fusion, Afro-soul, R&B, EDM and moombahton. Omo Charlie Champagne, Vol. 1 features collaborations with guest acts such as Patoranking, Maleek Berry, Falz, and her husband Adekunle Gold. The album's production was primarily handled by Oscar, with additional production from Vtek, Legendury Beatz, and Sess. Simi dedicated Omo Charlie Champagne, Vol. 1 to her father Charles Oladele Ogunleye, who died in 2014. The album was supported by three singles: "I Dun Care", "Lovin", and "Ayo".

In May 2019, X3M Music announced Simi's departure following the expiration of her recording contract. Both parties did not renew the contract and agreed to part ways. In June 2019, Simi announced the launch of her independent record label, Studio Brat. In 2020, she released the single "Duduke", which depicts her then-unborn child as a symbol of love and hope. Simi's fourth studio album, To Be Honest, reflect a more personal and introspective approach to her music. Independence has significantly shaped Simi's career, enabling her to experiment with new sounds while staying true to her roots. In 2020, Simi released the Extended Play (EP) Restless II, which is a continuation of the EP Restless (2014).

=== 2021–present: To Be Honest and Lost and Found ===
Simi's fourth studio album, To Be Honest, was released in 2022. It houses 11 tracks and features guest acts such as Fave, Deja, and her husband Adekunle Gold. Simi embarked on the To Be Honest tour, which took her to various international venues in the U.S and UK. The tour marked a significant moment in her career, showcasing her expanding global reach and connecting with her international fanbase. Her achievement on this studio project stretched to her selection as Spotify EQUAL Africa music program ambassador for July. She became the second African artiste after Tiwa Savage to be named an EQUAL global and EQUAL African artist.

In an interview with African Folder, Simi disclosed that she was working on her fifth studio album, Lost and Found. Her favourite thing about the album is that she had the freedom to make music the way she enjoyed it. On July 5, 2024, Simi released Lost and Found, which was supported by the singles "Men Are Crazy" and "All I Want". The album is a reflective body of work that explores themes of self-discovery, love, and societal issues.

== Artistry ==
Apart from being a singer and songwriter, Simi is also a sound engineer. She is credited with mixing and mastering Adekunle Gold's debut studio album Gold, which was released in July 2016. Her music style is basically hinged in the rhythm and blues, soul and hip hop music genres.

== Controversy ==
In February 2026, a Tiktok user named Mirabel alleged that she had been raped in her home. While reacting to the story, Simi called on men to hold other men accountable and spoke out against rape culture in Nigeria. Mirabel later acknowledged that her accusation was untrue. Critics reacted negatively to Simi's remarks, accusing her of ignoring the prevalence of false rape allegations. Amid the backlash, social media users uncovered some inappropriate tweets Simi posted between 2012 and 2015 while working at her mother's day care. In some of the resurfaced tweets, Simi revealed her obsession with kissing young children and fawned over a four-year-old boy's genitalia. On 27 February, the National Agency for the Prohibition of Trafficking in Persons (NAPTIP) launched an investigation into the matter and urged victims to come forward. Simi said she has never acted immorally and that her tweets were miscontrue and taken out of context. The singer's PR team removed some of her old tweets.

== Personal life ==
Simi married singer Adekunle Gold in a private wedding ceremony on January 9, 2019. It was later revealed that they had been dating for five years. Simi gave birth to her daughter Adejare on 30 May 2020. In April 2026, Simi and her husband welcomed their second child, a boy.

== Filmography ==
Simi made her acting debut in Kunle Afolayan's film Mokalik, which was released in 2019.

== Discography ==
Studio albums

- Ogaju (2008)
- Simisola (2017)
- Omo Charlie Champagne, Vol. 1 (2019)
- To Be Honest (2022)
- Lost and Found (2024)

EPs

- Restless (2014)
- Chemistry (with Falz) (2016)
- Restless II (2020)

== Academic writings about Simi ==
- Adebayo, Abidemi Olufemi. "Culture Shift and Simisola Ogunleye's (Simi's) Conception of the Millennial African Woman in Love Don't Care and Joromi." Ibadan Journal of English Studies 7 (2018): 173–184.

== See also ==
- List of awards and nominations received by Simi
- List of Nigerian musicians
