= The Beatz Awards 2017 =

Annual Nigerian music awards ceremony

- Date: 16 December 2017
- Location: Shell Hall, Muson Center, Onikan, Victoria Island
- Hosted by: Seyi Law; Angel Ufuoma

Television/radio coverage
- Network: Silverbird Television; Nigezie TV; wapTV; Television Continental; BEN Television; 98.9 Kiss FM Lagos; Rhythm 93.7 FM Lagos
- Produced by: Eliworld Int'l Limited

The 3rd The Beatz Awards was held at Muson Center in Lagos on 16 December 2017. On 1 September the organizers call for entries, to be submitted through its portal, from the year in review 3 August 2016 to 30 September 2017. Nominees were revealed on 26 October 2017. The live show was televised on STV, Nigezie TV, wapTV, TVC, and BEN Television.

The third edition was hosted by Seyi Law, and Angel Ufuoma.

== Performers ==
=== Presenters ===
- Seyi Law
- Angel Ufuoma

== Nominations and winners ==
The following is a list of nominees and the winners are listed highlighted in boldface.

Best Producer	New Discovery Producer
**Cobhams Asuquo** – (Tjan - "Your Smile"); Sarz – (Wizkid - "Come Closer"); Masterkraft – (Tekno - "Yawa"); Altims – (Korede Bello - "Do Like That"); Del B - (Runtown - "Mad Over You")	**Killertunes** – (Kiss Daniel - "Sofa"); DJ Mostephens – *(Skuki - "Pass The Agbara"); Benjamz – (Phyno - "Pino Pino"); Dapiano – (2Baba - "Gaga Shuffle"); Adey – (Ycee - "Juice")
Best Afro Pop Producer	Best Afrobeat Producer
**Tekno** – (Davido - "If"); Sarz – (Tekno - "Be"); Masterkraft – (Tekno - "Yawa"); DJ Altims – (Korede Bello - "Do Like That"); Spellz – (Wande Coal - "Iskaba")	**Selebobo** – (Tekno – "Rara"); Sarz – (Starboy - "Ghetto Youth"); Kiddominant – (Mayorkun - "Mama"); DJ Altims – (D'Prince - "So Nice"); DJ Coublon – (Seyi Shay - "Yolo Yolo")
Best Afro R&B Producer	Best Afro Hip Hop Producer
**DJ Altims** – (Iyanya - "Not Forgotten"); Cobhams Asuquo – (Banky W. - "Love U Baby"); Praiz – (Praiz - "69"); Masterkraft – (Banky W. - "Blessing Me"); Sizzlepro – (Waje - "Mountain")	**Sarz** – (Wizkid - "Come Closer"); Jay Pizzle – (CDQ - "Say Baba"); Young Jonn – (Olamide - "Update"); Masterkraft – (Vector - "Gee Boys"); DJ Altims – (Poe - "Man Already")
Best Afro Highlife Producer	Best Afro Rock Producer
**Seyi Keys** – (Adekunle Gold - "My Life"); Del B – (Del B - "Comsa"); DJ Altims – (Reekado Banks - "Ladies And Gentleman"); Mystro – (Teni - "Fargin")	**Johnny Drille** – (Johnny Drille – "Romeo And Julie"); Coldflames – (Clay - "Cheap Happiness"); Mr. Shabz – (Snatcha - "Let God Be True"; Cliff.M – (Eben) - "Lift The Name"
Best Afro Soul Producer	Best Afro Dancehall Producer
**Cobhams Asuquo** – (Cobhams Asuquo – "Empty"); Oscar Heman-Ackah - (Simi - Joromi); Yellowfella – (Sylvia Charles - "Ima Mi"); George Nathaniel - (Ranti - "Heartbeat"); Sizzlepro – (Aramide - "Bose")	**Dr. Amir** – (Harrysong - "Samankwe"); DJ Altims – (Reekado Banks - "Move"); Krizbeatz – (Skales - "Booty Language"); Tony Ross – (Cynthia Morgan - "Bubble Up"); Orbeat – (Timaya - "Dance")
Best Afro Jazz Producer	Best Afro Gospel Producer
**Cobhams Asuquo** – (Omawumi - "I No Sure"); Wole Oni – (Adeh Gbolahan - "You And I"); Fliptyce – Etuk Ubong - "Battle For Peace"); Philip Uzo – (Debbie Soul - "Ileke"); Yemi Sax – (Yemi Sax - "If")	**Smj** – (Tim Godfrey - "So Good"); Olaitan – (Pat Uwaje-King - "Thank You Lord"); Mr T – (Samsong - "Awesome Wonder"); K-Solo – (Mike Abdul - "Maverlous"); Nathaniel Bassey & Emmanuel Uzozie – (Nathaniel Bassey - "Onise Iyanu")
Best DJ Male	Best DJ Female
**DJ Spinall**; DJ Xclusive; DJ Big N; DJ Obi; Dj Consequence	**DJ Cuppy**; DJ Nana; DJ Lambo; DJ Switch; DJ Tgarbs
Best Radio Station	Best Entertainment Station (Terrestrial)
**Soundcity 98.5FM Lagos**; The Beat 99.9 FM; Cool FM 96.9 - Lagos; Rhythm 93.7 FM Lagos; Wazobia FM 95.1 Lagos; Inspiration Fm 92.3; Kiss Fm Lagos 98.9	**Silverbird Television**; Television Continental; Galaxy Television; Wazobia Max; ONTV Nigeria
Best Entertainment Station (Cable)	Best Artist Manager
**Soundcity TV**; HipTV; Nigezie TV; Trace Naija TV; MTV base West Africa	**Sunday Are** - Wizkid; **Taiye Aliu** – Yemi Alade; Ubi Franklin - Tekno, Selebobo; Asa Asika – Davido; Osagie Osarenkhoe – Timaya
Best Music Video Director	Best Live Band
**Clarence Peters** – Holy Holy; Aje Filmworks – Joromi; Adasa Cookey – Samankwe; Unlimited L.A – Gaga Shuffle; Mex – Maradona	**Shuga Band**; Sharp Band; Eboni Band; Veentage Band; Adrenaline Band
Best Songwriters	Best OAP
**Simi** – (Simi - "Smile For Me"); Timi Dakolo – (Timi Dakolo – "Medicine"); Kiddominant – (Mayorkun - "Mama"); Cobhams Asuquo – (Cobhams Asuquo - "Empty"); Johnny Drille – (Johnny Drille - "Romeo & Juliet")	**Moet Abebe** – Soundcity Radio; Do2tun – Cool Fm; Yaw – Wazobia Fm; Osi Suave – The Beat Fm; Jaj (Jacob Akinyemi Johnson) – Rhythm Fm; Big Daddy Juxi – Kiss Fm Lagos; Valentine Ohu – Inspiration Fm
Best Record Company (Marketer)	Best Record Label
**Uba Pacific**	**Mavin Records**; Starboy Entertainment; X3M Music; Davido Music Worldwide; Made Men Music Group
Best Blog	Best Online Music Platform
**BellaNaija**; Linda Ikeji Blog; OloriSuperGal; YNaija; 360 Nobs	**tooXclusive**; 360nobs; NotJustOk; Jaguda.com; NaijaLoaded
Best Mixing & Mastering Engineer	Best Choreographer
**Olaitan Dada** – (Yemi Alade - "Charliee"); Swaps – (Yemi Alade - "Knack Am"); Edward Sunday – (Tim Godfrey - "So Good"); Captain E – (Del B - "Comsa"); Mixxmonsta – (Davido - "If")	**Kaffy**; Lovette; Don Flex; GGB Dance Crew; Alien Nation

== Special Recognition Awards ==
At the ceremony, the organizers honored:

Award description(s)	Recipient
Outstanding Contributions in the Nigeria Entertainment Industry	MTN Nigeria
Industry Professional of the Year	"Obi Asika"
