= The Beatz Awards 2018 =

Annual Nigerian music awards ceremony

- Date: 21 November 2018
- Location: Shell Hall, Muson Center, Onikan, Victoria Island
- Hosted by: Kenny Blaq

Television/radio coverage
- Network: Silverbird Television; Nigezie TV; wapTV; Television Continental; BEN Television; 98.9 Kiss FM Lagos; Rhythm 93.7 FM Lagos
- Produced by: Eliworld Int'l Limited

The 4th The Beatz Awards tagged "The Quadrant", was held at Muson Center in Lagos on 21 November 2018. Nominees were revealed on 26 October 2017. The live show was televised on STV, Nigezie TV, wapTV, TVC, and BEN Television, and hosted by Kenny Blaq. Killertunes had the highest award winnings at The Beatz Awards, by securing 3 awards at the ceremony.

== Performers ==
=== Presenters ===
- Kenny Blaq

== Nominations and winners ==
The following is a list of nominees and the winners are listed highlighted in boldface.

| Best Producer | New Discovery Producer |
|---|---|
| **Killertunes** – (DJ Spinall - "Baba"); Spellz – (Tiwa Savage - "Lova Lova"); Fresh VDM – (Davido - "Fia"); SeyiKeyz – (Adekunle Gold - "Ire"); Johnny Drille – (Johnny Drille - "Halleluya") | **Northboi** – (Wizkid - "Soco"); Dunnie - (Sean Tizzle - "Pempe"); Fresh VDM – (Davido - "Fia"); Speroach Beatzz - (Davido – "Assurance"); Micon Beatz - (Timaya – "Ah Blem Blem"); Lord Sky – (Rudeboy - "Nkenji Keke"); Phantom – (Burna Boy - "Ye") |
| Best Afro Pop Producer | Best Afrobeat Producer |
| **Spellz** – (Tiwa Savage - "Ma Lo"); Killertunes – (Duncan Mighty - "Fake Love"); Mystro – (Mystro - "Immediately"); Speroach Beatz – (2Baba - "Amaka"); Fresh VDM – (Davido - "Fia"); Kealz Beat – (Mr. P - "Ebeano"); Tee-Y Mix – (Mayorkun - "Bobo"); DJ Coublon – (Yemi Alade - "Oh My Gosh") | **Killertunes** - (DJ Spinall - "Nowo"); Dunnie - (Sean Tizzle – "Pempe"); Northboi – (Wizkid - "Soco"); Johnny Drille – (Omawumi - "Me Ke"); Oscar Heman-Ackah – (Simi - "I Dun Care"); Phantom – (Burna Boy - "Ye"); SeyiKeyz – (Adekunle Gold - "Mr Foolish") |
| Best Afro R&B Producer | Best Afro Hip Hop Producer |
| **LeriQ** - (LeriQ - "Will You Be Mine"); Lord Sky – Nkenjikeke by Rudeboy; Kel-P – (Ceeza Milli - "Yapa"); Young Wills – (Praiz - "Champagne and Flowers"); Fresh VDM – (Peruzzi - "Mata") | **Demsa** – (Falz - "La Fete"); Quebeat – Ponmile by Reminics; Cliff Egde – Gbayi by Cdq Ft Kizz Daniel; PBanks & Young John – (Olamide - "Science Student"); Young John – (Efe - "Warri") |
| Best Afro Highlife Producer | Best Afro Rock Producer |
| **Killertunes** – (Kizz Daniel - "Yeba"); SeyiKeyz – (Simi - "Aimasiko"); Don Jazzy – (DJ Big N - "My Dear"); Fresh VDM – (Davido - "Flora My Flawa"); Sizzle Pro – (Aramide - "Fall On Them"); Skelly – (Zoro - "Stainless") | **Johnny Drille** - (Johnny Drille – "Awa Love"); Clay – (Clay - "The One"); Folabi Nuel – (Folabi Nuel - "My Heart"); Zainab Sule – (Zainab Sule - "I Believe In Love") |
| Best Afro Soul Producer | Best Afro Dancehall Producer |
| **Johnny Drille** – (Johnny Drille - "Halleluya"); SeyiKeyz – (Adekunle Gold - "Ire"); Oscar – (Simi - "Remind Me"); Sizzle Pro – (Aramide - "Jowo") | **Micon Beatz** – (Timaya - "Ah Blem Blem"); Rudeboy – (Rudeboy - "Fire Fire"); Tekno – (Tekno - "Jogodo"); Chopstix – (Burna Boy - "Gba"); Vtekawesome – (Yemi Alade - "Bum Bum"); Praiz – (Praiz - Show Me Love") |
| Best Afro Gospel Producer | Best Songwriters |
| **Smj** – (Tim Godfrey - "Nara"); Mr. Tee – (Steph Kerri - "Onye Eze"); Frank Edwards – (Frank Edwards – "Miracle Rain"); Folabi Nuel – Yahweh by Folabi Nuel; Sammie Okposo – Marvelous Thing; Nosa – (Nosa - "Most High") | **Adekunle Gold** – (Adekunle Gold - "Ire"); Davido - (Davido – "Assurance"); Simi - (Simi – "Remind Me"); Peruzzi - (Peruzzi – "Mata"); Johnny Drille - (Johnny Drille – "Awa Love") |
| Male DJ of the Year | Female DJ of the Year |
| **DJ Spinall**; DJ Kaywise; DJ Big N; DJ Neptune; Dj Consequence | **DJ Cuppy**; DJ Nana; DJ Lambo; DJ Switch; DJ Moonlait |
| Best Radio Station | Best Entertainment Station (Terrestrial) |
| **Soundcity FM**; The Beat Fm; Rhythm FM; Urban FM; Cool Fm | **Silverbird Television**; Television Continental; African Independent Television; Channels TV; Lagos Television; Galaxy Television |
| Best Entertainment Station (Cable) | Best Artist Manager |
| **Soundcity TV**; HipTV; Nigezie TV; MTV Base; Planet TV; Afro Music Pop; Music Africa TV | **Asa Asika** – Davido; Taiye Aliu – Yemi Alade; Ubi Franklin – Tekno; Alexander Okeke – Olamide; Osagie Osanrekhoe – Timaya; Emem Ema – Mr. P |
| Best Music Video Director | Best OAP |
| **Unlimited L.A** – (Olamide - "Science Student"); Meji Alabi – (Davido - "Assurance"); Aje Filmworks – (Adekunle Gold - "Ire"); Clarence Peters – (Davido - "Flora My Flawa"); Director Q – (DJ Spinall - "Baba"); Mex – (Johnny Drille - "Halleeluya") | **Do2tun** – Cool FM; Gbemi O. – The Beat FM; Moet Abebe – Soundcity FM; Big Tak – Urban FM; Toke Makinwa – Rhythm FM |
| Best Mixing & Mastering Engineer | Best Record Label |
| **Simi – (Simi - "Remind Me")**; G-Plus Chang – (M.I Abaga - Rendezvous: The Playlist); Swapsonthemix – (Reekado Banks - "Pull Up"); STG – (Wizkid - "Soco"); Olaitan Dada – (Yemi Alade - "Bum Bum"); Mixxmonsta – (Davido - "Assurance"); Tee-Y Mix – (DMW - "Mind") | **Davido Music Worldwide**; Mavin Records; Starboy Entertainment; X3M Music; YBNL Nation; Baseline Music |
| Best Blog | Best Online Music Platform |
| **BellaNaija**; Linda Ikeji Blog; OloriSuperGal; 360 Nobs; Stella Dimoko Korkus | **9jaFlaver**; tooXclusive; 360nobs; NotJustOk; Jaguda.com; NaijaLoaded |
Best Choreographer
**Don Flex** – (Mr. P - "Ebeano"); Kaffy – (Olamide - "Science Student"); Ggb Dance Crew – (Teni - "Askamaya"); Pinky Debbie - (Lil Kesh - "Baby Favour"; Bunmi Olunloyo - Fela & The Kalakuta Queen
