= The Beatz Awards 2019 =

Annual Nigerian music awards ceremony

- Date: 24 November 2019
- Location: Shell Hall, Muson Center, Onikan, Victoria Island
- Hosted by: Dr SID

Highlights
- Most awards: Kel-P (3)
- Most nominations: Johnny Drille (4)

Television/radio coverage
- Network: Silverbird Television; Nigezie TV; wapTV; Television Continental; BEN Television; MTV Base; 98.9 Kiss FM Lagos; Rhythm 93.7 FM Lagos
- Produced by: Eliworld Int'l Limited

The 5th The Beatz Awards was held at Muson Center in Lagos on 24 November 2019. Nominees were revealed on 15 October 2019. The live show was televised on STV, Nigezie Xtreme, wapTV, TVC, BEN Television, and MTV Base, and hosted by Dr SID. It celebrated entertainment personalities across 25 voting categories, with 4 honorary Awards (non-voting). Kel-P had the highest award winnings at The Beatz Awards, by securing 3 awards at the ceremony.

At the ceremony, Don Jazzy was honored with the Lifetime Achievement Award, and the "New Discovery Producer" category was renamed "Don Jazzy New Discovery Producer". While receiving the award, he added a 1 million cash prize to the winner from the 6th edition of the award.

== Performers ==
=== Presenters ===
- Dr SID

== Nominations and winners ==
The following is a list of nominees and the winners are listed highlighted in boldface.

Producer of the Year of the Year	New Discovery Producer of the Year
**Kel-P – (Burna Boy – "On The Low")**; Shizzi – (Davido, Chris Brown – "Blow My Mind"); Rexxie – (Chinko Ekun – "Able God"); Killertunes – (Olamide – "Woske"); Major Bangz – (Kizz Daniel – "One Ticket"); Johnny Drille – (Johnny Drille – "Papa")	**Ozedikus – (Rema – "Dumebi")**; Stunna Beat – (Tekno, 2kingz - "You Can Get It"); Cracker Mallo – (Fireboy DML – "Jealous"); Rexxie – (Zlatan – "Zanku (Legwork)"); Tuzi Beat – (Skiibii – "Sensima"); Dera – (Joeboy – "Baby")
Afro Pop Producer of the Year	Afrobeat Producer of the Year
**Cracker Mallo – (Fireboy DML – "Jealous")**; Kel-P – (Burna Boy – "Killing Dem"); Ozedikus – (Rema – Dumebi); Major Bangz – (Kizz Daniel – "One Ticket"); Dera – Joeboy – Baby; Shizzi – (Davido, Chris Brown – "Blow My Mind"); Rexxie – (Burna Boy – "Anybody"); Tuzi Beat – (Skiibii – "Sensima"); Lusshbeatz – (Kizz Daniel – "Madu")	**Kel-P – (Burna Boy – "Gbona")**; Spellz – (Zlatan, Tiwa Savage - "Shotan"); Chrisstringz – (Timaya – "I Can’t Kill Myself"); Speroachbeatz – (Peruzzi – "Majesty"); Philkeyz – (Kizz Daniel – "Eko"); Sess - (Adekunle Gold – "Kelegbe Megbe"); Blaq Jerzee – (DJ Tunez - "Gbese")
Afro R&B Producer of the Year	Afro Hip Hop Producer of the Year
**Killertunes – (Mr Eazi, Simi – "Doyin")**; Dunnie – (Dunnie – "Foolish"); Irockclassic – (Jaywon – "Aje"); Seyikeyz, Pheelz – (Adekunle Gold, Simi – "Promise"); Oscar – (Simi – "By You"); 1da Banton – (Boomboxx – "I Dey"); Blaq Jerzee – (Iyanya – "No Drama")	**Rexxie – (Chinko Ekun – "Able God")**; Young Williz – (Falz – "Talk"); Pheelz – (Olamide – "Oil And Gas"); Killertunes – (Olamide – "Woske"); Masterkraft – (Masterkraft - "Kere Oh"); B.Banks – (Reminisce – "Burushaga"); Sess – (Falz - "Hypocrite")
Afro Highlife Producer of the Year	Afro Rock Producer of the Year
**Orbeat – (Timaya – "Balance")**; Femi Leye – (Femi Leye – "Bie Ndu"); Selebobo – (Flavour – "Awele"); Chris String – (Rudeboy – "Double Double"); Edgarboi – (Yemi Alade – "Oga"); Legendury Beatz – (Simi – "Ayo"); Young Willis – (Phyno – "The Bag"); Cobhams Asuquo – (Timi Dakolo – "I Never Know Say")	**Johnny Drille – (Johnny Drille – "Shine")**; MonLee Mane – (Zainab Sule – "Toxic Religion"); Kaystrings – (Kaystrings – "Sovereign King (Alagbara)"); Ibk Spaceship Boy – (Bez Idakula – "The Light")
Afro Soul Producer of the Year	Afro Dancehall Producer of the Year
**Seyikeyz - (Teni – "Uyo Meyo")**; Femi Leye – (Femi Leye – "Ife"); Samzi Bumerey – (Samzi Bumerey – "Life"); Johnny Drille – (Johnny Drille – "Papa"); Pedro – (Brymo – "Ba Nu So"); Tiwezi – (Bez Idakula – "Dey For You")	**Kel-P – (Burna Boy – "On The Low")**; Masterkraft – (Timaya – "Bam Bam"); Orbeat – (Timaya, King Perryy, Patoranking – "Kom Kom"); T.U.C. – (King Perryy – "Murder"); Craker Mallo – (Rudeboy – "Together"); Spellz – (DJ Spinall – "Dis Lovee"); Krizbeatz – (Yemi Alade – "Give Dem"); Vtek – (Simi – "Jericho")
Afro Gospel Producer of the Year	Songwriter of the Year
**Skerzbeat – (Mercy Chinwo – "Chinedum")**; Smj – (J.J. Hairston – "Onaga"); Mrtee – (David Jones David – "Giant Killer"); Olaitan Dada – Glowreeyah Braimah – "Exalted"); George, TY Bello – (Tope Alabi - "Logan Ti O De"); Tyanx – (MoniQue – "Timeless"); Sunny Pee – (Ema – "You No Dey Use Me Play"); Doron Clinton – (Freke Umoh - "Hallelujah No Go Finish")	**Johnny Drille – "Papa"**; Burna Boy – "On The Low"; Simi – "Ayo"; Brymo – "Ba Nu So"; Bez Idakula – "Dey For You"
Male DJ of the Year	Female DJ of the Year
**DJ Spinall**; DJ Kaywise; DJ Big N; DJ Neptune; Dj Consequence; DJ Obi; DJ Enimoney; Crowd Kontroller	**DJ Cuppy**; DJ Nana; DJ Lambo; DJ Switch; DJ Butterr
Best Radio Station of the Year	Best Entertainment Station (Terrestrial) of the Year
**Soundcity FM**; The Beat Fm; Rhythm FM; Smooth FM; Cool FM	**Silverbird Television**; Television Continental; African Independent Television; Channels TV; Lagos Television; Galaxy Television; ONTV
Best Entertainment Station (Cable) of the Year	Best Artist Manager of the Year
**Soundcity TV**; HipTV; Nigezie Xtreme; MTV Base; Urban TV; Trace Naija	**Asa Asika** – Davido; Taiye Aliu – Yemi Alade; Osagie Osanrekhoe – Timaya; Emem Ema – Mr. P; Matthew Oyebanji – Johnny Drille
Best Music Video Director of the Year	Best OAP of the Year
**Unlimited L.A** – (Timaya – "Balance"); Meji Alabi – (Wizkid – "Fever"); Aje Filmworks – (Kizz Daniel – Madu"); Clarence Peters – (Burna Boy – "Gbona"); Walinteenpro – (Chinko Ekun – "Able God"); Prodigeezy – (Burna Boy – "Killin Dem"); Director K – (Skiibii – "Sensima"); Ovie Etseyatse – (Kizz Daniel – "One Ticket")	**Moet Abebe** – Soundcity FM; Do2tun – Cool FM; Toke Makinwa – Rhythm FM; Toolz – The Beat Fm; Mazino Appeal – Smooth Fm
Best Mixing & Mastering Engineer of the Year	Best Record Label of the Year
**STG – (Burna Boy – "Killing Them")**; Millamix – (Slimcase – "Azaman"); Lord Sky – Rudeboy – "Reason With Me"); Swaps – Skiibii – "Sensima"); Edward Sunday – (Ccioma – "Wonderful Love"); Olaitan Dada – (Yemi Alade – "Oga"); Wilz Ukaegbu, Okey Sokey – (Bez Idakula – "Dey For You")	**Davido Music Worldwide**; Mavin Records; Starboy Entertainment; X3M Music; YBNL Nation; Flyboy Inc; Spaceship Entertainment
Best Blog of the Year	Best Online Music Platform of the Year
**BellaNaija**; Linda Ikeji Blog; OloriSuperGal; Stella Dimoko Korkus; Kemi Filani	**tooXclusive**; 360nobs; NotJustOk; Jaguda.com; NaijaLoaded; 9jaflaver
Best Choreographer of the Year
**Don Flex** – (Mr. P - "One More Night"); Ggb Dance Crew – (Runtown - "Oh Oh"); Dance Machine – (D'banj - "Mo Cover Eh"); Poco Lee – (Burna Boy - "Killing Dem")	

== Special recognition awards ==
Award description(s)	Recipient
Lifetime Achievement Award	"Don Jazzy"
