= List of awards and nominations received by Spinall =

Awards and nominations list for Nigerian artist

Spinall awards and nominations
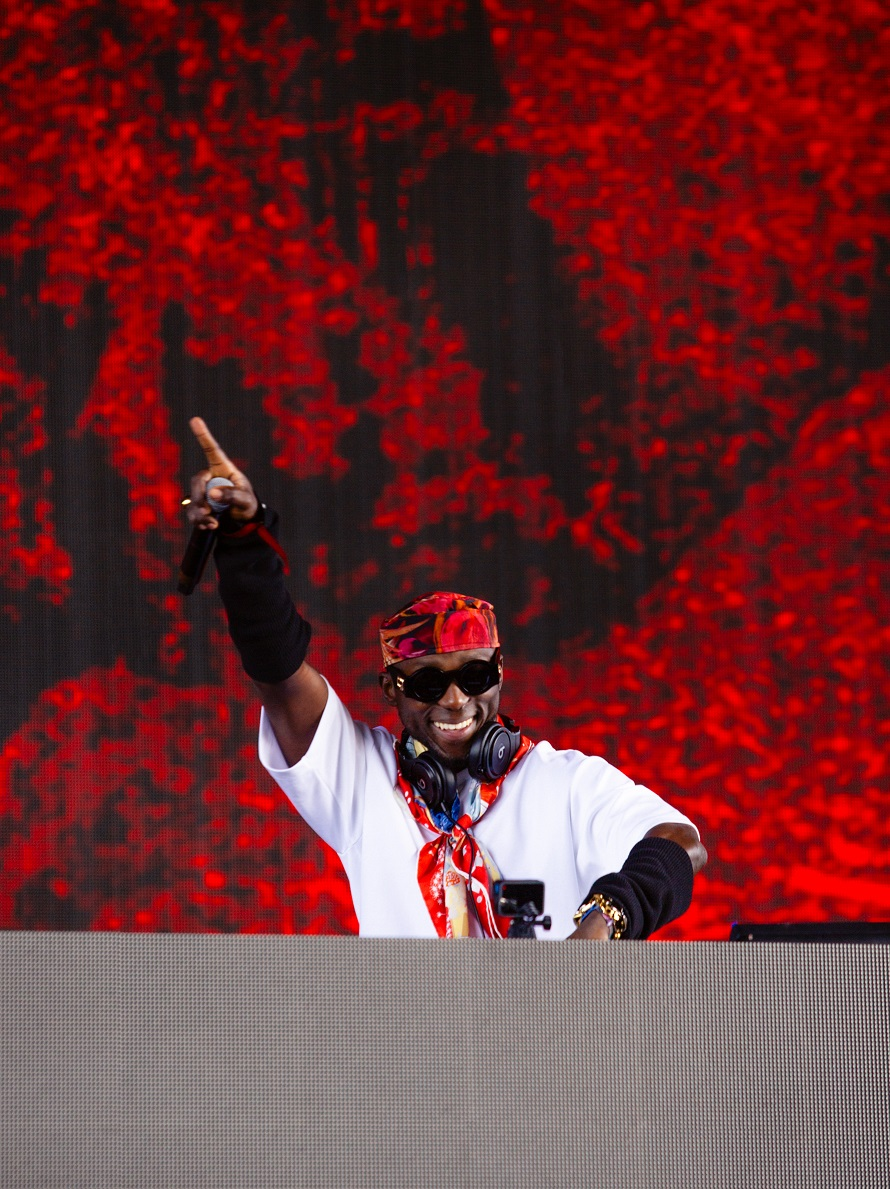
- Spinall DJing in 2024
Awards and nominations
Award	Wins	Nominations
Abryans Style and Fashion Awards	0	1
African Muzik Magazine Awards	3	3
African Entertainment Awards USA	0	1
All Africa Music Awards	0	4
City People Entertainment Awards	2	1
Islander International Awards	1	0
Nigeria Entertainment Awards	1	4
Nigerian Broadcasters Merit Awards	1	0
Soundcity MVP Awards Festival	1	1
The Beatz Awards	4	0

Totals (Note: Certain award groups do not simply award one winner. They acknowledge several different recipients, have runners-up, and have third place. Since this is a specific recognition and is different from losing an award, runner-up mentions are considered wins in this award tally. For simplification and to avoid errors, each award in this list has been presumed to have had a prior nomination.)
- Wins: 14
- Nominations: 15

This is a list of awards and nominations received by Nigerian disc jockey, record producer, and songwriter, SPINALL.

== Awards and nominations ==
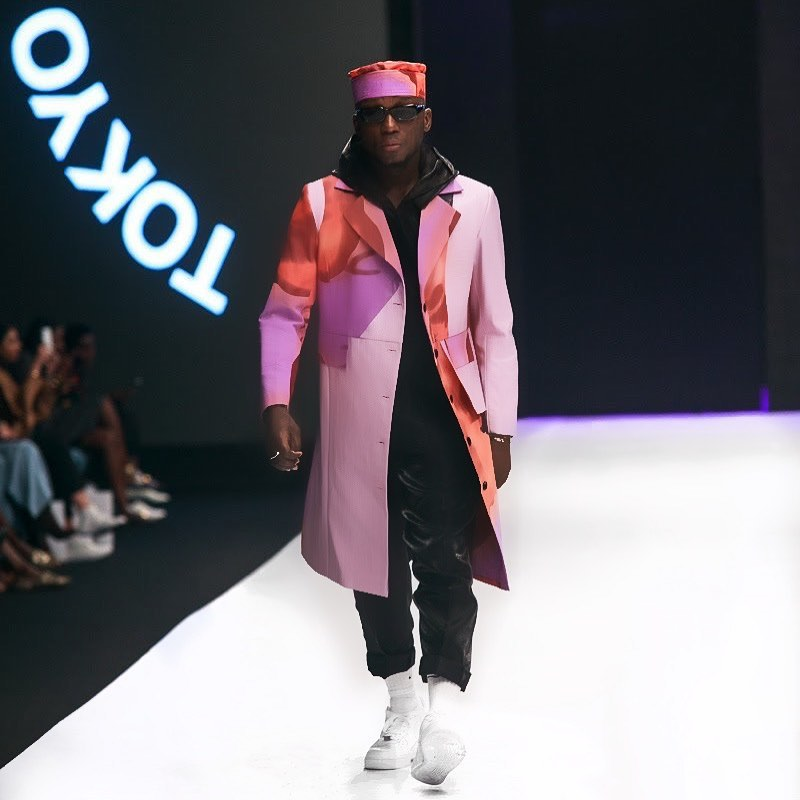
Spinall modeled at Tokyo James set at Lagos Fashion Week in 2019

Award	Year	Category	Work	Result	Ref.
Abryans Style and Fashion Awards	2018	Most Stylish Male Celebrity of the Year	Himself	Nominated	
African Muzik Magazine Awards	2017	Best DJ Africa	Himself	Won	
African Muzik Magazine Awards	2018	Best Collaboration	"Nowo" (featuring. Wizkid)	Nominated	
African Muzik Magazine Awards	2018	Best DJ Africa	Himself	Won	
African Muzik Magazine Awards	2019	Best DJ Africa	Himself	Won	
African Muzik Magazine Awards	2020	Best DJ Africa	Himself	Nominated	
African Muzik Magazine Awards	2021	Best DJ Africa	Himself	Nominated	
African Entertainment Awards USA	2021	Best DJ	Himself	Nominated	
All Africa Music Awards	2018	Best DJ Africa	Himself	Nominated	
All Africa Music Awards	2018	Best African Collaboration	"Nowo" (featuring. Wizkid)	Nominated	
All Africa Music Awards	2018	Best Male Artist in Western Africa	"Nowo" (featuring. Wizkid)	Nominated	
All Africa Music Awards	2021	Best African DJ	Himself	Nominated	
City People Entertainment Awards	2015	DJ Of The Year	Himself	Nominated	
City People Entertainment Awards	2016	DJ Of The Year	Himself	Won	
City People Entertainment Awards	2017	DJ Of The Year	Himself	Won	
Islander International Awards	2014	Best Nigerian DJ	Himself	Won	
Nigeria Entertainment Awards	2013	World DJ	Himself	Nominated	
Nigeria Entertainment Awards	2014	World DJ	Himself	Won	
Nigeria Entertainment Awards	2015	Male Disc Jockey of the Year	Himself	Nominated	
Nigeria Entertainment Awards	2016	Disk Jockey Collaboration of the Year	"Pepe Dem" (featuring Yemi Alade)	Nominated	
Nigeria Entertainment Awards	2017	Best Disc Jockey	Himself	Nominated	
Nigerian Broadcasters Merit Awards	2014	Best Nigeria VDJ	Himself (Channel O)	Won	
Soundcity MVP Awards Festival	2018	African DJ of the Year	Himself	Nominated	
Soundcity MVP Awards Festival	2019	African DJ of the Year	Himself	Won	
The Beatz Awards	2016	Best DJ Male	Himself	Won	
The Beatz Awards	2017	Best DJ Male	Himself	Won	
The Beatz Awards	2018	Best DJ Male	Himself	Won	
The Beatz Awards	2019	Best DJ Male	Himself	Won	
The Beatz Awards	2021	Best DJ Male	Himself	Won	
