= The Beatz Awards 2016 =

Annual Nigerian music awards ceremony

- Date: December 17, 2016
- Location: Shell Hall, Muson Center, Onikan, Victoria Island
- Hosted by: Seyi Law; Lanre Makun

Television/radio coverage
- Network: Silverbird Television; Nigezie TV; wapTV; Television Continental; BEN Television; 98.9 Kiss FM Lagos; Rhythm 93.7 FM Lagos
- Produced by: Eliworld Int'l Limited

The 2nd The Beatz Awards was held at Muson Center in Lagos on December 17, 2016. Nominees were revealed on December 13, 2016. The live show was televised on STV, Nigezie TV, wapTV, TVC and BEN Television, with host Seyi Law, and Lanre Makun.

== Performers ==
=== Presenters ===
- Seyi Law
- Lanre Makun

== Nominations and winners ==
The following is a list of nominees and the winners are listed highlighted in boldface.

Best Producer	New Discovery Producer
**Masterkraft** - "Finally"; DJ Coublon - (Tekno – "Wash"); Cobhams Asuquo - "Boosit"; Pheelz - (Olamide - "Abule Sowo"); Sarz - (2face Idibia - "Coded Tinz"); Young John - (Kiss Daniel - "Mama"); Selebobo - (Yemi Alade - "Na Gode")	**Sess** - (Falz - "Soft Work"); P-Loops - D'Banj - "Emergency"); Krizbeatz - (Tekno - "Pana"); Xela - (Wande Coal - "Super Woman"); Killertunes - (Timaya - "I Concur"); Philkeyz - (May D – "Bamilo"); Mosa - Femi; QaseBeatz - (Cynthia Morgan - "Olowo")
Best Afro Pop Producer	Best Afro Beat Producer
**DJ Altims** – (Reekado Banks - "Oluwa Ni"); Sess - (Falz - "Celebrity Girlfriend"); P-Loops - (Olu Maintain - "Excuse My French"); Reinhard Tega - (Koker - "Kolewerk"); E Kelly - (Ycee - "Omo Alhaji"); Philkeyz - (Yemi Alade - "Koffi Anan"); Beatburx - (Sugarboy - "Hola Hola"); Tee-Y Mix - (9ice – "Pariboto"); Del B - (DJ Spinall - "Package")	**DJ Coublon** - (Kiss Daniel - "Good Time"); P-Loops - D'Banj - "Emergency"); Philkeyz - (May D – "Bamilo"); Don Jazzy - (Tiwa Savage - "African Waist"); Del B - (DJ Jimmy Jatt – "Turn Up"); Legendury Beatz - "Yetunde"; TMXO - (Reminisce – "Nobody Knows"); Otee Beatz - "This Year"
Best Afro R&B Producer	Best Afro Hip Hop Producer
**Mystro** – (Iyanya - "Type of Woman"); Sess - (Falz - "Time Difference"); Reinhard Tega – "Yoruba Demon"; Otee Beatz - "Take Me Away"; Okey Sokay - (Nikki Laoye - "Onyeuwaoma"); Xela - (Wande Coal - "Super Woman"); Masterkraft – (Banky W. - "Made For You"); Mosa - (Mo'Cheddah – "Let Me Love You"); D'Tunes - (Giftty - "One More Time")	**SESS** – (Falz - "Bahd Baddo Baddest"); Shizzi - (Olamide - "Who U Epp"); XBlaze (Base One - "Werey Re O (remix)"); Tha Suspect - "Actor & Boss"; Beats By Karma – (YCEE - "SU MI"); Pheelz - (Lil Kesh - "Cause Trouble"); Cobhams Asuquo - (Tjan – "Meji"); Del B - (Phyno - "Ezege"); Sarz - (Reminisce - "Asalamalekun")
Best Afro Highlife Producer	Best Afro Rock Producer
**Masterkraft** – {Kiss Daniel – "Jombo"); Young D – MONEY; DJ Coublon - (Yemi Alade - "Ferrari"); Selebobo - Where; Don Jazzy - (Tiwa Savage – "Adura"); Jay Pizzle - (Patoranking - "Make Am"); Kezyklef - (Tino Rhymz - "Nku"); Young John - (Lil Kesh - "Semilore")	**RotimiKeys** – Delivere; Johnny Drille - Wait For Me; Phat-E - Yes! You Are The Lord; Cobhams Asuquo - (Mo'Cheddah - "Survive"); QaseBeatz - "All or Nothing"
Best Afro Soul Producer	Best Afro Dancehall Producer
**Cobhams Asuquo** - (Tjan – "Aduke"); Johnny Drille - "My Beautiful Love"; Mystro - "Awele"; Victoriouz Icon - "I Remember"; Tee-Y Mix - (Nikki Laoye - "SuperHuman, SuperWoman"); SizzlePRO - Aramide – "Funmi Lowo"); Mosa - Femi; Oscar Heman-Ackah - (Simi - "Love Don't Care")	**GospelOnDeBeatz** - (Patoranking – "No Kissing"); Jez Blenda - (Timaya - "I Like The Way"); Password - (Geoffrey - "Monalisa"); Sarz – (2face Idibia - "Coded Tinz"); Spellz – (Tiwa Savage - "Key To The City Remix"); Pbanks - (Solid Star - "Wait"); Miconbeatz - (MC Galaxy - "Summer Dance"); Legendury Beatz - (Timaya - "Some More")
Best Afro Jazz Producer	Best Afro Gospel Producer
**Femi Leye** - "Ayo"; Wole Oni - "Igwe"; Yemi Sax - "My Woman, My Everything"; Mike Aremu - "Vow"	**Rotimikeys** - (Mairo Ese - Nani Gi); Wilson Joel - (Nikki Laoye - "Only You"); Mayo - (Sinach - "Way Maker"); Phat-E - Yes! You Are The Lord; SMJ - (Tim Godfrey – "Na You Be God"); Florocka - "Covenant Keeper"; Frank Edwards - "Agam Enye Gi Ekele"; Nathaniel Bassey - "This God Is Too Good"
New Discovery Dj	Best Dj
**DJ Classic**; DJ Mordu; DJ Gavpop; DJ Charlie Sheen; LEGIT DJ BUSFAS; DJ Exprezioni	**DJ Spinall**; DJ Xclusive; DJ Jimmy Jatt; DJ Caise; DJ Big N; DJ Obi; DJ Neptune; DJ Debby; DJ Shabsy; DJ Kentalky
Best Female Dj Of The Year	Best Mixing & Mastering Engineer
**DJ Cuppy**; DJ Mystelle; DJ Nana; DJ Lambo; DJ Switch	**Olaitan Dada** - (Darey - "Pray For Me"); Zeeno Foster - (Kiss Daniel - "New Era (album)"); Tha Suspect - (Illbliss – "Ayakata"); Simi - (Adekunle Gold - "Gold (album)"); VTek - (Diamond Platnumz - "KIDOGO"); Suka Sounds - (Mayorkun - "Eleko"); Indomix - (WizzyPro - "Emergency")
Best Radio Station	Best Entertainment Station (Terrestrial)
**The Beat 99.9 FM**; Cool FM 96.9 - Lagos; Rhythm 93.7 FM Lagos; Classic FM 97.3 Lagos; Wazobia FM 95.1 Lagos; Soundcity 98.5FM Lagos; Urban 96.5 FM Lagos; Top Radio, 90.9 FM Lagos	**Silverbird Television**; Nigerian Television Authority; Africa Independent Television; Television Continental; Lagos Television; Galaxy Television; Channels TV; Wazobia TV; ONTV Nigeria
Best Entertainment Station (Cable)	Best Artist Manager
**HipTV**; Nigezie TV; Soundcity TV; RAVE TV; Pulse TV; Nexus TV; Afro Music Pop; Trace Naija TV; EbonyLife TV	**Sunday Are** - Wizkid; Ubi Franklin - Tekno, Selebobo; Kamal Adeboye – Davido; Louiza Williams – Kiss Daniel; Soso Soberekon – Five Star Music; Alexander Okeke – YBNL Nation
Best Music Video Director	Best Live Band
**Aje Filmworks**; Clarence Peters; Adasa Cookey; Unlimited L.A; Sesan; Frizzle N Bizzle Films	**Shuuga Band**; Sharp Band; Eboni Band; Veentage Band; Adrenaline Band; Faith Band
Best Songwriters	Best OAP
**Kiss Daniel - Mama**; Mystro - (Iyanya - "Type of Woman"); Nikki Laoye - "Only You (remix)"; Florocka - "The Impressions (album)"; Illbliss - "Ayakata"; Harrysong - (Patoranking - "Love Town"); Cobhams Asuquo - (Tjan – "Aduke")	**Elvina Ibru**; Do2tun; Toolz; Fola Folayan; Yaw; VJ Adams; Tosyn Bucknor; Moet Abebe; Toke Makinwa; Oreka Godis
Best Record Company (Marketer)	Best Record Label
**Uba Pacific**; Ahbu Ventures; Tjoe Productions; Obaino Music; Person Entertainment	**Starboy Entertainment**; YBNL Nation; Chocolate City; Mavin Records; X3M Music; Five Star Music; G-Worldwide Entertainment
Best Blog	Best Online Music Platform
**BellaNaija**; Linda Ikeji Blog; OloriSuperGal; Lazywrita; YNaija; The BBBuzz	**tooXclusive**; 360nobs; NotJustOk; Jaguda.com; NaijaLoaded; Music Plus; Cloud9 Music
Best Choreographer
**Kaffy**; Alien Nation Dance Crew; Lovette; GGB Dance Crew; Nonso Asobe
