= Nigerian Idol season 6 =

Season of a TV show

Nigerian Idol
- Season 6
- Promotional poster
- Hosted by: IK Osakioduwa
- Judges: Obi Asika; Seyi Shay; DJ Sose

Release
- Original network: Africa Magic
- Original release: 14 March – 11 July 2021

Season chronology
- Next → Season 7

The sixth season of Nigerian Idol premiered on 14 March 2021 on Africa Magic Network on DStv channel 198. The show host is IK Osakioduwa, while Obi Asika, Seyi Shay and DJ Sose as judges. On 3 February 2021, the show, was made available for streaming in United Kingdom, Italy, France, Australia and 23 other countries, through the online streaming network Showmax. On 9 May 2021, the first live show kicked-off featuring the 11 contestants, who made it to the finals, as public voting opens to the fans for 10 weeks.

== Weekly Results And Songchoices ==
=== Top 11:The Classics (9 May) ===
Act	Order	Song	Result
Akunna	1	"Wombo Lombo" by Angélique Kidjo	Safe
Beyonce	2	"Agolo" by Angélique Kidjo	Safe
Clinton	3	"Sweet Mother" by Prince Nico Mbarga	Safe
Comfort	4	"Olufumi" by Styl-Plus	Safe
Daniel	5	"I've Got You Babe" by Lucky Dube	Safe
Dotun	6	"Malaika" by Mariam Makeba	Eliminated
Emmanuel	7	"Send Down The Rain" by Majek Fashek	Safe
Faith Jason	8	"Joromi" by Uwaifo	Safe
Faith Mac	9	"Africa" by Salif Keita	Eliminated
Francis	10	"Remember Me" by Lucky Dube	Safe
Kingdom	11	"Lion Sleeps Tonight" by Lebo M	Safe

=== Top 9 (16 May) ===
Act	Order	Song	Result
Kingdom	1	"Uyo Meyo" by Teni	Safe
Daniel	2	"Empty Space" by James Arthur	Safe
Faith Jason	3	"All Time Low" by Jon Bellion	Safe
Beyonce	4	"Dynamite" by BTS	Safe
Emmanuel	5	"Beneath Your Beautiful" by Labrinth	Safe
Akkuna	6	"XO" by Beyonce	Safe
Clinton	7	"Tonight" by John Legend	Eliminated
Francis	8	"Writing's on the Wall" by Sam Smith	Safe
Comfort	9	"Ire" by Adekunle Gold	Safe

=== Top 8 (23 May) ===
Act	Order	Song	Result
Daniel	1	"Good Morning" by Brymo	Eliminated
Comfort	2	"Duduke" by Simi	Safe
Faith Jason	3	"Awele" by Favor	Safe
Emmanuel	4	"For You" by Teni	Safe
Akunna	5	"Loving Your Way" by Seyi Shay	Safe
Francis	6	"Ada Ada" by Flavor	Safe
Kingdom	7	"Aye" by Davido	Safe
Beyonce	8	"Right Now" by Seyi Shay	Safe

=== Top 7: Birth year songs (30 May) ===
Act	Order	Song	Result
Beyonce	1	"Unfaithful by Rihanna	Eliminated
Francis	2	"Please Forgive Me" by Bryan Adams	Safe
Comfort	3	"Beautiful" by Christina Aguilera	Safe
Faith Jason	4	"You Are Not Alone" by Michael Jackson	Safe
Kingdom	5	"Unbreak My Heart" by Toni Braxton	Safe
Akunna	6	"How Do I Live" by LeAnn Rimes	Safe
Emmanuel	7	"Kiss From A Rose" by Seal	Safe

=== Top 6: Fela week (4 June) ===
Act	Order	Fela song	Result
Comfort	1	"Observation Is No Crime"	Safe
Faith Jason	2	"Palava"	Safe
Francis	3	"Yellow Fever"	Safe
Emmanuel	4	"No Agreement"	Eliminated
Kingdom	5	"Gentlemen"	Safe
Akunna	6	"Lady"	Safe

=== Top 5: Morden Pop&Jazz (13 June) ===
Act	Order	Modern Pop	Order	Jazz	Result
Faith Jason	1	"Someone You Loved" by Lewis Capaldi	6	"I'd Rather Go Blind" by Etta James	Eliminated
Comfort	2	"Thinking Out Loud" by Ed Sheeran	7	"Save The Last Dance" by Micheal Bublé	Safe
Kingdom	3	"Just The Way You Are" by Bruno Mars	8	"Feeling Good" by Cici feat. Nina Simone	Safe
Akunna	4	"Wrecking Ball" by Miley Cyrus	9	"I Put A Spell On You" by Nina Simone	Safe
Francis	5	"To Good At Goodbyes" by Sam Smith	10	"Hello" by Lionel Richie	Safe

== Audition ==
On 28 November 2020, Nigerian Idol announced an online auditions to be held from 29 November to 13 December. The online audition participants are to record their 30 seconds video of them singing and to be uploaded on Africa Magic website.

== Contestant ==
=== Theatre week ===
On 24 April 2021, 68 contestants head to theatre week. On 30 April 2021, at the end of the day, out of the 68 contestants that made it into theatre week, and 39 to the group selections, only 21 contestants progressed to the next round.

On 3 May 2021, during the third theatre week, contestants were assessed based on the strength of their voices and their overall stage performance. Out of 21 contestants who made the theatre week, only 11 made it to the finals. On 11 July 2021, Kingdom Kroseide emerged as the winner of the sixth season of the tvshow.

Order	Contestant	Song (Original Artist)
1	Comfort Alalade	"Case" (Teni)
2	Akunna Okey	"Joromi" (Simi)
3	Faith Onyeje	"I'm Not the Only One" (Sam Smith)
4	Kingdom Kroseide	"Say Something" (A Great Big World)
5	Dotun Deloye	"Sade" (Adekunle Gold)
6	Francis Atela	"So High" (John Legend)
7	Daniel Ikechi	"Hallelujah" (Leonard Cohen
8	Beyonce Ajomiwe	"Boo'd Up" (Ella Mai)
9	Clinton Francis	"Under The Sky" (Praiz)
10	Emmanuel Elijah	"A Change Is Gonna Come" (Sam Cooke)
11	Faith Mac Ebiama	"Dangerous Woman" (Ariana Grande)

Nigerian Idol (season 7)

== Finalists ==
=== Finalists ===
(ages stated at time of contest)

Contestant	Age	Hometown
Comfort Alalade	18	Lagos
Akunna Okey	23	
Faith Onyeje	25	
Kingdom Kroseide	24	Port Harcourt
Dotun Deloye	24	
Francis Atela	26	
Daniel Ikechi	24	
Beyonce Ajomiwe	16	Port Harcourt
Clinton Francis	24	
Emmanuel Elijah	25	Lagos
Faith Mac Ebiama	22	

== Elimination Chart ==
Colour key

–	Winner
–	Runner-up
–	Eliminated
–	Withdrew

Weekly results per act
Act	Top 10	Top 9	Top 8	Top 7	Top 6	Top 5	Top 4	Top 3	Top 2
Kingdom	Safe	Safe	Safe	Safe	Safe	Safe	Safe	Safe	Winner
Francis	Safe	Safe	Safe	Safe	Safe	Safe	Safe	Safe	Runner-up
Akunna	Safe	Safe	Safe	Safe	Safe	Safe	Safe	3rd place	Eliminated
Comfort	Safe	Safe	Safe	Safe	Safe	Safe	4th place	Eliminated	
Faith Jason	Safe	Safe	Safe	Safe	Safe	5th place	Eliminated		
Emmanuel	Safe	Safe	Safe	Safe	6th place	Eliminated			
Beyonce	Safe	Safe	Safe	7th place	Eliminated				
Daniel	Safe	Safe	8th place	Eliminated					
COntin	Safe	9th place	Eliminated						
Dotun	Withdrew	Eliminated							
Faith Mac	Eliminated								
Siya Motloung	Eliminated								
Misty Makhene	Eliminated								
Andiswa Zondi	Eliminated								
Sinovuyo Mbhele	Eliminated								
Tesmin-Robyn Khanye	Eliminated								
