= Tee-Y Mix =

Nigerian music executive

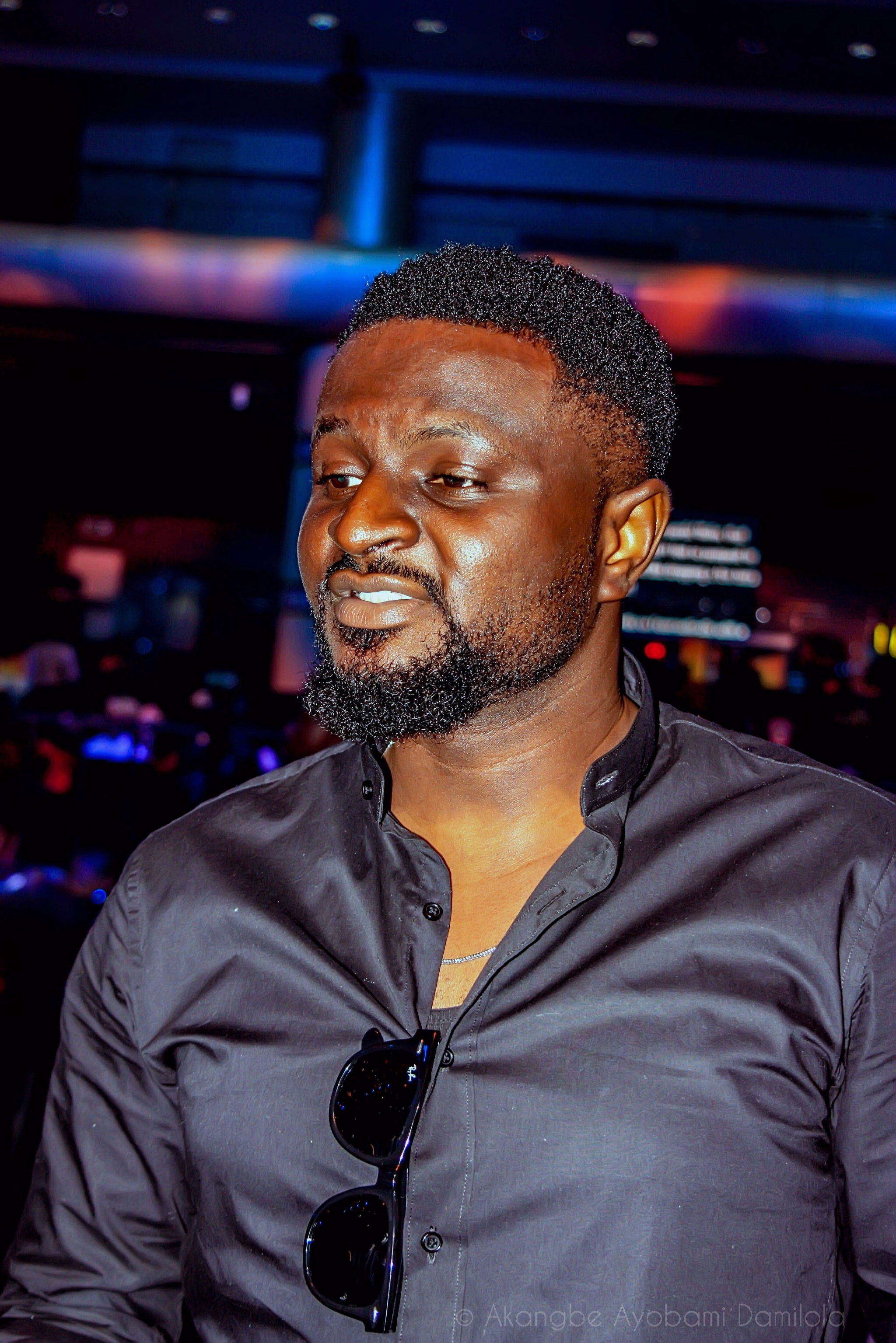
- Born: Temitayo Ibitoye; 22 August 1983 (age 43); Ibadan, Oyo State
- Education: University of Abuja
- Occupations: A&R; Sound engineer; Music executive; Producer; Television personality
- Years active: 2008–present
- Employer: Dapper Group
- Organization: Vivace Records
- Notable work: U Know My "P" (2008)
- Title: Label executive
- Board member of: Vivace Records; Dapper Group
- Awards: Producer of the Year (2012)

Temitayo Ibitoye, popularly known as Tee-Y Mix is a Nigerian music executive, and board member of Dapper Group. He is widely known for producing Naeto C's major hit "Kini Big Deal", which earned him a nomination at The Headies for Producer of the Year in 2009. He also served as an A&R executive, sound engineer and primary producer, on Naeto C's debut studio album U Know My "P", which was released in 2008. Following his departure from Storm 360, he founded Vivace Records in 2014 and is the Chief Executive Officer.

As a sound engineer, he was credited for mixing Davido's "Gobe", "Aye", "Skelewu" from Queen of Katwe Soundtrack album, D'Banj's "Don't Tell Me Nonsense" from D'Kings Men compilation album, Dr SID's "Surulere" from SID's second studio album Siduction album, and Praiz's "Mercy" from his double studio album Rich & Famous [Famous]. As a television personality, he was a judge on Project Fame West Africa from 2008 to 2016. On 17 October 2023, Dapper Damm named him Vice President of Dapper Group.

== Early life ==
Temitayo Ibitoye is a native of Ondo State. He was born on 22 August 1983 in Oyo State and grew up between Kaduna and Abuja. He is an alumnus of the University of Abuja where he graduated with a degree in Computer science. He got his diploma in Audio Recording Engineering from the Audio Institute of America

== Career ==
On 3 August 2012, Tee-Y Mix produced the Hennessy Artistry theme song "Bartender" by M.I and Naeto C for Hennessy. On 14 January 2022, he released his first official single "Closer". The song features guest vocals from Oxlade and Moelogo.

=== Project Fame West Africa ===
In 2008, Tee-Y Mix appeared as one of three judges for the reality television music competition show Project Fame West Africa. Tee-Y Mix, along with fellow judges Adé Bantu and Bibie Brew, evaluated thousands of amateur contestants in their ability to sing. Tee-Y Mix won praise as a sympathetic and compassionate judge. In 2020, he was also a judge on the pilot season of Access the stars music TV reality show.

=== Vivace Records ===
In 2014 Tee-Y Mix launched his record label Vivace Records. Artist signed to Vivace Records.

Act	Year signed	Releases under the label
Immaculate	2014	2
Oyinkanade	2014	5
IB Josh	2016	1

=== Public speaking ===
- MTN Business of the Arts workshop (2020).
- NEC Live (2022).

== Production discography ==
=== Singles produced ===
Title	Year	Album	Release date
"Kini Big Deal" (Naeto C)	2008	U Know My "P"	1 August 2008
"Ring Tone" (Naeto C)	2008	U Know My "P"	1 August 2008
"Devil is a Liar" (Naeto C)	2008	U Know My "P"	1 August 2008
"One 4 Me" (Naeto C)	2008	U Know My "P"	1 August 2008
"Adara" (Sasha P)	2008	Gidi Babe	2009
"Carry Dey Go" (Darey)	2009	unDAREYted	24 April 2008
"Love Truly" (Iyanya)	2009	My Story	27 January 2010
"Ten Over Ten" (Naeto C)	2009	Super C Season	7 February 2011
"5 & 6" (Naeto C)	2011	Super C Season	7 February 2011
"Ex-Girlfriend" (Naeto C)	2011	Super C Season	7 February 2011
"Duro" (Naeto C)	2011	Super C Season	7 February 2011
"Afuru'm gi nanya (I luv u)" (Naeto C)	2011	Super C Season	7 February 2011
"Deja Vu (Our Drinks)" (Naeto C)	2011	Super C Season	7 February 2011
"Voodoo" (Naeto C)	2011	Super C Season	7 February 2011
"C me finish" (Naeto C)	2011	Super C Season	7 February 2011
"3310" (9ice)	2011	Bashorun Gaa	12 December 2011
"Beautiful"; Kefee	2012	Non-Album	
"Tony Montana" (Naeto C)	2012	Non-Album	
"Bartender" (M.I & Naeto C)	2012	Non-Album	
"Natural Something" (Sound Sultan)	2012	Me, My Mouth & Eye	2 September 2013
"Celebrate" (Kefee)	2012	Chorus Leader	16 March 2015
"Drowning" (Iyanya)	2013	Desire	6 February 2013
"Omo Shelen Geh" (SHiiKANE)	2013	Non-Album	
"Wait For Me" (Tonye)	2013	Non-Album	
"Pick Pin" (P.R.E)	2014	Non-Album	
"Gogo Baby" (Immaculate)	2014	Non-Album	
"What Ur Feeling" (May7ven)	2014	Non-Album	
"Moleje Shicken" (T-Rockk)	2015	Non-Album	
"Oyin (Honey)" (Oyinkanade)	2015	Non-Album	
"Osanle" (Immaculate)	2015	Non-Album	
"School Your Face" (Temi Dollface)	2015	Non-Album	
"No Vacancy" (Seyi Shay)	2015	Seyi or Shay	16 November 2015
"Love Wan Tin Tin" (Seyi Shay)	2015	Seyi or Shay	16 November 2015
"SuperHuman, SuperWoman" (Nikki Laoye)	2015	The 123 Project	12 December 2014
"Monsura" (Sound Sultan)	2015	Non-Album	
"Taxi Driver" (Coco Benson)	2015	Non-Album	
"Pariboto" (9ice)	2016	Non-Album	
"Yebo" (IB Josh)	2016	Non-Album	
"Stay with me" (Sky D)	2019	Non-album	22 April 2019

=== Singles mixed ===
Title	Year	Album	Release date
"Skelewu" (Davido)	2013	Non-Album	
"Don’t Tell Me Nonsense" (D'banj)	2013	Non-Album	
"GOBE" (Davido)	2013	Non-Album	
"Surulere" (Dr SID)	2013	Siduction	20 December 2013
"Aye" (Davido)	2014	TBA	
"Mercy" (Praiz)	2014	Rich & Famous [Famous]	12 December 2014

=== Movie soundtracks ===
Sound Track(s) Produced By Tee-Y Mix

Film
Year	Movie(s)	Role(s)
2012	Journey to Self	SoundTrack Producer

== Accolades ==
Year	Awards ceremony	Award description(s)	Results
2009	The Headies	Producer of the Year	Nominated
2009	The Future Awards	Producer of the Year	Nominated
2010	The Headies	Producer of the Year	Nominated
2010	The Future Awards	Producer of the Year	Nominated
2011	The Future Awards	Producer of the Year	Nominated
2012	The Headies	Producer of the Year	Won
2013	Africa Movie Academy Awards	Achievement in Soundtrack (Journey to Self)	Nominated
2015	The Beatz Awards	Best Afro Beat Producer	Nominated
2016	The Beatz Awards	Best Afro Pop Producer	Nominated
2016	The Beatz Awards	Best Afro Soul Producer	Nominated
2018	The Beatz Awards	Afro Pop Producer Of The Year	Nominated

== See also ==
- List of Nigerian musicians
