= Nigeria Innovation Summit =

- Status: Active
- Genre: Technology Innovation
- Venue: Muson Centre, Lagos
- Location: Lagos
- Country: Nigeria
- Years active: 10 years
- Founder: Tony Ajah
- Website: https://innovationsummit.ng/

Nigeria Innovation Summit (NIS) is an annual event in Nigeria focused on fostering innovation, technology, entrepreneurship, and collaboration among stakeholders in the tech and innovation ecosystem. The summit is convened under the leadership of Tony Ajah, the NIS Programmes Director, and provides a platform to discuss opportunities, innovative solutions addressing the distinctive challenges faced in Nigeria and across Africa.

== History ==
NIS was founded in 2016 and has been held annually ever since, growing over time in scope, participation, and influence. It is organised by InnovationHub Africa & Resources Ltd, along with Emerging Media Nigeria (and associated partners), the summit brings together innovators, entrepreneurs, government agencies, academia, investors, and other stakeholders to exchange ideas, showcase innovations, and drive growth in Nigeria's innovation ecosystem.

The 2025 edition, themed “Sustainable Innovation”, was held 7–8 October 2025 at Muson Centre, Lagos.
