= Ten Over Ten =

Single by Naeto C

from the album Super C Season
- Released: August 16, 2010
- Recorded: 2010
- Genre: Hip hop
- Length: 3:46
- Label: Storm Records
- Songwriter: Naetochukwu Chikwe
- Producer: Ty Mix

Naeto C singles chronology
"Duro" (2009)	"Ten Over Ten" (2010)	"Share My Blessings" (2011)

"Ten Over Ten" is the third single from Nigerian rapper Naeto C's Super C Season album. It was released on August 16, 2010.

== About the song ==
The song is produced by Nigerian producer Ty Mix whom Naeto C has collaborated with on a handful of songs including seven different ones on his Super C Season album. Its three verses were written by the rapper. It is an up-tempo track and its rhythm and lyrics have a good laid back feel to it. The rapper described the phrase "Ten Over Ten" as a state of being cool, tight, on point, anything that makes sense, to ooze swag.

The song has generally received positive reviews and a lot of airplay and has generally heightened the anticipation around the rapper's forthcoming album. The rapper employs the use of his local igbo dialect, Yoruba, "Broken English" or Nigerian Pidgin English and English in the singing of the song's chorus but all his verses are restricted purely to English and Nigerian Pidgin English.
