= Olawuyi =

- Gender: Male
- Language: Yoruba

Origin
- Origin: Nigeria
- Meaning: Wealth is greater
- Region of origin: South-west Nigeria

Other names
- Short form: Ola

Olawuyi audio is a Yoruba surname from Nigeria, meaning "Wealth is Greater". Common variants of the name includes "Ola", "Wuyi" e.t.c.

Notable individuals with the name include:

- Kolawole Olawuyi, investigative journalist, broadcaster and storyteller
- Damilola Sunday Olawuyi, Nigerian international lawyer
- Raheem Olawuyi, Nigerian politician
- Adenike Olawuyi, Nigerian basketball player
- Adedayo Olawuyi, chief commercial officer of United Nigeria Airlines.
