= Kingdom Kroseide =

Nigerian singer (born 1997)

- Born: God's Kingdom Timitemeoweipere Kroseide; 24 April 1997 (age 29); Bayelsa State, Nigeria
- Occupations: Singer; Songwriter; Reality TV Star; Vocal Coach
- Musical career
- Genres: RnB; Soul
- Instruments: Vocals, Keyboard
- Years active: 2019–present
- Label: Cabal Records

God's Kingdom Timitemeoweipere Kroseide (born April 24, 1997) or simply known as Kingdom is a Nigerian singer, songwriter and vocal coach. He rose to prominence for his performance on Nigerian Idol Season 6 in 2021, eventually going on to win the competition over his fellow Top 2 contestant, Francis Atela. He is also the Youth Ambassador to the Bayelsa State Government.

== Early life ==
Kroseide was born on April 24, 1997, in Ajegunle, Lagos State, Nigeria. He is the first of four children and has a younger brother and two younger sisters. Kroseide grew up in Lagos and moved to Port-Harcourt after his secondary school education. He sometimes refers to himself as a 'Port-Harcourt Boy'.

He attended the Nigerian Military School in Zaria for secondary education and then went on to the Federal University, Otuoke in Bayelsa State to study Computer Science and Informatics.

== Career ==
=== 2019-2020: I Sabi Sing ===
In October 2019, Kroseide competed in a local music competition called I Sabi Sing which was held in nine states in the Niger Delta region of Nigeria including his home state, Bayelsa. He went on to win the Bayelsa State finals and was awarded a cash prize of One Million Naira.

After winning I Sabi Sing, Kroseide became a member of the Pamela Scott Music Band which was located in Port-Harcourt, Rivers State as a vocalist and Keyboardist. Kroseide along with the band, were invited to perform at birthday parties, church services, wedding ceremonies and other events.

=== 2020-2021: Nigerian Idol ===
In 2020, Kroseide was encouraged by a family member to audition for the sixth edition of Nigerian Idol. For the audition, he gave a rendition of Whitney Houston’s I Look To You which brought one of the judges to tears and moved another to hug him and hand him his golden ticket. The audition was the beginning of his rise to fame.

After a series of theatre week auditions, Kroseide was chosen as a member of the Top 11 finalists who would perform for votes in the Live shows.

For the Top 11 Live show, he performed Lebo M’s The Lion Sleeps Tonight mashed up with an excerpt from Circle of Life from the same artist. This performance became the most critically acclaimed performance of the season and helped him gain more international popularity.

After having a bad performance at the Top 8 Live Shows, the Critics were skeptical about his performance capabilities even though he was the best vocalist on the show. According to Kroseide, he listened to the reviews and came back with a bang in his Top 6 performance of Fela Kuti’s Gentleman. The judges look back on that moment as when Kroseide really came out of his shell.

For the Top 4 live show, Kroseide went on to perform It's a Man's Man's Man's World from the King of Soul James Brown in what is described as his most eventful performance on the show.

In the Semi-finals, he was chosen as one of the Top 2 contestants who would face-off for the winning prize along with Francis Atela. After an intense battle and eighteen million votes, Kroseide went on to win Nigerian Idol by a landslide, taking home a cash prize of 30 million Naira, a brand new SUV, a recording contract for a six track EP and three music videos and a lot more prizes from the sponsors of the show.

=== 2021-Present: After Nigerian Idol, Music, Endorsements and Appointments ===
After Kroseide’s Nigerian Idol won, he immediately went on a homecoming to his native state of Bayelsa. On the visit, he paid a courtesy visit to the Governor Douye Diri who commended him on his achievements and proceeded to give him an educational scholarship up to Master’s Degree and also appointed him Youth Ambassador for Bayelsa State.

Kroseide also went on a homecoming to his city of residence Port Harcourt in Rivers State. He attended a meet and greet organized by his fans and performed at JAS concert, hosted by House on The Rock Church in Port Harcourt city.

On August 27, 2021, Kroseide signed an endorsement deal with WAW Detergent produced by Henkel Nigeria. He was signed alongside Nigerian Idol second runner-up, Akunna. The endorsement deal was speculated by his fans after he represented the brand in an appearance in the Big Brother Naija house. He made another appearance for the brand along with Akunna in the Big Brother Naija house to present a sponsored task to the housemates, in the tenth and final week of the show.

On the 14th of February 2022, Kroseide released his first original song which is titled "Love Call" on YouTube to celebrate Valentine’s Day. Kroseide used the track to send a message of working hard to make relationships work and giving all the love with no regrets. The song was met with positive reviews from his fans who praised his writing skills and the message behind the song as well as his vocal delivery. Love Call was released under Cabal Records as part of the recording contract he got through his win on Nigerian Idol.

On 5 April 2022, Kroseide announced the release of his debut single titled "Shey You Go Dey". The song was met with critical acclaim with his fans praising his new sound and massively supporting the single. The song is a slow tempo alternative Afrobeat record and is lyrically based on a man who is trying to convince his love interest to let herself fall in love. The music video was subsequently released on the 15th of April.

Kroseide performed his debut single live for the first time on the stage of the seventh edition of Nigerian Idol as a guest performance. The single was met with support from the contestants, audience, and new panel of judges as well as the viewers who had voted for him on the previous season.

At the eighth edition of the Africa Magic Viewers’ Choice Awards, Kroseide along with fellow Nigerian Idol finalist, Akunna Okechukwu, paid a tear-jerking tribute to the actors and actresses who had died, performing a cover of Beyonce’s I Was Here while the names of the fallen appeared on the screen one by one.

== Filmography ==
=== Television ===
Year	Title	Role	Notes
2021	Nigerian Idol Season 6	Himself	Reality Talent Competition
2021	Big Brother Naija Season 6	Task Presenter	Reality show
2022	Nigerian Idol Season 7	Guest Performer	Reality Talent Competition
2022	Africa Magic Viewers’ Choice Awards	Guest Performer	Awards Show

== Personal life ==
Kroseide identifies as a devout Christian. He is a member of Living Faith Church Worldwide and The Logic Church. He refers to himself as a church kid. He has a passion for sounds and musical arrangements which was what inspired him to learn how to sing. By watching YouTube videos, Kroseide was able to improve his singing ability and he also began teaching music to other people.
