= You Know My "P" =

Studio album by Naeto C
- Released: May 2008
- Recorded: 2006–2008
- Genre: Hip hop
- Length: 67:12
- Label: World Famous Akademy; Storm
- Producer: Obi Asika (exec); Naetochukwu Chikwe (exec); Tee-Y Mix; VC Perez; Don Jazzy

Naeto C chronology
| You Know My "P" (2008) | Super C Season (2011) |

Singles from You Know My "P"
- 1. "Kini Big Deal"; 2. "Sitting on Top"; 3. "You Know My P"

You Know My "P" is the debut studio album by Nigerian rapper Naeto C, released in May of 2008. Guest appearances include Ikechukwu, Wande Coal and Saro Wiwa. It was one of the most popular albums in Nigeria in 2008, selling over 1 million copies.

== Critical reception ==
In a retrospective review, Joey Akan of Pulse Nigeria said that You Know My "P" was a "well-put together album", concluding, "Naeto ushered in a new rap culture in Nigeria with is cool, laid-back and pop driven album."

== Track listing ==
| No. | Title | Writer(s) | Producer(s) | Length |
|---|---|---|---|---|
| 1. | "The Devil Is a Liar" | Naetochukwu Chikwe | Ty Mix | 4:32 |
| 2. | "This Is What I Do" | Chikwe | Ty Mix | 4:10 |
| 3. | "Kini Big Deal" (featuring Ikechukwu) | Chikwe, Ikechukwu Onunaku | Ty Mix | 4:00 |
| 4. | "Sitting on Top" | Chikwe | Vc Perez | 4:14 |
| 5. | "U Know My P" (featuring Ikechukwu) | Chikwe, Onunaku | Vc Perez | 4:00 |
| 6. | "Gidi" | Chikwe | Ty Mix, Vc Perez | 4:05 |
| 7. | "Lagos City Hustler" | Chikwe | Ty Mix | 4:34 |
| 8. | "I've Been" | Chikwe | Vc Perez | 4:02 |
| 9. | "One 4 Me" (featuring Wande Coal) | Chikwe, Wande Ojosipe | | 4:15 |
| 10. | "Ashawo" (featuring Wande Coal) | Chikwe, Ojosipe | Don Jazzy | 4:22 |
| 11. | "Ringtone" | Chikwe | Ty Mix | 5:06 |
| 12. | "E Mara Mma" (featuring Saro Wiwa) | Chikwe, Saro Wiwa | Vc Perez | 3:55 |
| 13. | "Superman" | Chikwe | Ty Mix | 4:04 |
| 14. | "Facebook" | Chikwe | Ty Mix | 4:41 |
| 15. | "Bami Lo" (featuring Morell) | Chikwe, Musa Akilah | Ty Mix | 4:48 |
| 16. | "Don't Judge/Outro" | Chikwe | Prophet | 1:58 |

Bonus tracks
| No. | Title | Writer(s) | Length |
|---|---|---|---|
| 17. | "Made in Lagos" | Naetochukwu Chikwe |

== Release history ==
Release history and formats for You Know My "P"
| Region | Date | Format | Label |
|---|---|---|---|
| Nigeria | May 2008 | CD | Storm |
| Nigeria | 1 August 2008 | Digital download | Storm |
