= Nigerian Idol season 7 =

Season of a TV show

Nigerian Idol
- Season 7
- Hosted by: IK Osakioduwa
- Judges: Obi Asika; Simi; D'banj
- No. of episodes: 10

Release
- Original network: Africa Magic
- Original release: February 2022 – present

Season chronology
- ← Previous; Season 6

The seventh season of Nigerian Idol premiered in January 2022. Progress Chukwuyem won the Nigerian Idol for season 7.

== Weekly Song Choices and Results ==
=== Top 12 (20 March) ===
Act	Order	Song	Result
Abigail	1	"Rain On Me" by Lady Gaga	Safe
David Operah	2	"Before You Go" by Lewis Capaldi	Safe
Faith	3	"Driver's Licence" by Olivia Rodrigo	Safe
Jordan	4	"Rolling In The Deep" by Adele	Safe
Zadok	5	"Perfect" by Ed Sheeran	Safe
Progress	6	"Heartbreak Anniversary" by Giveon	Safe
Joel	7	"Easy On Me" by Adele	Eliminated
Banty	8	"Thinking Out Loud" by Ed Sheeran	Safe
Gerald	9	"Leave The Door Open" by Silk Sonic	Safe
Precious	10	"Felony" by Ckay	Eliminated
Itohan	11	"Shallow" by Lady Gaga	Safe
Debby	12	"Monalisa" by Lojay	Safe

=== Top 10: African Greats (27 March) ===
Act	Order	Song	Result
Zadok	1	"Back To The Matter" by Wizkid	Safe
Debby	2	"Vul'indlela" by Brenda Fassie	Safe
Gerald	3	"Ifunanya" by P-square	Elimimated
Faith	4	"Never Far Away" by Lagbaja	Safe
Itohan	5	"If You Ask Me" by Omawumi	Safe
Abigail	6	"Emergency" by D'banj	Safe
Progress	7	"Joy" by Wizkid	Safe
Jordan	8	"Ye" by Burna Boy	Safe
Banty	9	"Aye" by Davido	Safe
David Operah	10	"Street Credibility" by 9ice	Safe

=== Top 9: Inspirations (03 April) ===
Act	Order	Song	Result
Jordan	1	"You Say" by Lauren Diagle	Safe
Progress	2	"Uncle Suru" by Jon Ogah	Safe
Itohan	3	"Can't Give Up Now" by Mary Mary	Safe
Abigail	4	"Higher Love" by Whitney Houston	Eliminated
Zadok	5	"Wish Me Well" by Timi Dakolo	Safe
David Operah	6	"Dance With My Father" by Luther Vandross	Safe
Debby	7	"Happy" by Pharrell Williams	Safe
Faith	8	"Next To Me" by Emile Sande	Safe
Banty	9	"Lean On Me" by Bill Withers	Safe

- The Top 10 performed "Stand Up" by Cynthia Erivo for their group performance.

=== Top 8: Greatest Soundtracks/This is Me (10 April) ===
Act	Order	Song	Result
David Opera	1	"Great Nation" by Timi Dakolo	Safe
Itohan	2	"I Look To You" by Jon Whitney Houston	Safe
Zadok	3	"Soul Provider" by Micheal Bolton	Safe
Banty	4	"Greatest Love Of All" by Whitney Houston	Safe
Faith	5	"Charlie" by Simi	Safe
Jordan	6	"This Is Me" from The Greatest Showman	Safe
Debby	7	"My Heart Will Go On" by Celine Dion	Eliminated
Progress	8	"I need An Angel" by Ruben Studdard	Safe

- Yinka Daives was a guest judge of this live show.

=== Top 7: Showstopper (17 April) ===
Act	Order	Song	Result
David Opera	1	"Wonderful" by Burna Boy	Eliminated
Banty	2	"Finesse" by Jon Bruno Mars	Safe
Zadok	3	"I Wanna Dance With Somebody" by Whitney Houston	Safe
Progress	4	"Bang Bang" by Ariana Grande	Safe
Jordan	5	"Titanium" by David Guetta ft Sia	Safe
Faith	6	"Koroba" by Tiwa Savage	Safe
Itohan	7	"Only Girl (In The World)" by Rihanna	Safe

- Ice Prince was a guest judge of this live show.

=== Top 6 (24 April) ===
Act	Order	Song	Result
Jordan	1	"Anybody" by Burna Boy	Safe
Banty	2	"Love Don't Cost A Dime" by Jon Magixx	Safe
Itohan	3	"Na Gode" by Yemi Alade	Eliminated
Zadok	4	"Laye" by Kizz Daniel	Safe
Faith	5	"Emiliana" by Ckay	Eliminated
Progress	6	"Bloody Samaritan" from Ayra Starr	Safe

- Fommer winner Kingdom and 2nd runner up were guest performers.

=== Top 4 (1 May) ===
Act	Order	Song	Result
Progress	1	"Wait for Me" by Johnny Driller	Safe
Jordan	2	"Airplane Mode " by Fireboy	Eliminated
Zadok	3	"The Vow" by Timi Dakolo	Safe
Banty	4	"Babanke" by Asa	Safe

== Finalists ==
(ages stated at time of contest)

Contestant	Age	Hometown	Gender
Gerald	28	Anambra State	Male
Abigail	28	Bayelsa State	Female
Jordan	22	Kaduna State	Male
Itohan	17	Edo State	Female
Banty	26	Warri	Female
David Operah	30	Lagos	Male
Zadok	27	Edo State	Male
Faith	22	Delta State	Female
Progress	21	Delta State	Male
Debby	25	Benin City	Female
Precious	25	Bayelsa State	Female
Joel	23	Abia State	Male
