= The Beatz Awards =

Nigerian music awards show

- Current: The Beatz Awards 2024
- Awarded for: Outstanding achievements of creatives working behind the scenes in the Nigerian Music production, distribution and Business Space.
- Country: Nigeria
- First award: November 13, 2015; 11 years ago
- Website: www.thebeatzawards.com

Television/radio coverage
- Network: MTVBase; Silverbird Television; Nigezie Xtreme; wapTV; Television Continental; BEN Television

The Beatz Awards is a Nigerian awards music show first introduced on 13 November 2015, by Eliworld Int'l Limited, to recognize and celebrate outstanding achievements of the creative minds behind the music production, business, and distribution.

== History ==
The event is composed of 31 categories and the 1st edition of The Beatz Awards was held on 17 December 2015, at Shell Hall, Muson Center, Onikan, Victoria Island, Lagos, with host Gordons, and Angel Ufuoma. Winners of the ceremony include Cobhams Asuquo, Masterkraft, Legendury Beatz, Don Jazzy, DJ Jimmy Jatt, Ubi Franklin, Clarence Peters, Kaffy, among other.

On 17 November 2019, The Beatz honoured Don Jazzy, with the Lifetime Achievement Award. During the ceremony, the New Discovery Producer category was renamed to Don Jazzy New Discovery Producer. On 8 December 2019, Don Jazzy promised 1 million naira prize to the winner of 6th edition of Don Jazzy New Discovery Producer. On 30 December 2020, The Beatz Awards held a pre-event of the 6th edition of the ceremony titled The Beatz Awards 20 for 20, to celebrate 20 biggest records of 2020.

The Beatz Awards 2023 announced the nominees for the 2023 edition.

== Ceremonies ==
#	Date	Venue	Host city	Host
1st	17 December 2015	Shell Hall, Muson Center, Onikan, Victoria Island	Lagos	Gordons; Angel Ufuoma
2nd	17 December 2016	Shell Hall, Muson Center, Onikan, Victoria Island	Lagos	Seyi Law; Angel Ufuoma
3rd	16 December 2017	Shell Hall, Muson Center, Onikan, Victoria Island	Lagos	Laff Up; Angel Ufuoma
4th	21 November 2018	Shell Hall, Muson Center, Onikan, Victoria Island	Lagos	Kenny Blaq
5th	17 November 2019	Shell Hall, Muson Center, Onikan, Victoria Island	Lagos	Dr SID
6th	28 November 2021	Shell Hall, Muson Center, Onikan, Victoria Island	Lagos	Victory Wilson; Saco
7th	19 November 2022	Shell Hall, Muson Center, Onikan, Victoria Island	Lagos	Damola; Phronesis; Dee-One; Saco
8th	18 November 2023	Shell Hall, Muson Center, Onikan, Victoria Island	Lagos	Forever; Alexis Ukpabi
