= Mairo Ese =

Nigerian gospel singer (born 1982)

- Born: Oghenemairo Okechukwu Ese; May 27, 1982 (age 44); Lagos State
- Origin: Delta State, Nigeria
- Occupations: Singer; songwriter; worship leader
- Instrument: Vocals
- Years active: 2005–present
- Spouse: Ayo Mairo-Ese

Oghenemairo Okechukwu Ese (born 27 May 1982) popularly known as Mairo Ese is a Nigerian songwriter and gospel singer. He is well known for the hit singles “Nani Gi” and “You Are The Reason”. He released his first album “Worship of Yahweh” in 2015.

== Biography ==
Mairo Ese was born on 27 May 1982 to Mr and Mrs Ese in Lagos State, Nigeria. He hails from Isoko South Local Government Area, Delta State.

== Career ==
Mairo Ese's musical journey dates back to 1998 when he joined the choir for the first time. He served as a worship leader and music director in Redeemed Christian Church of God and House on The Rock, Jos.

His music career officially started in 2005 with the release of his first single "We Praise You". In 2014, he released another single "You Are The Reason"

In September 2015, he debuted his first album "Worship of Yahweh" which comprised 10 tracks including "Ole Hallelujah" featuring Nathaniel Bassey, "Nani Gi" and "Come boldly". His sophomore album “Spirit and Life” was released in September 2020 and comprised 12 tracks.

In June 2022, he started a music project "The Equipping (Tongues and Chants)" which was a live recording to help people pray and chant in tongues for an hour. He has collaborated with several gospel artists like Nathaniel Bassey, Nosa, TY Bello among others.

== Discography ==
=== Albums ===
Year	Title	Details	Ref
2015	Worship of Yahweh	No. of Tracks: 10; Format: Digital download, streaming	
2020	Spirit and Life	No. of Tracks: 12; Format: Digital download, streaming	

=== Singles ===
- "You Are The Reason" (2014)
- "Nani Gi" (2015)
- "Everlasting" (2017)
- "Ole Halleluyah" featuring Nathaniel Bassey
- "The Only God" (2017)
- "Hold to His Hand" (2020)
- "Manifest" (2020)

== Personal life ==
Mairo Ese got engaged to Nigerian media personality Ayo Thompson in May 2017. They had their wedding ceremony in November, that same year.

== Awards and nominations ==
Year	Organization	Awards	Recipient	Result	Ref
2016	The Beatz Awards	Best Afro Gospel Producer by Rotimi Keys	"Nani Gi"	Won	

== See also ==
List of Nigerian gospel musicians
