= Super C Season =

Studio album by Naeto C
- Released: February 7, 2011
- Recorded: 2009–2010
- Genre: Hip hop
- Length: 67:00
- Label: Storm 360, Cerious Music
- Producer: Obi Asika (exec.), Olisa Adibua (exec.), Tola Odunsi(exec.) Naeto C (co-exec.), Ty Mix, Dokta Frabz, Ikon, Terry G, Sarz

Naeto C chronology
U Know My "P" (2008)	Super C Season (2011)

Singles from Super C Season
- 1. "Ako Mi Ti Poju" Released: September 8, 2009; 2. "Duro" Released: November 20, 2009; 3. "Ten Over Ten" Released: August 16, 2010; 4. "Share My Blessings" Released: January 1, 2011

Super C Season is the second studio album by Nigerian rap artist, Naeto C. It was released on February 7, 2011, and is available for download on iTunes.

== Singles ==
The album has spawned four singles. The first single "Ako Mi Ti Poju" was released on September 8, 2009. Although the version released features simply the rapper, the version of the song seen on the album is an extended version, which features late Nigerian rapper "Dagrin". The song "Duro", which features artist "YQ", is the second single off the album and it was released on November 20, 2009. The track is an up-tempo party song which has Naeto C delivering three different verses and YQ lending his voice to sing the chorus. The third single released off the album "Ten over Ten" was released on August 16, 2010. It is like the latter an up-tempo party track but this time sees the rapper delivering his verses but as well singing its chorus. The fourth and final single off the album "Share My Blessings" was released on January 1, 2011 via the rapper's Twitter page with the rapper tweeting "Exclusively for my friends & fans: Be the 1st to Listen, download and share my Brand New Single featuring ASA...". It features Nigerian born soul singer "Aṣa" who lends her voice to sing the chorus of the song. The song was made available on the rapper's label "Storm360"'s 4shared account, and has so far been downloaded over 10,000 times since its release.

== Accolades ==
Super C Season was nominated for "Best Rap Album" and "Album of the Year" at the 2012 edition of The Headies.

Year	Awards ceremony	Award description(s)	Results
2012	The Headies	Album of the Year	Nominated
2012	The Headies	Best Rap Album	Nominated

== Track listing ==
The official track listing was confirmed by the rapper also via his Twitter page.

No.	Title	Producer(s)	Length
1.	"Super C Season"	Sarz	3:39
2.	"True(dem no fit do am)" (featuring Omawumi)	Dokta Frabz	3:59
3.	"Ako Mi Ti Poju (Extended Mix)" (featuring Da Grin)	Dokta Frabz	4:30
4.	"Carry your Shoulder"	Ikon	4:00
5.	"Ex-Girlfriend" (featuring Dokta Frabz)	Dokta Frabz, TY-Mix	4:16
6.	"Skimpololo" (featuring Terry G)	Terry G	3:46
7.	"Duro" (featuring YQ)	Dokta Frabz, Ty Mix	3:30
8.	"Afuru'm gi nanya (I luv u)" (featuring Waje)	Ty Mix	3:32
9.	"5 and 6"	Ty Mix	4:09
10.	"Ten Over Ten"	Ty Mix	3:38
11.	"Deja Vu (Our Drinks)"	Ty Mix	4:13
12.	"Share my Blessings" (featuring Aṣa)	Sarz	4:09
13.	"Voodoo"	Ty Mix	3:56
14.	"C me finish"	Ty Mix	3:40

== Personnel ==
Credits adapted from Genius, Muso.Ai & Tidal

Technical

- TY Mix – Recording, Mixing
- Dokta Frabz - Recording, Mixing, Mastering
