= Levi Chibuike Ajuonuma =

Nigerian journalist (1959–2012)

- Born: 2 December 1959; Enugu State
- Died: 3 June 2012 (aged 52); Lagos State
- Education: Huntington College, Indiana; University of Minnesota; Plymouth State College
- Occupations: Media professional, broadcaster
- Employer: NNPC
- Spouse: Josephine Ajuonuma
- Children: DJ Obi, Amy (MIMI),

Levi Chibuike Ajuonuma (2 December 1959 – 3 June 2012), known as Livi, was a Nigerian academic, journalist and public relations expert. He was a radio broadcaster and TV presenter in Nigeria, best known for hosting a Saturday night entertainment programme "Open House Party" in Raypower 100.5 FM. Ajuonuma also worked at the Nigerian Television Authority (NTA) and other channels, where he was the host and executive producer of The Sunday Show, Showtime and Levi Ajuonuma Live.

== Early life ==
Ajuonuma was a native of Ideato South in Imo State but was born in Enugu State where he grew up and had his early education. He traveled to the United States in 1979 to further his education and received a BA in Communications from Huntington College, Indiana; an MA and PhD in Mass Communications from the University of Minnesota in 1983 and 1987 respectively; and an MBA from Plymouth State University in 1989.

== Career ==
Ajuonuma started his career as a media professional in 1977 with the Imo Broadcasting Service (IBS) in Owerri, Imo State. He left Nigeria to further his studies in mass communications in United States, where he graduated with a BA, MA and PhD in that field. Before returning to Nigeria after his studies in the US, Ajuonuma was briefly tenured as Assistant Professor of Journalism with the Department of Journalism at Keene State College of the University System of New Hampshire. He returned back to Nigeria to continue his career in broadcasting and journalism as a broadcaster in several Radio and TV Stations in Nigeria. He later on worked as the Group General Manager, Corporate Affairs of the Nigerian National Petroleum Corporation (NNPC) where he remained till his death.

== Personal life ==
Ajuonuma was married to Josephine Ajuonuma and they have eight children together.

== Death and Afterward ==
Ajuonuma was one of the four NNPC staff who lost their lives on 3 June 2012 in the Dana Air Flight 992 crash at Iju-Ishaga of Lagos State. Former Nigerian Minister of Petroleum Resources Diezani Alison-Madueke paid an official emotional tribute to Ajuonuma at a memorial "Service of Songs" (wake) held in his honour. Ajuonuma was laid to rest in his home town in Imo State, and was survived by his wife Josephine Ajuonuma and his eight children (four boys and four girls).
