= City Mall, Lagos =

Shopping centre in Onikan, Lagos

The Lagos City Mall is a modern shopping centre located in Onikan, Lagos Island. It is in proximity to many prominent Lagos landmarks such as the Muson Centre, the Tafawa Balewa Square, Onikan Stadium, the National Museum and the Radisson Blu Anchorage Hotel, Victoria Island.

Facilities at the City Mall in Lagos include:

- 50 shops, including designer and high street boutiques.
- Three restaurants on the second floor.
- Children's play area.
- Two cinemas, all on the second floor.
- Central air-conditioning system.
- Parking for about 300 cars.

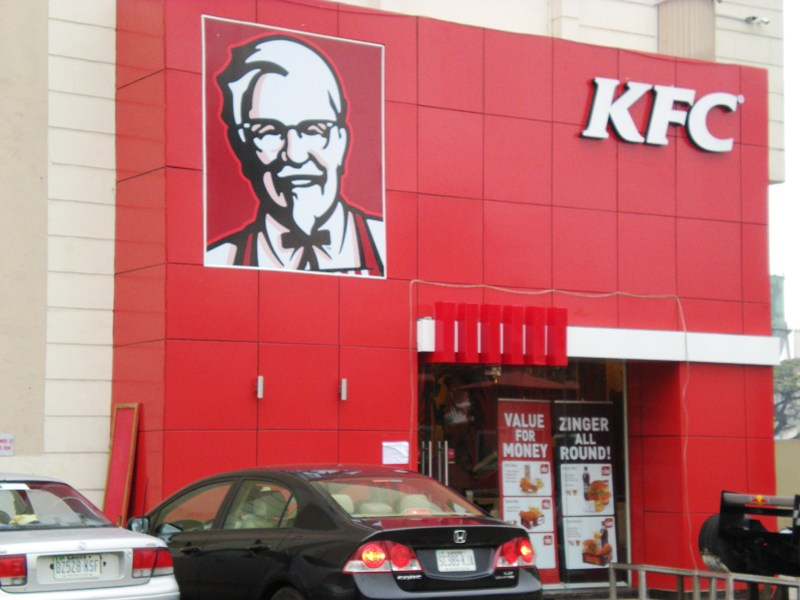
KFC inside the city Mall
