= Nigerian Idol =

- Created by: Simon Fuller
- Presented by: Tiwa Savage & IllRymz (Season 2); Anis Holloway and Misi Holloway (Season 3 - Season 4); IK Osakioduwa (Season 5 - Season 10)
- Judges: Jeffrey Daniel (Season 1); Yinka Davies (Season 1 - Season 5); Audu Maikori (Season 1); Charly Boy (Season 2); Femi Kuti (Season 3); Naeto C (Season 3); Darey (Season 4 - Season 5); Nneka (Season 4); Dede Mabiaku (Season 4 - Season 5); Obi Asika (Season 6 - Season 8); Seyi Shay (Season 6); DJ Sose (Season 6); Dbanj (Season 7 - Season 8); Simi (Season 7 - Season 8); Toolz (Season 7); Omawumi (Season 7, Season 9 - Season 10); Ric Hassani (Season 9 - Season 10); 9ice (Season 9); Iyanya (Season 10)
- Country of origin: Nigeria
- Original language: English
- No. of seasons: 10

Production
- Running time: 60-120 min.

Original release
- Network: Africa Magic Showcase; Africa Magic Family
- Release: 2010 – present

Nigerian Idol is the Nigerian version of the Idol series franchise. It is the second Idol franchise for the country as it was already part of Idols West Africa which was also shot and produced in Stockholm, Sweden.

The show started with its first season in 2010, the 50th anniversary of the country with the tagline Live Your Dream. Accept No Limitation.

Auditions were open for every Nigerian between 18 and 28. The first season went on air in October 2010 and is shown on 15 different channels all across Africa.

On March 27, 2011, 26-year-old Onyekachi Elizabeth Gilbert Onwuka aka "yeka onka" from Ohafia was announced the first Nigerian Idol ever over fellow competitor Naomi Ebiama. Onyekachi was awarded the sum of 7.5 Million Naira, a recording contract with Sony, a car and an all-expense-paid trip to South Africa. Prior of receiving a Golden Ticket in Lagos Yeka unsuccessfully auditioned on two other occasions for the show. For the creation of the winning song the two finalists collaborated with award-winning producer Jesse Jagz. Yeka has since performed in different world know stages and started the first female band known as the "Gfactor band" in Nigeria.

In Season 4, Evelyn Ibhade Zibili, professionally known as "Evelle," was announced the winner of Nigerian Idol in 2014. After winning Nigerian Idol in 2014, Evelle released 'Waiting,' featuring DJ Xclusive and Masterkraft, marking her official entry into Nigeria's music industry.

There have been nine following Nigerian Idol winners to date: Onyekachi Elizabeth Gilbert, Mercy Chinwo, Moses Obi Adigwe, Evelle, K-Peace, Kingdom Kroseide, Progress, Victory Gbakara and Chima Udoye.

== Judges and hosts ==
=== Judges ===
For season one, Yinka Davies, Audu Maikori and Jeffrey Daniel were selected to be the judges. In season two, Maikori was replaced with Charly Boy as a judge. In season three, Femi Kuti replaced Charly. In season four, Darey, Nneka, and Dede Mabiaku were selected as judges. In season five, Yinka Davies replaced Nneka. In season six, Obi Asika, Seyi Shay and DJ Sose were selected to be the judges with IK Osakioduwa serving as host. In season 7, Simi, D’banj, Yinka Davies and Obi Asoka were stipulated to be judges. In Season 9 Omawumi, Ric Hassani and 9ice were chosen to be the judges.

== Season 1 ==
The show was hosted by Misi and Anis Holloway and the panel of judges consists of producer and record label owner Audu Maikori, former Shalamar singer/dancer Jeffrey Daniel, and singer Yinka Davies.

=== Elimination chart ===
Legend
Did Not Perform	Female	Male	Top 50	Wild Card	Top 10	Winner

Safe	Safe First	Safe Last	Eliminated

Stage:		Semi					Wild; Card	Finals							
Week:		12/23	12/30	1/6	1/13	1/20	1/27	2/3	2/10	2/17	2/24	3/3	3/10	3/17	3/27
Place	Contestant	Result													
1	Onyekachi Elizabeth Gilbert					2nd		Btm 3	Btm 4	Btm 3		Btm 2	Btm 2		Winner(51%)
2	Naomi Ebiama	1st													Runner-Up(49%)
3	Emmanuel Patrick				2nd					Btm 4	Btm 4	Btm 3		Elim	
4	Bello Lydia Biodum		1st										Elim		
5	Glory Orishki		2nd								Btm 3	Elim			
6-7	Alex Olori					3rd			Btm 4		Elim				
6-7	Zoe Chinaka			1st							Elim				
8-9	Oluwatoni Afolayan					Elim	Saved	Btm 4		Elim					
8-9	George Ukeme			2nd						Elim					
10-11	Ajumoke Nwaeze			Elim			Saved		Elim						
10-11	Chito Ann Akwueh	Elim					Saved		Elim						
12-13	Kalu-Ude Nnenna				1st			Elim							
12-13	Olamide Etti	2nd						Elim							
14	Ken Nwaoji					1st	Wdrw								
Wild; Card	Rachel Tamunokuro Ogonodi				Elim		Elim								
Wild; Card	Amadi Lawrence		Elim				Elim								
Wild; Card	Immaculate Edache	Elim					Elim								
Wild; Card	Irene Ojarigho	Elim					Elim								
Semi- Final 5	Amy					Elim									
Semi- Final 5	Bibi					Elim									
Semi- Final 5	Funmi					Elim									
Semi- Final 5	Kemi					Elim									
Semi- Final 5	Thoinette					Elim									
Semi- Final 4	Adetoun Adekoya Grace				Elim										
Semi- Final 4	Anthony Nsikak Akpan				Elim										
Semi- Final 4	Chioma Success Ezeh				Elim										
Semi- Final 4	Ewoma Egedi				Elim										
Semi- Final 4	Ndidiamaka Percious Okonkwo				Elim										
Semi- Final 4	Obiala Leonard Chinyere				Elim										
Semi- Final 3	Chukwudi Victor Okwege			Elim											
Semi- Final 3	Faith Dode			Elim											
Semi- Final 3	Godson Chimew Godson			Elim											
Semi- Final 3	Grace Udoh			Elim											
Semi- Final 3	Jessica Sunny			Elim											
Semi- Final 3	Olajumoke Rachael Oyebodejo			Elim											
Semi- Final 3	Toyosi Alasi			Elim											
Semi- Final 2	Domita Ojeme Abodo		Elim												
Semi- Final 2	Felicia Ugoaro		Elim												
Semi- Final 2	Lawrence Paul		Elim												
Semi- Final 2	Lynn Eke		Elim												
Semi- Final 2	Onyekachukwu Nwaligbe		Elim												
Semi- Final 2	Safiya Ramat Idachaba		Elim												
Semi- Final 2	Sunday Onyeka Otabo		Elim												
Semi- Final 1	Abraham Emurewa	Elim													
Semi- Final 1	Joe Ekpo	Elim													
Semi- Final 1	Ogunbodede "Bukky" Oluwabukola	Elim													
Semi- Final 1	Ruth Nwachukwu	Elim													
Semi- Final 1	Sadia Ibrahim	Elim													

== Season 2 ==
In 2012, singer Charly Boy replaced Audu Maikori who left the show to concentrate on other projects. The hosts were Tiwa Savage and IllRymz. The contestants were Chinedu, Najita, Nikki, Lynda, Ibinabo, Honey, Diwari, A.Y.O, Mercy, Steven Onochie, Anthony Ekpo and Sly 1 (Sylvester Kingston). Mercy Chinwo was the eventual winner.

== Season 6 ==
Nigerian Idol
- Hosted by: IK Osakioduwa
- Judges: Obi Asika; Seyi Shay; DJ Sose
- Winner: Kingdom Kroseide
- Runner-up: Francis Atela
- Finals venue: Africa Magic Studios

Release
- Original network: Africa Magic
- Original release: March 14 – July 11, 2021

After a five-year hiatus, Nigerian Idol was picked up by Multichoice and sponsored by Tecno Mobile and Bigi Drinks and began airing in 2021. Obi Asika, Seyi Shay and DJ Sose were selected as judges for the season. The show was hosted by veteran host IK Osakioduwa.

Through a series of auditions, a controversial top 11 was picked by the judges. This deviated from the usual top 10 format that was meant to be used in the selection. This act stirred up a lot of conversation on Nigerian social media space.

The Top 11 included Kingdom Kroseide, Clinton, Atela Francis, Akunna, Comfort Alalade, Beyoncé Ajomiwe, Daniel Ikechi, Faith Mac, Faith Jason, Dotun Deloye and Eljay. The contestants finished in the following positions. 1st.Kingdom, 2nd.Francis, 3rd.Akunna, 4th.Comfort, 5th.Faith Jason, 6th.Emmanuel, 7th.Beyonce, 8th.Daniel, 9th.Clinton, 1O&11.Faith Mac & Dotun. Because of the COVID-19 pandemic, the live shows didn't have human audiences and used applause tracks instead.

For the top 5, top 4 and top 3 live shows, guest judges were brought in to evaluate the contestants. The guest judges included Mr P, Praiz and Cobhams Asuquo respectively.

In July 2021, Kingdom Kroseide emerged winner in what is said to be the most emotional Nigerian Idol finale ever. Kroseide was declared winner over his fellow Top 2 contestant, Atela Francis.

Kroseide was given a prize money of 30 million Naira, A brand new SUV, All expense paid trips to Dubai and Seychelles, a recording contract, a one-year supply of Bigi Drinks and much more.

== Season 10 ==
Nigerian idol season 10 kickstarted on April 20, 2025. With the theme, “Your Voice, Your Victory,”singer Iyanya was introduced as a new judge.

== Awards and nominations ==
Year	Award	Category	Result	Ref
2021	Net Honours	Most Popular Event	Nominated	

== See also ==
- Nigeria's Got Talent
- Project Fame
- The Voice Nigeria
