= Asa Asika =

Nigerian talent manager

- Born: Asa Asika; 14 August 1990 (age 36); Lagos State, Nigeria
- Education: White Sands School
- Occupations: Talent manager; A&R executive; Promoter; Record executive
- Years active: 2012–present
- Known for: Plug Entertainment
- Board member of: The Plug

Asa Asika (born 14 August 1990) is a Nigerian talent manager, best known as Davido's manager, also the co-founder of The Plug (subsidiaries; Plug Entertainment, Plug Live, The Plug Music, Plug Films, Plug Publishing, and Plug Sports) and The Block Party Series.

== Early life ==
Asa Asika was born on 14 August 1990, and is the oldest of three siblings. His mother died when he was seven years old.

== Career ==
Asika began his career at Storm 360, working at shows for Obi Asika, when he was sixteen, until 2012, when his uncle, and Olisa Adibua ended their partnership. At Storm 360, he worked with Ikechukwu, ELDee, Sasha P, Naeto C, and became talent manager to YQ, and other clients including R2Bees and Davido. In 2013, he founded his entertainment management company, StarGaze Management Company, after he split with Davido. In 2014, he signed Naeto C, Boj, a member of the musical group DRB LasGidi, and Ayo Jay, to StarGaze Management Company. In 2016, he founded The Plug Entertainment (aka The Plug), a management firm. In 2017, he became Davido's manager again, under The Plug Entertainment. He won Artiste Manager of the Year at The Beatz Awards 2019, and 2018 City People Music Awards. On 22 March 2021, he received multiple plaques from RIAA for Davido, and Ayo Jay.

== Personal life ==
He is the nephew of Obi Asika, and cousin to Naeto C. In January 2018, his relationship with Cuppy became public, and ended in 2020.

== Awards and nominations ==
Year	Award	Category	Recipient	Result
2017	City People Music Awards	Music Manager of the Year	Himself	Nominated
2017	The Beatz Awards	Artiste Manager of the Year	Himself	Nominated
2018	City People Music Awards	Artiste Manager of the Year	Himself	Won
2018	Maya Awards (Africa)	Entertainment Personality	Himself	Nominated
2019	The Beatz Awards	Artiste Manager of the Year	Himself	Won
2019	African Entertainment Awards USA	Best African Talent/Artist Managers	Himself	Nominated
2021	The Beatz Awards	Best Artist Manager of the Year	Himself	Nominated
2021	Muzikol Music Awards	Best African Artist Manager	Himself	Nominated
2022	The Beatz Awards	Artiste Manager of the Year	Himself	Nominated
