= Ukpabi Asika =

Nigerian academic and civil servant (1936–2004)

Administrator of East Central State
- In office 28 October 1967 – July 1975
- Preceded by: Lt. Col Chukwuemeka Odumegwu Ojukwu
- Succeeded by: Anthony Ochefu

Personal details
- Born: 28 June 1936 Onitsha, Anambra State, Nigeria
- Died: 14 September 2004 (aged 68) Abuja, Nigeria

Anthony Ukpabi Asika (28 June 1936 – 14 September 2004) was a Nigerian academic and civil servant. He served as the Administrator of East Central State during the military regime of General Yakubu Gowon, appointed when his predecessor, the Eastern Region governor Chukwuemeka Odumegwu Ojukwu, led the Biafran state into secession.

== Background ==
Asika was born in Onitsha in modern-day Anambra State on 28 June 1936. His father was Edward Obiozo Asika of the Ijelekpe Dynasty in Ogbeoza Village, Onitsha. He was educated at Methodist College Uzuakoli in Abia State, Calabar, Edo College and University College, now the University of Ibadan. He worked as Clerk of Onitsha Town Council (1953), Clerk in the Department of Marketing and Export, Lagos, Clerk at the Northern Nigeria Marketing Board, Kano. Asika studied at the University of California, Berkeley in the US from 1961 to 1965 and then became a lecturer in Political Science at the University of Ibadan between 1965 and 1967. He was an erudite scholar.

== Administrator of East Central State ==
Asika was appointed administrator of East-Central State in October 1967 at the start of the Biafran civil war, theoretically based in Enugu which in fact was the capital of the breakaway state. Biafran radio used the nickname "Lord Haw Haw" for Asika, who was a pro-federal Igbo intellectual. After the war ended in 1970 he was responsible for administering a large part of the former Biafran territories. His administration was said to be starved of funds. He was strongly opposed to the creation of new states. While governor, he was also a member of the Technical Committee on the Review of the National Census from 1973 to 1975.

== Later career ==
Asika later was Team Leader of the Presidential Delegation to Niger, Chad and Cameroun which negotiated re-opening Nigeria borders in 1985. Asika suffered a stroke in 1996, requiring extensive medical care, and was incapacitated from then on. He died on 14 September 2004.

Asika was married to late Chief Mrs. Chinyere Asika, and the couple had three children: Obi, Nkiru and Uju.
