= Rainbow College =

Educational institution in Nigeria

- Formation: 1996

Rainbow College was founded in 1996 in Nigeria. It is located at km 39 Lagos/Ibadan expressway, Ogun State. It serves to prepare boys and girls for additional education either at a university in Nigeria or elsewhere in the world. It is a college that offers educational programmes for students of all nationalities.

Academic education in the college takes six years and is made up of three years in Junior Secondary School followed by three years in Senior Secondary School. Some of the languages offered at Rainbow college include English language, French language, Yoruba language, and Igbo language.

Senior Secondary School focuses preparation on three main examinations: the West African Senior School Certificate Examination (WASSCE), the National Examination Council (Nigeria) (NECO) Senior School Certificate Examination (SSCE), and the International General Certificate of Secondary Education (IGCSE). Additionally students are prepared for the Test of English as a Foreign Language (TOEFL), the SAT Reasoning Test (SAT), the University Matriculation Examination (UME) Joint Admissions and Matriculation Board (JAMB) and the Cambridge Examinations..
