= Kolawole Olawuyi =

Investigative journalist, broadcaster, and storyteller (1963–2007)

- Born: 1963
- Died: March 3, 2007 (aged 43–44)
- Citizenship: Nigerian
- Education: The Polytechnic Ibadan
- Occupation: Investigative Journalist
- Known for: Nkan Mbe

Kóláwole Oláwuyi (1963 – March 3, 2007) was an investigative journalist, broadcaster, and storyteller.

== Early life and education ==
Olawuyi was raised in Ibadan, southwest Nigeria, the son of Williams Inaolaji Olawuyi and Alhaja Olawuyi. He attended The Polytechnic Ibadan to study mass communication. He was about to wrap up his Masters program in Communication Arts at the University of Ibadan before his death.

== Career ==
Olawuyi started his media career at the Federal Radio Corporation of Nigeria, where he created an unprecedented radio program, Ìrírí Ayé, Irinkerindo Akolawole in 1992, the program showcased a whole new perspective on human stories and challenges, unraveling 'strange but true' mystery stories.

The program has wide viewership with the story of Okorocha, and Malaika Agba, however, the show received backlash as the show became unaccepted at FRCN. This incident led him to pioneer Kolbim Communications, an independent communication company for which he created 'Nnkan Nbe', the audio-visual version of the show on Ogun State Broadcasting Corporation, OGBC, Abeokuta, and later Galaxy Television, Lagos. He held on to the program until his death.

== Mystery and controversy ==
Although Olawuyi was not an everyday broadcaster, his program was unique in many respects. Aimed at exposing the mysterious activities of evil men and women in society, especially in the South West, where he got them aired on many TV and radio stations. According to Premium Times, in the 1990s he ran a series on 'Nkan Mbe' where he spoke to several former backroom staff and members of TB Joshua's SCOAN, "who revealed all manners of alleged atrocities, including occultism at the church."

Different views have been expressed concerning the real cause of Olawuyi's death. Some claim he fell ill three months, prior to his death while others claim his death was a result of a story he exposed concerning a ghost town in Benin Republic. He was believed to belong to a powerful cult in which he consistently denied his involvement.

== See also ==
- Galaxy Television (Nigeria)
- TB Joshua
