= Kenny Blaq =

Nigerian stand-up comedian and singer

- Born: Otolorin Kehinde Peter; September 30, 1992 (age 33)
- Education: Federal Radio Corporation of Nigeria Training School, Ikeja, Lagos
- Years active: 2008–present
- Website: kennyblaq.com

Otolorin Kehinde Peter, performing as Kenny Blaq, is a Nigerian stand-up comedian and singer. He performed at the 2nd edition of Unlock Naija Independence celebration and Africa Magic Owambe Finale.

== Early life ==
Kenny Blaq completed his primary and secondary education in Ejigbo, Lagos. He left SS3 to attend a tutorial centre where he sat his [[West African Senior School Certificate Examination|WASSCE]] examination after his parents were unable to meet the school fees.

He trained as a compere and presenter at the [[Federal Radio Corporation of Nigeria|FRCN]] training school in Lagos, having previously worked with SMA FM, a college community-based radio station.

== Career ==
Blaq started his comedy career in 2008, and has performed at comedy events within and outside Nigeria including I Laff with Mc Abbey, Gbenga Adeyinka (Laffmattaz), Ali Baba's January 1st Concert, Mc Amana's (DiSpeakable Me), Cool FM Praise JAM, DAREY's Love Like A Movie, AY LIVE, Basketmouth's Lord of the Ribs, Africa Laughs (Uganda), SEKA Live (Rwanda), ECOFEST (Sierra Leone) and Benin Glo Laffta Fest (Nigeria).

His self-titled comedy concert The Oxymoron of Kenny Blaq won Best Comedy Show at the 2017 and 2018 Naija 102.3 FM Comedy Awards during its three-year run.

Blaq's first internationally headlined event was staged at the Indigo O2 on 30 September 2018, titled Kenny Blaq: State of Mind, in partnership with SMADE, a UK-based international show promoter. He subsequently appeared as a headliner at the Indaba X: The Laughing Leopard comedy event at Royal Festival Hall.

Blaq was listed in 2018 among the 100 most influential youths in Africa, after receiving The Future Awards Africa prize for comedy in 2017. In 2020, he received the Ooni Youth Royal Award.

In 2020, Blaq began a nationwide tour, starting at Federal University of Technology Owerri in Imo State and continuing to [[Obafemi Awolowo University]] in Ile-Ife. The tour was interrupted by the COVID-19 pandemic. A concert at the Obafemi Awolowo University Amphitheatre was reported to have been attended by over 5,000 people. The tour concluded in December in Abuja. In 2021, Blaq undertook a 12-city tour of the United Kingdom with promoter Akinlolu Jenkins.

On 17 November 2021, a comedy special recorded by Blaq in Lagos debuted on Netflix, described as the first comedy production by a Nigeria-based comedian to be featured on the platform.

== Awards ==
Year	Awards	Categories
2015	Naija FM Comedy Awards	Upcoming Comedian of the Year
2016	MEAMA Awards	Best Comedy Act, Nigeria
2016	Naija FM Comedy Awards	Best Comedian of The Year
2017	The Future Awards Africa	Comedy
2017	Naija FM Comedy Awards	Best Comedy Show Comedian of The Year
2018	Naija FM Comedy Awards	Comedian of the Year
2018	Naija FM Comedy Awards	Best Comedy Show
2018	Naija FM Comedy Awards	Most Fashionable Comedian
2019	Naija FM Comedy Awards	Most Fashionable Comedian
2019	MAYA Awards	Comedian of The Year (Stand Up)
2021	Humor Awards	Best Music Comedian
