= Tjan (musician) =

- Born: Olasunmbo Tijani Fowosere; 21 February 1992 (age 34); Isale Eko, Lagos, Nigeria
- Genres: Afropop; R&B
- Occupations: Singer; songwriter; performer
- Years active: 2014–present

Olasunmbo Tijani Fowosere (born February 21, 1992) professionally known as Tjan is a Nigerian singer, songwriter and recording artiste. He attained national recognition with the release of his 2016 hit single “Aduke” produced by Cobhams Asuquo. He has received several notable award nominations, including the 2017 COSON Song Awards, the Nigerian Music Video Awards (NMVA) as well as the 2016 Headies Awards.

== Early life ==
Tjan was born in Isale Eko, Lagos State southwest Nigeria on February 21, 1992. He has four siblings, one of whom is a Rapper and his love for poetry was honed by his father, himself a Poet. Tjan began writing music at the age of 14 and at 17 he had recorded and released his debut single “What You Like”. He studied Music and Vocal Training at the Music Society of Nigeria (MUSON) School of Music after which he went on to the North American University Houdegbe, Benin Republic, from where he graduated with a degree in mass communications in 2013. While at the university, he made it to the top 20 of the season 3 of the Nigerian Idol competition.

== Career ==
In 2013, after graduating from University, Tjan attended his compulsory National Youth Service Corps (NSYC) programme in Delta State, during which time, he competed for and won the Airtel Music Competition.

In 2014, he signed a record deal with the newly registered, Right Entertainment, under whose imprint he released his official professional debut single “I love You so”. He followed this with the release of other singles in 2015 including, “Hey Mama” (dedicated to his mother's love), “Temi”, “I Love you so (Remix)” (featuring Reminisce), and “Ire”. It was however the release of the single “Aduke” produced by Cobhams Asuquo, in 2016 that afforded him national attention and recognition. Aduke earned Tjan a Headies Awards nomination in 2016 for Best R&B Single and in 2017, Tjan took home the Best Love Song of the Year Award at the 2017 COSON Song Awards.

Following the success of Aduke, he reunited with Cobhams Asuquo on the production of another single “Meji” featuring Ycee in late 2016, the video for Meji was directed by Clarence Peters and has over 1 million views on YouTube. In 2017, Tjan released the singles “Your Smile” and “Omoyi”, which enjoyed rave reviews and in February 2018, he collaborated with afrobeats artiste, Mayorkun on the single “Sotey”.

== Awards and recognition ==
Year	Event	Prize	Recipient	Result
2015	Nigerian Entertainment Awards	Most Promising Act	"Tjan"	Nominated
2015	Nigerian Music Video Awards	Best Afrobeat Video	Love You So (Remix)	Nominated
2016	Top Naija Music Awards	Artiste of the Year	Tjan	Nominated
2016	Headies	R&B Song of the Year	Aduke	Nominated
2016	Nigerian Music Video Awards	Best R&B Video	Aduke	Nominated
2017	COSON Song Awards	Love Song of the Year	"Aduke"	Won

== Discography ==
- I love You so (2015)
- Hey Mama (2015)
- Temi (2015)
- Ire (2015)
- I love you so (remix) featuring Reminisce (2015)
- Aduke (2016)
- Meji featuring Ycee (2016)
- Your Smile (2017)
- Omoyi (2017)
- Sotey featuring Mayorkun (2018)
- Future in Your Eyes (2018)
