= DJ Obi =

Nigerian DJ

- Born: Obinna Levi Ajuonuma; 29 April 1985 (age 41); Lagos, Nigeria
- Education: Worcester State University
- Occupation: Disc jockey
- Employer: Syndik8 Records

Obinna Levi Ajuonuma (born 29 April 1985), professionally known as DJ Obi, is a Nigerian disc jockey, Syndik8 Record's official DJ and founder Obi's House. He won Best World DJ at the 2011 Nigeria Entertainment Awards. He was nominated for 2016 The Future Awards Africa Prize for Creative Professional.

== Early ==
Ajuonuma is from Ideato South, Imo State. He was born in Lagos State to Levi Chibuike Ajuonuma and Josephine Ajuonuma. He had his early education in Nigeria at Rainbow College, before moving to the US where he studied broadcasting and communication at Connecticut School of Broadcasting.

== Career ==
Ajuonuma started his career as a disc jockey while still in college studying media, broadcasting and communications at Worcester State University. He returned to Nigeria in 2012 to pursue full-time professional career as a disc jockey.

== Awards and recognition ==
Ajuonuma is an ambassador of Tag Heuer, Nike, Heineken, Jack Daniel's and Belvedere. He has performed at the MOBO Awards and MTV Africa Music Awards. He won the Best World DJ at the 2011 Nigeria Entertainment Awards and was nominated in 2016 for The Future Awards Africa Prize for Creative Professional. He has appeared on the cover page of Bold Magazine Africa 2016 Christmas Edition.
