= Naijaloaded =

Nigerian music website

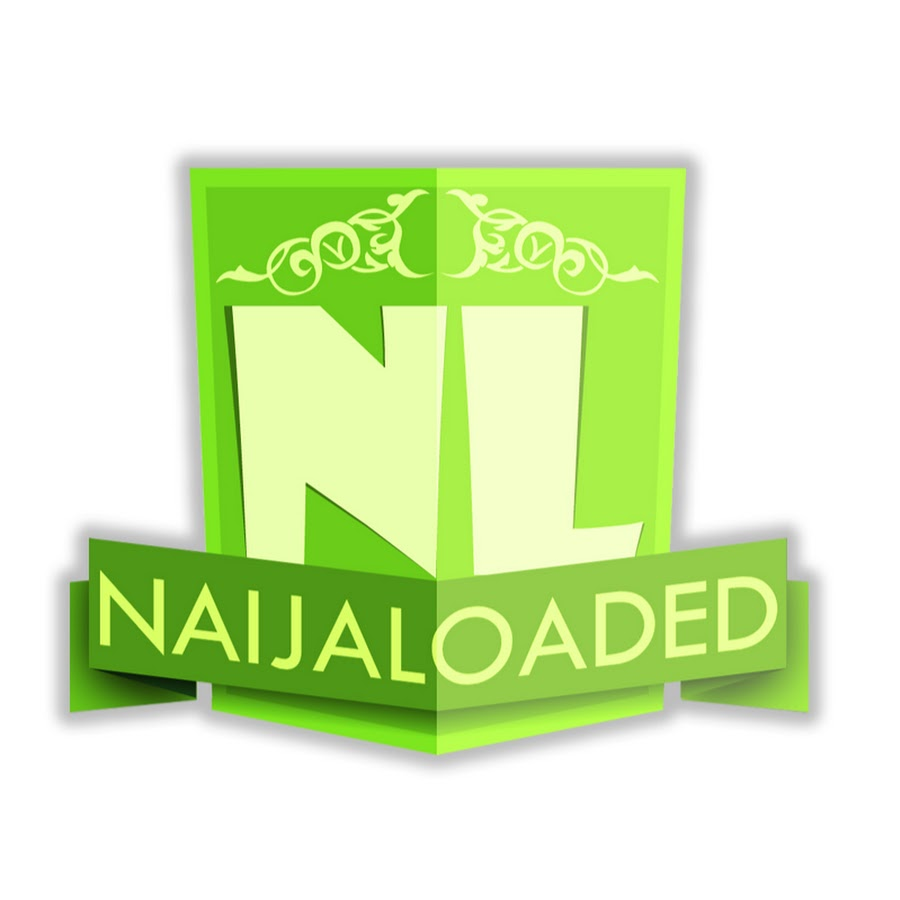
- Naijaloaded logo
- Company type: Commercial
- Website type: Music website
- Available in: English
- Headquarters: Lagos, Lagos state, {{{location_country}}}
- Area served: Worldwide
- Founder: Makinde Azeez
- Divisions: Naijaloaded TV
- Website: naijaloaded.com
- Advertising: Yes
- Commercial: Yes
- Launched: 1 October 2009; 16 years ago
- Current status: Active
- Native clients on: Android, iOS, Web
- Content license: Copyright
- Written in: CSS, HTML

Naijaloaded is a Nigerian music website founded by Makinde Azeez in 2009. It was nominated for the 2017 and 2018 City People Entertainment Awards and 2016 The Beatz Awards for "Best Music Website".
