= Do2dtun =

Nigerian on-air personality and hype-man

Oladotun Ojuolape Kayode
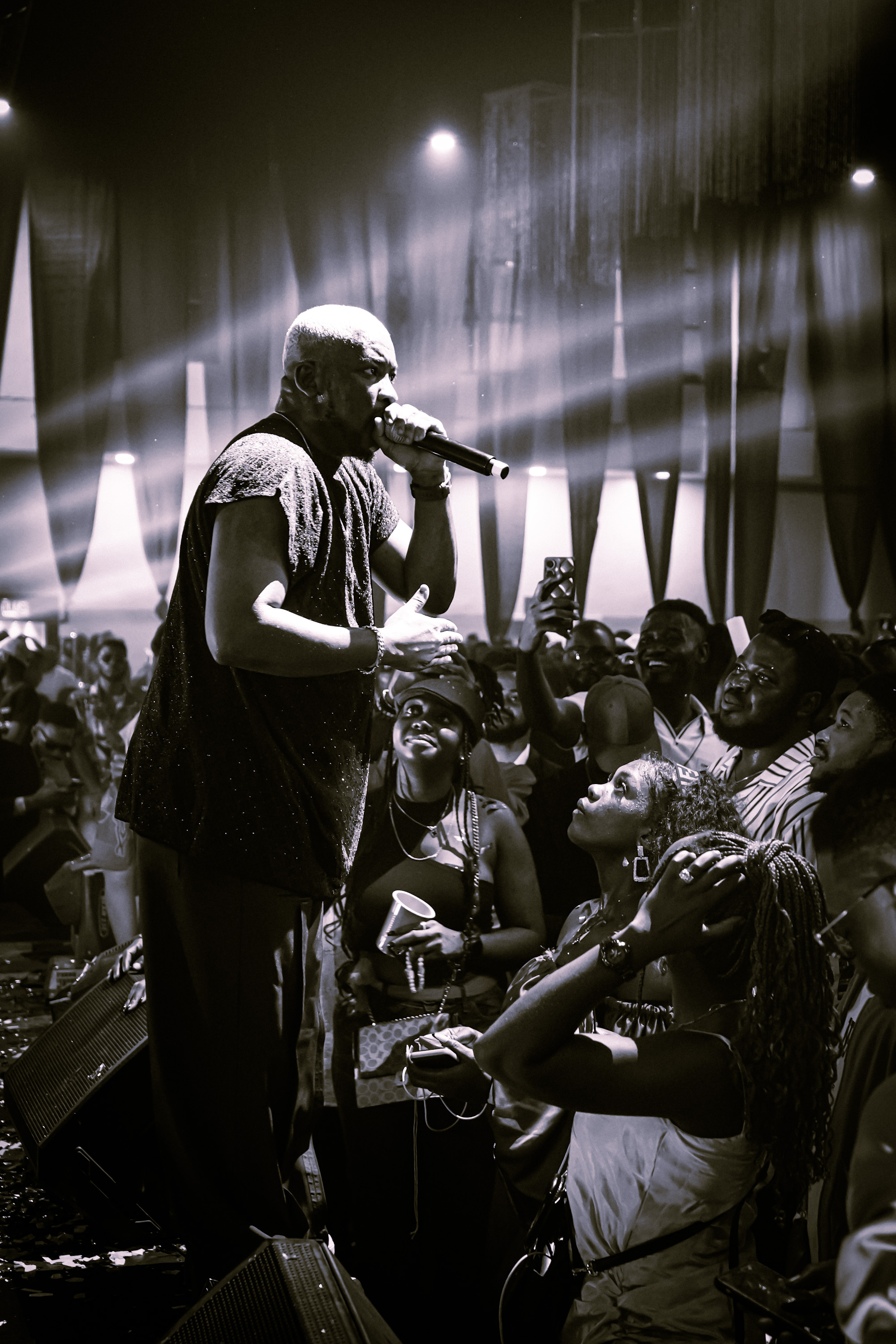
- Do2dtun performing live in 2023
- Born: 8 April 1984 (age 42)
- Other names: DO2DTUN, Host-With-The-Most, Super Hypeman, The Real Energy Gad
- Occupations: On-air personality, video jockey, hypeman, events compere, voice coach, entertainment entrepreneur
- Organization(s): Cool FM, Ecleftic Entertainment
- Television: Soundcity TV
- Awards: Dynamics All Youth Awards, The Society Awards, City People Entertainment Awards, Nigerian Broadcasters Merit Awards, Nigeria Entertainment Awards

Oladotun Ojuolape Kayode (born April 8, 1984) is a Nigerian on-air personality, video jockey, actor and media entrepreneur, popularly known as Do2dtun (Pronounced D-O-To-The-T-U-N). After pioneering a dance group called Xtreme dancers while in the university and featuring in music videos like Same Ni by Dj Zeez, Dotun came to wider prominence as a TV and radio personality, hosting shows and concerts.

== Early life ==
Oladotun Ojuolape Kayode was born in Lagos on 8 April 1984 to a building engineer father and a nurse mother. He is the first child of a nuclear family of three children. He attended Kemeesther Nursery and Primary school in Surulere, Lagos and then to the Mayflower School, Ikenne, Ogun State. He then proceeded to the Lagos State University earning a Bachelor of Arts degree in Mass Communication (with specialty in Advertising and Public Relations). He plays football on the streets of Surulere and was at one point in his life tagged "The family's black sheep". His father would always give him a transistor radio at every of his birthday anniversaries and so he listened to a lot of ace media personalities including; Steve Kadiri, Tope Brown, Olisa Aduba, Dan Forster among others.

== Career ==
=== Dancer/ Choreographer ===
Oladotun has an innate affinity for dance and while at university, he instituted a dance group he called Xtreme, they performed at different events on and off the university campus, combining the pursuit of passion and academic excellence. He became popular on campus as a result. Shortly after school, he joined (now P-Square's official choreographer), Nonso Asobe's (a.k.a. Don Flexxx) dance group Ignite and performed in many events. Then in 2006 he featured on DJ Zeez's, Same Ni video. His dancing career was steady-rising towards peak when busy radio schedules among other activities choked out the time he made out for professional dancing.

=== Broadcaster ===
Oladotun was set on his ways to continue as a professional dancer when his University lecturer Mr Nzeribe who saw his spontaneity and wittiness as a holy grail in broadcasting, and so offered him options of internship with three top radio stations at the time. Dotun choose Cool FM and hasn't looked back since. After over three years of internship, Dotun earned a chance to host a night show on radio themed "Sleep Talk", where he engaged late night radio listeners and shared with the depressed their worries. The show turned out to be his break away in the broadcasting industry. The once upon a time "studio rat" as was being mocked has ever since gone on to host quite a number of radio shows including; Chevrolet Football Fan Show, The Sunday Afternoon Show, Love Zone, Heineken's Top 20, Midday Oasis Show, Friday Nite PartyMix among others. He also hosts Soundcity TV's Greatest Countdown on Earth Radio Show.

==== Cool FM ====
Oladotun started his career in broadcasting in 2004 as an intern with Cool FM where he served for about five years before he began to host radio shows. He has since hosted numerous shows on Cool FM as well as on TV

===== 2007: Sleep Talk =====
Oladotun made his debut on Nigerian radio (Cool FM) as host of late night show called sleep talk which focuses on relationships. Sleep talk turned out to be Dotun's big break in the broadcasting industry. He hosted this show for three years.

==== 2010: The Sunday Afternoon Show ====
After leaving Sleep Talk, Dotun became host of the Sunday afternoon show which was a game show targeted at raising the ecstasy of young and happy listeners. The show had games like The Birthday Millennium Challenge among others.

==== 2011: Midday Oasis ====
Oladotun hosted the Midday Oasis on Cool FM with co-host Taymii in the afternoons. The Midday Oasis was a show on Nigerian radio intended to appeal across age groups with discussion about the entertainment industry and celebrity interviews.

==== 2016: Curious Case with Martell ====
The cognac house Martell debuted their first radio show in Nigeria and Dotun became the first host alongside two other entertainment industry stakeholders, Ayo Rotimi and chief executive officer of MyStreetz media, Sesan Adeniji. It discusses quite bluntly, issues about the entertainment industry in Nigeria with discussion being made from an insider's perspective of the industry.

==== 2017: Super Star Wednesday office Concert ====
Oladotun started hosting an office concert inside the studio of Cool FM which features top artistes performing live music for a massive digital audience during work hours. The concert has featured the best of the best musical artiste in the Nigerian music scene.

Love Zone

Oladotun was host of Love Zone at some point and the show was focused on loves and issues arising around it.

===== Friday Party Club Mix Show =====
Oladotun teamed up with one of Nigeria's top DJs to create a groovy Friday evening every week for the last couple of years, Oladotun has relied heavily on his much talked about hyping skills dishing out hypes and musical hits on radio. The show has a massive following in the country and has hosted some of the longest rap freestyles on radio with, one such occasion saw known rapper Vector come on in November, 2014 and freestyled for over an hour. The show has also featured renowned British DJ and TV host, Tim Westwood.

Chevrolet Football fan Time

American Automobile firm, Chevrolet sponsored a football show to allow football fans talk about their teams and share their emotions live on air. It was hosted by Dotun, who is a supporter of Arsenal football club.

Shape you City

Oladotun hosted this show on Cool FM and was sponsored by beer brand Heineken, it focused on fun places around the world and how they shape the individual.

Cool Best 20

In collaboration with Radio Express, DO2dTUN was host of Cool Best 20 and compiled charts for the late Tom Rounds led firm, who had the Nigeria's Rick Dee's Franchise.

==== Soundcity TV ====
2014: The Greatest Count Down on Earth Radio Show

In February 2014, Dotun became the host of Soundcity's Greatest Countdown on Earth radio show, the new magazine and chart show for videos from around the globe and has since remained in the capacity. It airs on terrestrial and cable TV and features their top 10 songs from around the world.

== Artistry ==
=== Voice-over artist ===
Oladotun has worked as a voice-over artist.

=== Influences ===
Oladotun has cited Legendary American On-Air Personality Howard Stern as one very huge influence on his broadcasting career, as well as Charlemagne Tha God and Dj Khaled.

== Concerts ==
=== 2018: Castle Lite Concert ===
Castle lite brought J.Cole to Lagos seven days after releasing his KOD album, alongside Nigerians stars like Wizkid, Davido, M.I, Ycee, Tiwa Savage and many more. Dotun was booked by planners from South Africa and hosted Castle Lite activations across the nation before the main event. He thrilled fans at Banillux event centre, Surulere, Hard Rock Café, Landmark Towers, Q4 Lounge Ikeja, Lassmal lounge in Port-Harcourt. The main event held at the 6000-capacity Eko convention centre, Victoria Island, Lagos and was filled to the brim. Dotun hosted the concert alongside Pearl Thusi of South Africa and the fans loved him all through as a lot of them said afterwards on social media.

=== 2018: Pepsi Lituation Concert ===
Oladotun hosted first of its kind event where four DJs would headline a show all by themselves in Nigeria. The show which happened in federal palace hotel featured turntable magic, special guest appearance and performances.

=== 2016: Coke Studio Season 4 Launch Party ===
Coke studio over the years has become a household name on Nigerian Television mostly for the wide range of celebrities it features across Africa and the entertainment it provides. The launch of season four in Lagos was no different with fans favorite celebrities turning up in numbers but Dotun was at the centre of it all as host with his usual non-stop dancing and the guests were no doubt entertained. The show later featured international superstar, Trey Songz

=== 2014 & 2015: Souncity Urban Blast Festival ===
Oladotun also hosted the first edition of the urban blast organized by giant music station, Soundcity.

=== 2015 Sprite Triple Slam ===
A combination of basketball games, music performance, and dance moves, the sprite triple slam takes a lot of excitement to university campuses annually. Dotun was host in 2015 touring various university campus in the country.

=== 2015 & 2016: YBNL concert ===
Oladotun took his art to London when the YBNL group of Olamide Baddo, Lil Kesh, Viktoh, Adekunle Gold visited. The 5000 capacity Hammersmith Apollo was the venue in 2016.

=== Other Concerts and Events ===
Oladotun has hosted numerous other events/concerts. He hosted the 2015 edition of Phynofest at the 12,000 capacity Ikpeazu stadium in Onitsha with lots of artiste performing. In September 2015, he hosted ace Disk Jockey, DJ Jimmy Jatt's concert, The Festival. April, 2015, he performed at a live Easter concert in Maryland, USA; where he performed alongside Olamide.

Oladotun hosts corporate events, end of year parties and wedding receptions as well.

== Endorsements, Business Ventures ==
DO2TUN is the chief executive officer of record label, Ecleftic Entertainment, which has on its books, Nigerian music star, Pepenazi. He is a social influencer who handles social media and creates content for Bank of Industry. He is also creative director for Ile Ila and Angeli Stores. Oladotun has done social media activations for various brands such as Guinness, Coca-Cola, Martell, Castle Lite and a lot more.

== Personal life ==
Family

Dotun hails from Odigbo in Ondo State. He is the first born and has two siblings, one of whom is a Nigerian Musical act, Pepenazi. Dotun has two daughters.

== Filmography ==
Television

Industreet (2017)

== Awards ==
Dotun has won quite a number of awards and recognition. He was in July 2016 enlisted among net.ng's most influential OAPs. He was awarded

Year	Event	Prize	Result	Ref
2011	The Society Awards	Radio Personality of the Year	Won	
2011	The Future Awards	Broadcaster of the year	Nominated	
2011	Dynamix All Youth Awards	OAP of the Year	Won	
2012	Nigeria Broadcasters Merit Award	Young Radio Presenter of the Year	Won	
2012	The Future Awards	Broadcaster of the year	Nominated	
2015	Nigerian Entertainment Awards	On Air Personality of the Year	Won	
2015	City People Awards	On Air Personality of the Year	Won	
2021	Net Honours	On Air Personality of the Year	Won	
