= Galaxy Television (Nigeria) =

First private TV channel in Nigeria

Galaxy TV
- Type: Multimedia channels
- Country: Nigeria

Programming
- Languages: English, Nigerian Pidgin

History
- Launched: May 1994

Links
- Website: www.galaxytvonline.com

Galaxy Television's re-branded logo

Galaxy Television is the first privately registered television station in Nigeria.

Galaxy started full broadcasting in May 1994 from the hills of Oke-Are, Ibadan with 10 kilowatts Aerodyne transmitter.

In January 2002, the station established a second Galaxy Television Station (Channel 27) in Lagos to ensure full coverage of the Western States.

Galaxy Television was founded by Steve Ojo(CEO).

== See also ==
- List of television stations in Nigeria
- Kolawole Olawuyi
