= Naeto C =

Nigerian rapper

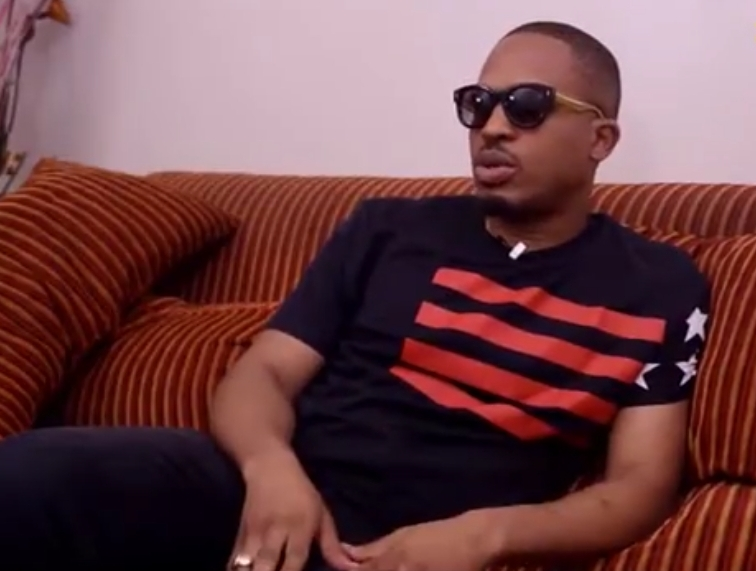

Background information
- Also known as: The 'P', Super C
- Born: Naetochukwu Chikwe
- Origin: Imo State, Nigeria
- Genres: Rap, African hip hop
- Occupations: Singer-songwriter, rapper
- Years active: 2006–present
- Label: Storm 360, Cerious Music

Naetochukwu Chikwe, stage name Naeto C, is a Nigerian rapper, Afrobeat artist and record producer. He rose to prominence with the track 'Kini Big Deal' which is credited for changing the Nigerian hip hop sound. Known for his catchy hooks and smooth flow, he is regarded as one of the most influential Nigerian rappers.

He has won several awards some of which are the HHWA best hip hop single 2009, Soundcity best male video 2009, Best new act at the MTV MAMA’s award 2008. He also won 3 Channel O Awards, The Headies and many others.

== Early life and education ==
He was born in Houston, Texas and is of Nigerian origin. The Governor of Imo State, Emeka Ihedioha appointed Naeto C, as his Special Assistant on Lagos Liaison.

After finishing his secondary education in Lagos, he moved to the United States for higher education both in SUNY Old Westbury and a year later, George Washington University. At this time, he met Uzikwendu and Ikechukwu, who was then an aspiring hip-hop artist out of Washington Heights, New York. The trio went on to form the World Famous Academy, a brotherhood of musicians. They planned to grow into an independent record label but could not get their hands on the proper funds. Naeto C graduated in 2004 from the George Washington University with a BSc. in Biology, intending to go study further and become a medical doctor. After some deep self-searching he changed his mind and decided to pursue his dream and develop his talent as a musician.

In 2010 Naeto pursued an MSc in Energy Studies at the University of Dundee in Scotland. It was reported in the Summer of 2013 by his mother that he was attending the University of Oxford in England studying "a course in Energy Economics" however there was no further elaboration on this course. On November 17, 2020, Naeto C graduated with a Master's of Science in Energy Economics from the University Of Dundee, Scotland.

== Career ==
Storm Records (a record company based in Lagos, Nigeria) had been trying to sign the World Famous Akademy for some time, and since Naeto had decided to pursue his career as a musician, he agreed along with the rest of the WFA. But they did not return to Nigeria until early 2006, when Ikechukwu released his debut album, Son Of the Soil. That album laid the grounds for Naeto C and the WFA. Working as an in-house producer with his newly discovered production team "ET-Quake" (consisting of TY Mix and VC Perez), Naeto was able to display his production skills working with Storm artists like Sasha, Dare Art-Alade, GT the Guitarman, Disconnect, Saro-Wiwa and Nkiru. Within a year of working with the aforementioned artists, Naeto had successfully recorded over 60 songs, including his sophomore album material (the bulk of which he co-produced with ET-Quake).

A notable production achievement is the "I Believe" song Naeto wrote and co-produced with VC Perez (member of ET-Quake), which features himself, an up-and-coming R&B/Gospel artist, Sheun and Hugh Masekela from South Africa. Within the same year Naeto garnered a lot of experience performing, from Ikechukwu's album launch to Channel O awards to the I Believe Tour to Always promo tour with Sasha and many more gigs, in preparation for the phenomenal MTN Homecoming Concert, headlined by a favoured friend, Nigerian pop sensation, D’banj. "Naeto C" recorded over 50 songs for his debut with production that transcended the hip hop sound of that time. From the Fela inspired "Lagos City Hustla" the most articulate reflection of Hip-Hop/Afro-beat till date to the down-south-melody-stricken first single "Sitting on Top", Naeto C has broken all boundaries and surpassed more limits than any up and coming artist, lyrically and production wise according to MO HIT RECORD. His debut album You Know My "P" was released in May 2008 through Storm Records, and his second studio album Super C Season was released on 7 February 2011 through Storm Records and Cerious Music. On 14 August 2015, Naeto C released his third studio album Day 1 through Cerious Music and White Kaftan Gang. The album featured guest appearances from Maka Maka and Wizkid; production was handled by Sossick, Teckzilla, and Masterkraft. Released as a surprise album, Day 1 was recorded in just seven days, with Naeto C working closely with Nigerian producer Sossick. The album was designed to be heavily hip-hop-oriented, contrasting with Festival, his other 2015 release, which leaned more towards mainstream pop sounds. Initially, Naeto C intended to release Day 1 for free but later opted to distribute it on paid platforms like iTunes upon the advice of his team. The release of Day 1 was part of Naeto C’s strategy to build his catalog in 2015, a year in which he aimed to put out as much music as possible. Joey Akan of Pulse Nigeria praised Day 1 as a strong return to Naeto C's roots, describing it as "a Rapcore album, with impressive nods to R&B," and noting the absence of Afrobeats in favor of focused lyricism and diverse production. The album, which features trap beats, introspection, and standout collaborations, was rated 3.5 out of 5, signaling that "Naeto is back." As of 2018, Naeto C's net worth was estimated to be $7.5 million and he was ranked among the wealthiest and most influential artists in Nigeria.

== Personal life ==
Naeto C is married to Nicole Chikwe and they have three children. His wife described him as a 'perfect husband' despite his celebrity lifestyle, which has sustained the family and marriage. She said this in an interview with the News Agency of Nigeria (NAN) in 2019.

== Discography ==
- 2009: U Know My "P"
- 2011: Super C Season
- 2015: Day 1
- 2015: Festival

== Awards and nominations ==
Award	Year	Category	Result
MTV Africa Music Awards	2008	Best New Musician	Won
Channel O Music Video Awards	2009	Video of the Year	Won
MTV Africa Music Awards	2009	Best New Artist	Won
The Headies	2012	Artiste of the Year	Nominated
The Headies	2012	Album of the Year (Super C Season)	Nominated
