= Obi Asika =

Director-General National Council for Arts and Culture NCAC

- Born: 3 October 1968 (age 58); Onitsha, Anambra State, Nigeria
- Occupations: Director-General, National Council for Arts and Culture NCAC. Nigerian creative industry expert, record label executive, television & live event executive producer
- Spouse: Yetunde Asika
- Website: www.obiasika.com.ng

Obi Asika (born 3 October 1968) is the Director-General, National Council for Arts and Culture, NCAC. He was appointed on 12 January 2024 by President Bola Ahmed Tinubu. Before his appointment, he is known for his involvement in the growth of Nigeria's music industry, as the founder and CEO of Storm 360, an indigenous music label. Storm 360 has spawned a lot of Nigerian entertainers including Jazzman Olofin, Darey Art-Alade, Naeto C, Ikechukwu, Sasha P, General Pype, L.O.S., Ms Jaie, Tosin Martins, GT Da Guitarman, and Yung 6ix.

He is a founding partner of Dragon Africa, a strategic communications firm based in London, Lagos and Accra; and the chairman of OutSource Media, a leading communications and content production company. Asika is a prominent figure in laying the infrastructure for the growth and development of the media and entertainment industry.

== Background and education ==
Asika, born in Lagos, comes from the town of Onitsha in Anambra State, Nigeria. He was born at the peak of the Nigerian Civil War. His father, Anthony Ukpabi Asika, was the administrator of East Central State, Nigeria during the military regime of General Yakubu Gowon. Asika attended Ekulu Primary School, Enugu from 1974 to 1977, and then proceeded to the United Kingdom where he attended Ashdown House, East Sussex between 1977 and 1982. From Ashdown House, he gained a direct entry into Eton College, having obtained a Distinction in the National Common Entrance Exams in the UK. At Eton College, Asika held several positions, including school prefect, secretary of the Political Society and secretary of the Film Society.

Asika was a research assistant at the World Trade Centre of Nigeria between 1986 and 1987. In 1987, he enrolled at the University of Warwick, from which he received an LLB Hons in 1990. At the University of Warwick, he was secretary of the Nigerian Society, member of the Political Society and Afro-Caribbean Society, radio host and DJ, and events promoter.

== Career ==
Asika has wide transnational business interests in areas including oil and gas, real property, information technology, agriculture, sports, media & entertainment. Between 1987 and 1990, he organized successful concerts, charity and entertainment events at university campuses around the UK. He hosted a weekly radio show at the University of Warwick. He was equally DJ and promoter of over 200 events at universities and clubs in London, using venues such as Legends, Dingwalls, Camden Palace, Brighton Hippodrome, Wall Street, Shaftesbury's, Crazy Larry's, Roxanne's, and L’Equipe Anglaise.

In 1991, Asika founded Storm Productions, a Nigerian entertainment company whose record label arm is notable for ushering in a new generation of Nigerian musical talent, including Naeto C, Ikechukwu, Sasha P, Tosin Martins, Banky W, who changed and developed the Nigerian music landscape.

Asika is the chairman of OutSource Media, a leading communications and content company that has been involved in the production of Nigerian reality television programming such as Big Brother Nigeria, The Apprentice Africa, Dragons' Den, Glo Naija Sings, Vodafone Icons Ghana, Calabar Rocks, Amstel Malta Box Office, 100% Naija, And the Winner Is..., Football Legends, The Voice, and Ignite Africa.

Asika is the founder of Dragon Africa, a strategic advisory firm which holds the rights to, and produces, Social Media Week Lagos, a conference on new media, technology and business. Asika is chairman of the advisory board and the executive producer of the conference.

Asika served as the West Africa partner and co-founder of AMPN West Africa, a production company network which works across Lagos, Nairobi and South Africa with TV formats including The Voice, And The Winner Is..., and I Love My Country, with offices in Amsterdam, Lagos and Johannesburg.

Asika continues to work with the World Bank, international companies, and government at state and federal levels to shape public policy and create an enabling environment for the creative industries in particular and commerce in general. He has been involved in developing and nurturing entrepreneurship, sports, creativity, and youth by contributing to various government and policy shaping initiatives including being a Governing Council member, Nigeria, Africa 2.0, and Senior Special Assistant to the President of the Federal Republic of Nigeria, President Goodluck Jonathan (2015).

In terms of sports development, Asika has served on numerous bodies as well as driving sporting activities around the African continent including: Eko Football (Lagos Football Association) and Soccerex West Africa.

In 2014, Asika was appointed to the African Advisory Committee of the Smithsonian’s National Museum of African Art in Washington, DC. He is the first overseas individual invited to join the committee. On 16 December 2017, at the 3rd edition of The Beatz Awards, Asika was honored with the Industry Professional of the Year Award, by the organizers.

Asika’s latest project is a 10-part documentary called Journey of the Beats which, according to Punch newspaper, aims to tell how the "...present generation of Nigerian artists found their confidence and identity through music and how it enabled the enormous growth of youth culture in Nigeria and on the African continent. It tells a story of a genre of music that has unlocked a global movement from small independent labels and promoters in Lagos to spread globally and produce billions of streams, hits, and fans." The show premiered on 23 June 2022 on Show max.

In a Native magazine profile of Asika by Emmanuel Esomnofu, it was hinted that the project was born from Asika's many years of attentiveness to Afrobeats sound led by the historian Ed Keazor and veteran music journalist Sunday Adebiyi. Esomnofu writes, "That quest took them to the sonic exchange that began when Africans were taken across the Atlantic as slaves, to the music of rebellion they created wherever they found themselves. In Africa, genres were still being moulded and parsed through our unique experiences."
