= BEN Television =

Bright Entertainment Network

Programming
- Picture format: 576i (16:9 SDTV)

History
- Launched: 2003

Links
- Website: bentelevision.com

BEN Television (Bright Entertainment Network) is a British television channel launched in 2003, aimed mainly at expatriate Africans living in Europe. According to its official website "The BEN ethos is, 'safe family viewing and empowering communities'." The channel is free to air on Sky.

As well as home-grown programming and Nollywood films the channel also carries several hours of programming every day from NTA and KAFTAN TV.

On 3 September 2007, channel 146 on the EPG was taken over by Zone Media (now AMC Networks International UK) with the channel Zone Romantica being launched. This meant that BEN TV is no longer broadcast on that channel number and has therefore been moved to its BEN TV 2 slot of channel 194.

Alistair Soyode is the founder and chairman of BEN Television.

As part of BEN TV's corporate social responsibility, the social enterprise Bright Entertainment Network Community Enterprise (BENCE) was created. BENCE works to support local communities and societies in engaging with the industry through various initiatives.

On 28 January 2021 KAFTAN TV launched in the UK, on BEN TV.

On 6 May 2021, BEN in collaboration with other channels came together to form a bigger Black led ethnic media platform on the Astra 2G and is broadcasting with the new channels reaching wider black and ethnic viewers in Europe.
