= Muson Centre =

Performance hall

Background
- Location: Onikan, Lagos Island, Lagos, Lagos State, Nigeria
- Type: Performing-arts centre
- Established: 1983
- Divisions: Muson Choir; Muson School of Music; Muson Symphony Orchestra; Muson Festival
- Performances: orchestra; opera; drama; musical; chorale; lecture; concerts; events; participatory
- Also Called: Musical Society of Nigeria

Information
- Website: www.muson.org
- coordinates: 6.4548791°N 3.4245984°E

The MUSON Centre (Musical Society of Nigeria) is a performance hall in Lagos. The multipurpose civic auditorium is located in the centre of Lagos Island, situated between the National Museum, the City Mall, the Onikan Stadium and the former official residence of Nigeria's Governors-General, and adjacent to Tafawa Balewa Square.

== History ==
The Musical Society of Nigeria (MUSON) was established in 1983 on the site of the former "Love Garden" (prior to the unveiling of the center's facilities by Prince Charles in 1995). MUSON was founded to provide facilities for classical music performances in Nigeria, especially in Lagos.

The need for musical training and instruction spurred the establishment of the Muson School of Music in 1989. MUSON represents the Associated Board of the Royal Schools of Music (ABRSM) in Nigeria and offers ABRSM theory and practical examinations. MUSON regularly organizes concerts of both Nigerian and Western genres. The MUSON choir commenced performances in 1995, while the MUSON Symphony Orchestra (Nigeria’s only professional symphony orchestra at the time) commenced performances in 2005. They perform regularly at the annual MUSON Festival and during the society’s concert season. The MUSON Choir and the MUSON Symphony Orchestra are also invited to perform outside MUSON.

== Divisions ==
=== The MUSON School of Music ===
The MUSON School of Music, founded in 1989 by the Musical Society of Nigeria and accredited by the Federal Government of Nigeria, is a comprehensive institution of music. It is Nigeria’s premier classical music conservatoire for all age groups. The school of music encompasses a basic school of music and the diploma school.
