= Falz discography =

Artist discography

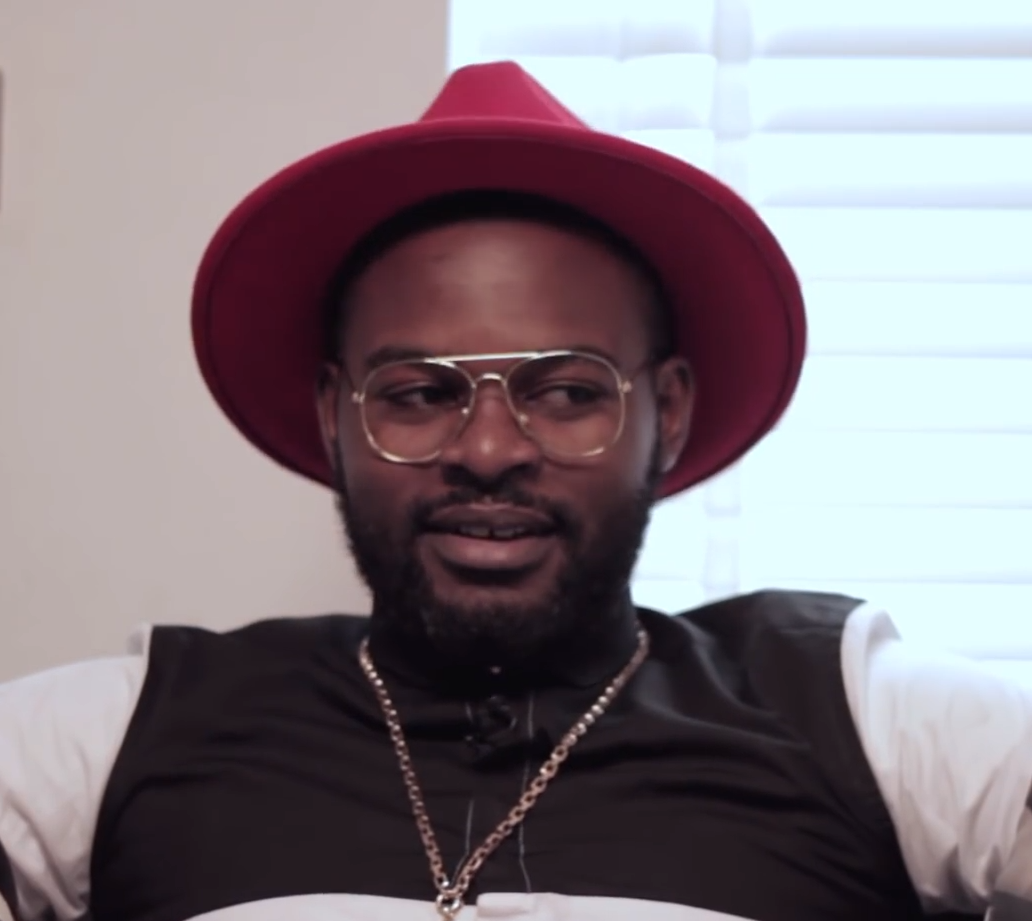
- Falz during an interview in May 2016
- Studio albums: 4
- EPs: 1
- Mixtapes: 1

The discography of Nigerian rapper Falz includes four studio albums, one mixtape, one EP and numerous singles.

Falz began his career with the release of Shakara: The Mixtape in 2009. He released his debut album Wazup Guy in 2014, to critical acclaim. His second album Stories That Touch was released in 2015, to further acclaim.

He released his debut collaborative extended play Chemistry with singer Simi. In 2017 on his 27th birthday, he released his third studio album 27 as a surprise album.

On January 15, 2019, he released his fourth studio album and his most commercially successful yet Moral Instruction.

== Albums ==
=== Studio albums ===
Title	Album details
Wazup Guy	Released: May 30, 2014; Label: Bahd Guys Entertainment; Formats: CD, digital download
Stories That Touch	Released: November 17, 2015; Label: Bahd Guys Entertainment; Formats: CD, digital download
27	Released: October 27, 2017; Label: Bahd Guys Entertainment; Formats: CD, digital download
Moral Instruction	Released: January 15, 2019; Label: Bahd Guys Entertainment; Formats: CD, digital download

=== Mixtapes ===
- Shakara: The Mixtape (2009)

== EPs ==
Title	Album details
Chemistry (with Simi)	Released: October 27, 2016; Labels: Bahd Guys Records, X3M Music; Formats: Digital download

== Selected singles ==
Year	Title	Album
2011	"Waz Up Guy"	Wazup Guy
2012	"Cool Parry"	Wazup Guy
2012	"123" (featuring Oyinkansola)	Wazup Guy
2012	"Welcome To The Jungle"	Non-album single
2013	"High Class"	Wazup Guy
2013	"Currency"	Wazup Guy
2014	"Jessica"	Wazup Guy
2014	"Toyin Tomato"	Wazup Guy
2014	"Marry Me" (featuring Poe & Yemi Alade)	Wazup Guy
2014	"Pound Cake (Freestyle)" (featuring Chyn)	Non-album single
2015	"Ello Bae"	Stories That Touch
2015	"Karishika" (featuring Phyno & Chigurl)	Stories That Touch
2015	"Karishika (Part II)" (featuring M.I & ShowDemKamp)	Stories That Touch
2015	"Celebrity Girlfriend" (featuring Reekado Banks)	Stories That Touch
2015	"Soldier" (featuring Simi)	Stories That Touch
2015	"Clap" (featuring Reminisce)	Stories That Touch
2016	"Bahd Baddo Baddest" (featuring Olamide & Davido)	27
2017	"Wehdonsir"	27
2017	"Baby Boy"	27
2017	"Jeje"	27
2017	"Something Light" (featuring Ycee)	27
2017	"La Fete"	27
2018	"Next" (featuring Medikal & Maleek Berry)	27
2018	"Boogie" (featuring Sir Dauda)	27
2018	"Le vrai badt guy"	27
2018	"This is Nigeria"	Non-album single
2018	"Sweet Boy"	Non-album single
2018	"Child of the World"	27
2019	"Talk"	Moral Instruction
2019	"Hypocrite"	Moral Instruction
2019	"Alakori" (featuring Dice Ailes)	Non-album single
2019	"Girls" (featuring Patoranking)	Non-album single
2020	"Bop Daddy" (featuring Ms. Banks)	Non-album single
2021	"Mercy"	
2023	"O Wa" (featuring Tekno)	
