= 2017 in African music =

== Events ==
- January 2 - The annual Kaapse Klopse minstrel festival takes place in Cape Town.
- February 24-25 - "Ultra South Africa" festival is held in Cape Town and Johannesburg, headlined by Dash Berlin, David Guetta and KSHMR.
- March 13 - The 30th anniversary of the death of Nigerian organist and composer Fela Sowande is marked by an article by Godwin Sadoh.
- July 5 - The grave of George Wilberforce Kakoma, composer of the Ugandan National anthem, is reported to have been vandalised and the composer's body stolen.
- September 5 - Mauritanian singer and politician Malouma Mint El Meidah is placed under house arrest by the government, following an investigation into "economic crimes".

== Albums ==
- March 11 - Korede Bello - Belloved
- March 30 - Iyanya - Signature (EP)
- March 31 - Orchestra Baobab - Tribute to Ndiouga Dieng
- April 14 - Spoek Mathambo - Mzansi Beat Code
- May 14 - Ike Moriz - Gold Rush
- May 29 - Skales - The Never Say Never Guy
- June 1 - Banky W. - Songs About U
- June 9 - Bemyoda - Stark
- June 27 - Flavour - Ijele the Traveler
- June 30 - Omawumi - Timeless
- July 7 - Fally Ipupa - Tokooos
- July 14 - TUKS Camerata - Indodana
- July 14 - Wizkid - Sounds from the Other Side
- August 1 - Youssou N'Dour - Seeni Valeurs
- August 25 - D'banj - King Don Come
- August 31 - Ric Hassani - The African Gentleman
- September 1 - A-Q - Blessed Forever
- September 8 - Simi - Simisola
- September 22 - Maurice Louca, Maryam Saleh & Tamer Abu Ghazaleh - Lekhfa
- September 22 - Tiwa Savage - Sugarcane (EP)
- October 8 - DJ Spinall - Dreams
- October 27 - Johnny Clegg - King of Time
- October 27 - Falz - 27
- November 17 - Olamide - Lagos Nawa
- November 24 - Yung6ix - High Star
- November 24 - Ajebutter22 – What Happens In Lagos

== Classical ==
- Amr Okba - "Lonely, I Am Lonely"

== Musical films ==
- Lotanna, starring Liz Benson and Jide Kosoko

== Deaths ==
- January 16 - William Onyeabor, 70, Nigerian musician and businessman
- August 11 - Segun Bucknor, 71, Nigerian musician (complications from multiple strokes)
- September 2 - Halim El-Dabh, 96, Egyptian composer and ethnomusicologist
- December 1 - Maelé, 59, Equatorial Guinean singer

== See also ==
- 2017 in music
