= What Happens in Lagos =

Studio album by Ajebutter22
- Released: 24 November 2017
- Recorded: 2016–2017
- Genres: Alternative hip-hop; Afro-pop; Afrobeats
- Length: 55:04
- Languages: English; Yoruba; Nigerian Pidgin
- Label: Jungle Entertainment Ventures
- Producers: Studio Magic; Maleek Berry; P2J; Spax; TMT; DJ Java

Ajebutter22 chronology
Anytime Soon (2014)	What Happens in Lagos (2017)	Make E No Cause Fight (with BOJ) (2018)

Singles from What Happens in Lagos
- 1. "Bad Gang" Released: April 15, 2016

What Happens in Lagos is the second studio album by Nigerian rapper and singer Ajebutter22. It was released on 24 November 2017 through Jungle Entertainment Ventures. The album features guest appearances from BOJ, Falz, Odunsi (The Engine), and G-Young, as well as contributions from the DRB LasGidi collective. Production was handled by Studio Magic, Maleek Berry, P2J, Spax, TMT, and DJ Java, among others. "Bad Gang", a collaboration with Falz, was released as the album's lead single and was nominated for Best Street Hop Artiste of the Year at The 2016 Headies, as well as Best Afro Hip-Hop Video at the Nigeria Music Video Awards.

The album combines elements of Afrobeats, Afro-pop, and alternative hip-hop, and incorporates lyrics delivered in English, Yoruba, and Nigerian Pidgin. What Happens in Lagos follows Ajebutter22's earlier project Anytime Soon (2014).

== Background ==
After the release of his debut album, Anytime Soon in 2014, Ajebutter22 released two promotional singles, "Bad Gang" and "Abroad" on April 15, 2016, both featuring rapper Falz. At a live performance at Jameson Connects Nigeria on November 10, 2017, he announced the album's title and revealed its release date.

The album uses Lagos as its setting as well as its theme. It talks about issues such as employment, money, relationships, pressures, nightlife, ambition, and how hard it is to make a living in Lagos. And had collaborations with other Nigerian musicians like M.I., Falz, Maleek Berry, and Odunsi.

=== Title and artwork ===
Ajebutter22, on his interpretation of the album artwork

I wanted to document the different phases on the path to the “Lagos Big Boy” status that seems to be the Lagos Dream, the album goes from a hopeful student to a struggling working class man and finally the big boy with a questionable past.

The album title is derived from the slogan "What happens in Vegas stays in Vegas" but is modified to suit the theme of the album which is Lagos. The album art represents a journey through life as a student, employment and finally the wealthier life connected with being a "Lagos Big Boy". He explained that it was supposed to be a representation of various stages in the process and its expectations. The cover was a part of the satirical perspective on life in Lagos presented in the album. As opposed to the linear story, it was said to feature various aspects of work, social life, and success in the city.

What Happens in Lagos was released on 24 November 2017 by Jungle Entertainment Ventures.

== Composition ==
=== Songs ===
The album starts with "Good Place to Start," through which it brings its Lagos-centered outlook to life. This track starts with a spoken-word intro by Koromone Koye, followed by an act from Mystro. The themes of money and city life were used in "4AM" and "Dollar Ti Won". "4AM" focused mainly on money and financial matters. From here, the album then moved into the themes of social relationships and social standing in tracks like "Rich Friends". "Bad Gang" with Falz features the theme of social relationships and behavior. "We Are Bad Boys" with M.I Abaga continues the theme of masculinity in the album.

"Wayward" was released prior to the release of the album and one of the singles from it. The song is an Afrobeat song about sexual and romantic interests, It talks about complex relationship and tells the story from the point of view of a man whose actions have contributed to the complexity of the relationship. "Yoruba Boys Trilogy" featuring Odunsi the Engine and "Anything for the Boys" are songs about the social lives of men and their relationships. In the song titled "Good Place to Start", the theme of the album is established when the city is viewed both as an environment where people have opportunities and face challenges. In the song "4 AM", the artist focuses on the aspect of getting up very early in order to go to work, whereas "Dollar Ti Won" explores the aspect of economics and the value of the naira.

"Lifestyle", featuring Maleek Berry focuses on relationships, money and the lifestyle associated with Lagos social circles. It was accompanied by a music video.

== Reception ==
Writing for Netng, Victor Okpala described What Happens in Lagos as a reflection of contemporary life and urban culture in Lagos. He noted the album's treatment of social class, relationships, employment and money, and highlighted songs such as "4AM", "Bad Gang" and "Rich Friends" for addressing traffic, political and social issues, and the pressures associated with wealth and status. Okpala praised Ajebutter22's storytelling, concluding that the album presented a recognisable picture of life in modern Lagos rather than placing commercial appeal above its central themes. In its review of "Rich Friends", YNaija highlighted Ajebutter22's humorous approach to social commentary and his observations on wealth and class. The publication noted the song's sparse, bass-heavy production and interpreted its lyrics as a reflection on the anxieties and insecurities that can arise from comparing oneself with people from wealthy backgrounds. The Native praised the album's storytelling particularly its depiction of poverty and everyday life in Lagos. The publication singled out "Rich Friends" as the album's strongest track and noted the record's use of spoken-word passages to connect its stories. It concluded that the album offered an honest portrait of millennial life in Lagos.

The Guardian compared the album with Olamide's Lagos Nawa, noting that both albums used Lagos as a central theme while approaching the city from different social perspectives.

== Track listing ==
What Happens In Lagos track listing
No.	Title	Writer(s)	Producer(s)	Length
1.	"Good Place to Start" (featuring Mystro)	Akitoye Balogun; Segun Micheal Ajayi	Mystro; Studio Magic; TMT	04:28
2.	"4AM" (featuring Dremo)	A. Balogun; Dremo	Studio Magic; DJ Java	3:53
3.	"Dollar Ti Won"	A. Balogun; Oloruntosin Babalola	Studio Magic	4:18
4.	"Rich Friends" (featuring M.I Abaga)	Jude Lemfani Abaga; A. Balogun	Remy Baggins	3:30
5.	"Bad Gang" (featuring Falz)	Folarin Falana; A. Balogun	Platinum Toxx (Oloruntosin Babalola)	3:24
6.	"We Are Bad Boys" (featuring M.I Abaga)	A. Balogun; Oloruntosin Babalola (Platinum Toxx); Jude Abaga	Studio Magic	3:20
7.	"Wayward"	A. Balogun; Oloruntosin Babalola (Platinum Toxx)	Makblaze	3:46
8.	"Yoruba Boys Trilogy" (featuring Odunsi the Engine)	A. Balogun; Oloruntosin Babalola (Platinum Toxx); Odunsi	Studio Magic; Odunsi the Engine; Da-P	6:30
9.	"Anything For The Boys" (featuring Odunsi the Engine)	A. Balogun; Oloruntosin Babalola	Studio Magic; Sammy Juice	3:57
10.	"Lifestyle" (featuring Maleek Berry)	A. Balogun; Platinum Toxx	Studio Magic; Da-P	4:07
11.	"Happy Ending"	Akitoye Balogun; Oloruntosin Babalola	Platinum Toxx	3:22
12.	"Lagos Big Boy"	Akitoye Balogun; Tosin Babalola	Studio Magic	3:42
13.	"Biggie Man"	A. Balogun; Oloruntosin Babalola	Studio Magic	3:41
14.	"Ghana Bounce"			3:45
Total length:				55:23

== Personnel ==
Musicians

- Ajebutter22 – vocals
- Mystro – vocals
- Dremo – vocals
- Falz – vocals
- M.I – vocals
- Odunsi the Engine – vocals
- Maleek Berry – vocals

Technical

- Studio Magic – production, mixing
- TMT – production
- DJ Java – production
- Yele Bademosi – production
- Remy Baggins – production
- Da-P – production
- Sammy Juice – production
- Odunsi – production
