= Falana (surname) =

Falana is a surname. Notable people with the surname include:

- Femi Falana (born 1958), Nigerian lawyer and human rights activist
- Funmi Falana, Nigerian legal practitioner and women's rights activist
- Lola Falana (born 1942), American singer, dancer, model, and actress
