= Prodigeezy =

Nigerian director and cinematographer

- Born: Iyobosa Rehoboth; 7 November 1994 (age 31); Edo State, Nigeria
- Occupations: Filmmaker, Entrepreneur
- Years active: 2010 - Present

Iyobosa Rehoboth, also known as Prodigeezy, is a Nigerian music video director and cinematographer.

== Early life ==
Rehoboth hails from Edo State in Nigeria. He grew up in Port Harcourt, Nigeria.

== Career ==
Prodigeezy has directed numerous music videos for recording artists across various genres, including controversial song by Falz "This Is Nigeria", Killin’ Dem by Burna Boy, Don't Call me back by Joeboy, Joey B, Falz, Ric Hassani, among others.

== Selected videography ==
- Burna Boy ft Zlatan - Killin Dem
- Burna Boy - Boshe Nlo
- Falz-This Is Nigeria
- Falz-Talk
- Falz-Hypocrite
- Falz-Moral instruction
- Falz-Sweet Boy
- GuiltyBeatz ft Joey B, Falz - Iyabo
- Joeboy- Don't Call me back
- Ric Hassani- Number one
- Chef 187 ft Mr. P – One more time

== Awards and nominations ==
In 2018 he won Best Music Video of the Year (Director) by Nigeria Entertainment Awards for his project This Is Nigeria.

In 2019 he was nominated for Best Music Video of the Year (Director) by The Headies for his project "Talk".

== See also ==
- List of Nigerian cinematographers
