= Bad Gang =

2016 single by Ajebutter featuring Falz

Single by Ajebutter22 featuring Falz

from the album What Happens in Lagos
- Released: April 15, 2016
- Recorded: 2016
- Genre: Afrobeats; Industrial hip-hop
- Length: 3:44
- Label: Jungle Entertainment Ventures
- Songwriters: Akitoye Balogun; Folarin Falana
- Producer: Studio Magic

Ajebutter22 singles chronology
"Ghana Bounce" (2016)	"Bad Gang" (2016)	"Lagos Big Boy" (2016)

Falz singles chronology
"Bahd Baddo Baddest (featuring Olamide & Davido)" (2016)

Music video
- "Bad Gang" on YouTube

"Bad Gang" is a song by Nigerian rapper and singer Ajebutter22 featuring Falz. It was released on 15 April, 2016 as the lead single from Ajebutter22's second studio album What Happens in Lagos. The track was produced by Studio Magic. The song was nominated for Best Street Hop Artiste of the Year at The Headies, as well as Best Afro Hip-Hop Video at the Nigeria Music Video Awards.

== Composition and release ==
"Bad Gang" featuring Falz, was released on 15 April 2016. The track continues Ajebutter22's conversational style, combined with Falz's satirical delivery. It is built on a mid-tempo Afrobeats production with minimal instrumentation and a mix of English, Nigerian Pidgin, and Yoruba.

== Music video ==
On July 6, 2016, the music video for "Bad Gang" was released on YouTube, which was directed by King Davies. The video opens with a skit from comedian IamKanmi who says, "Daughter, daughter… what is all this I’m hearing? I hear that you're now a ring leader—engineer carry over? Wait, wait… no wonder you used to say, 'Daddy, my favourite refreshment is palm wine and shawarma'". The video also features cameo appearances from BOJ and his sister, Taymi B.

The music video takes a narrative and humorous approach, where both Ajebutter22 and Falz appear as professors of a university. In this case, their interactions with students who exhibit behaviors that reflect the song's theme of peer pressure and alternative living are captured.

When the music video was uploaded on YouTube and other digital platforms, it helped to popularize the song. It is noteworthy that the music video closely matches the tone of the song, especially through its humorous undertones.

== Accolades ==
Year	Awards ceremony	Award description(s)	Results
2016	The Headies	Best Street Hop Artiste of the Year	Nominated
2016	Nigeria Music Video Awards	Best Afro Hip-Hop Video	Nominated
