= Sess the Prblm Kid =

Nigerian record producer and musician

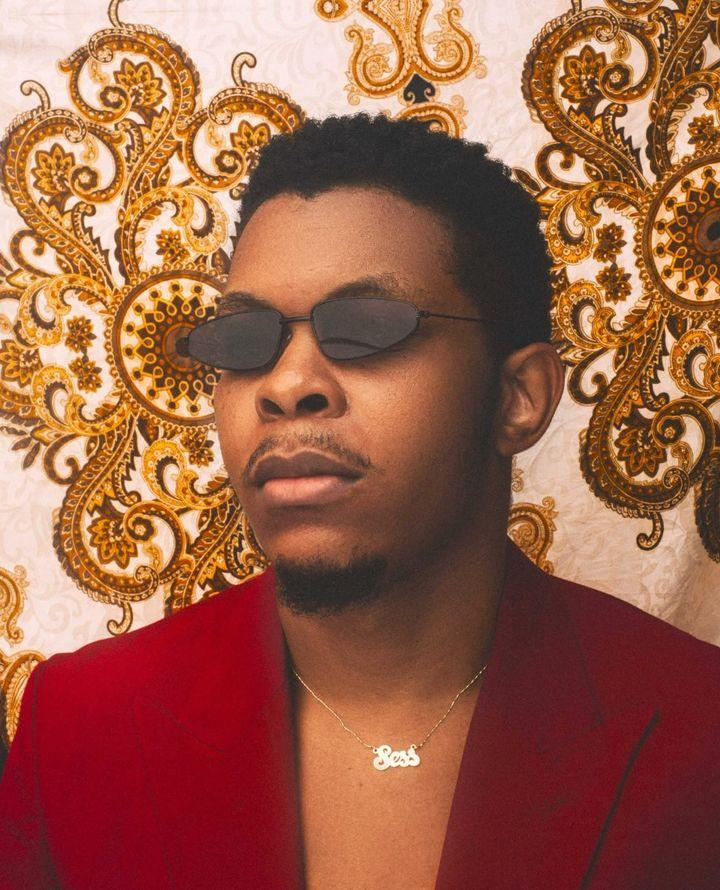

Background information
- Also known as: Sess The PRBLM Kid
- Born: Salami Oluwasesan Abbas; 26 November 1988 (age 37); Sagamu, Ogun State, Nigeria
- Genres: Afrobeats; pop; hip hop; contemporary R&B
- Occupations: Record producer; musician
- Instruments: Keyboard; synthesizer; drum; shekere; sampler
- Years active: 2015–present

Salami Oluwasesan Abbas (born 26 November 1988), better known by his stage name Sess, or Sess the Prblm Kid (stylised Sess the PRBLM Kid), is a Nigerian singer, songwriter, and music producer. He is known for solely producing Falz the Bahd Guy and Simi's joint EP, Chemistry.

He is notable with the mainstream sound watermark, "Sess, the Problem Kid", on his produced instrumentals.

== Early life and education ==
Salami Oluwasesan Abbas is from Offa, a town in the state of Kwara. He was born into a family of four children in Sagamu, Ogun State before moving to Ilorin, Kwara State.

Sess attended the University of Ilorin Staff School for elementary education before moving on to Best Legacy International High School then Thomas Adewunmi International college for secondary school. He then went on to study law at University of Ilorin, and was called to the Nigerian Bar in 2012.

== Career ==
He primarily produced Falz's second studio album Stories That Touch, and the entirety of the collaborative EP Chemistry by Falz and Simi.

In 2016, Sess was nominated for African Producer of the Year at Soundcity MVP Awards Festival.

In 2016, Stories That Touch won Album of the Year at the City People Entertainment Awards. In the same year, he won the New Discovery Producer of the Year and Afro Hip Hop Producer of the Year awards at The Beatz Awards 2016.

In 2018, he primarily produced the album Moral Instruction by Falz.

== Discography ==
=== Production ===
Year	Song	Featured artist(s)	Credit/Role
2015	Ello Bae	Falz	Producer
2015	Everybody (Thank You)	Falz	Producer
2015	Karishika Pt.2	Falz, MI, Showdem Camp	Producer
2015	Kawosoke	Falz	Producer
2015	Celebrity Girlfriend	Falz, Reekado Banks	Producer
2015	Time Difference	Falz	Producer/Artiste
2015	Clap	Falz, Reminisce	Producer
2015	Workaholic	Falz	Producer
2015	Karichika	Falz, Chigul, Phyno	Producer
2015	My People	Falz	Producer
2015	Soft Work	Falz	Producer
2016	Champagne Shower	Terry Apala	Producer
2016	Regards To Your Mumsi	Falz, Ajebutter, Fresh L	Producer
2016	Ayakata	Illbliss, Falz	Producer/Artiste
2016	Foreign	Falz, Simi	Producer
2016	Want To	Falz, Simi	Producer
2016	Show You Pepper	Falz, Simi	Producer
2016	Cinderella	Falz, Simi	Producer
2016	Chemistry	Falz, Simi	Producer
2016	Shake Body	Falz, Simi	Producer
2016	Enough	Falz, Simi	Producer
2017	That's What's Up	Terry Apala	Producer/Artsite
2017	Bestest	Vector	Producer/Artiste
2017	One Kain	Simi	Producer
2017	Wonder Woman	Yemi Alade	Producer
2017	Talku Talku	Yemi Alade	Producer
2017	Bahd Baddo Baddest	Falz, Olamide, Davido	producer
2017	Wehdone Sir	Falz	Producer
2017	Confirm	Falz, Sir Dauda	Producer
2017	My Money	Falz, Terry Apala	Producer
2017	Something Light	Falz, YCEE	Producer
2017	I Do It	Falz	Producer
2017	Falz, Wande Coal	Way	Producer
2017	Boogie	Falz, Sir Dauda	Producer
2017	Alright	Falz, Burna Boy	Producer
2017	Polised	Falz	Producer
2017	Baby Boy	falz	Producer
2017	Oyari	Yemisi Fancy	Producer
2017	Dirty Jwizz	DJ Consequence, Falz, Sess	Producer
2018	Faize Yi	Reminisce, Shody The Turn Up King, Falz	Producer
2018	Ajigijaga	Reminisce	Producer
2018	One Billie	Simi, Joh Makini	Producer/Artiste
2018	Overload	Skales	Producer/Artiste
2018	Boy Bad	YCEE	Producer/Artiste
2018	Orgiginal Gangster	Sess, Reminisce, Adekunle Gold	Producer/Artiste
2018	PRBLM	Sess, DJ Jimmy Jatt, Dapo Tuburna, Dremo, Boogey	Producer/Artiste
2018	Word Up	Sess, Mayorkun, DJ Consequence	Producer/Artiste
2018	Foreign Girls	Sess, Odunsi (The Engine)	Producer/Artiste
2018	Disco Light	Sess, Tomi Thomas, Niniola, DJ Crowdkontroller	Producer/Artiste
2018	Smooth Operator	Sess, Ladipoe, Shank	Producer/Artiste
2018	Hold My Baby	Omawumi, Falz	Producer/Writer
2018	Laba Laba	Tiwa Savage	Writer
2019	Immortal	Simi, Maleek Berry	Producer
2019	Before You Wake Up	Adekunle Gold	Producer
2019	Kelegbe Megbe	Adekunle Gold	Producer
2019	Follow Follow	Falz	Producer
2019	Hypocite	Falz, Dammie Vee	Producer
2019	Amen	Falz	Producer
2019	Brothers Keeper	Falz	Producer/Artiste
2019	E No Finish	Falz	Producer
2019	After All Said And Done	Falz	Producer
2019	Can't Buy My Love	DYO	Co-Producer
2020	Firewood	Adekunle Gold, Tekno	Producer
2020	Taka Sufe	Sess	Artiste
2020	Sango & Oya	Moelogo	Producer
2020	Ugly Parts Of Love	Moelogo	Producer
2020	No Longer Beneficial	Simi	Producer
2020	City Lights	Simi	Producer
2020	Triggered	Simi, Wurld	Producer
2020	Bites The Dust	Simi, Adekunle Gold	Producer
2020	Mais Qui	Shay Lia	Producer
2020	Toxic	Reminisce, Adekunle Gold	Producer
2021	Mercy	Falz	Producer
2021	Love Portion	DJ Neptune, Adekunle Gold	Producer
2021	Spotlight	Sess	Producer/Artiste
2021	Cover	Sess, PsychoYP	Producer/Artiste
2021	To Match	Sess, Teni	Co-Producer/Artiste
2021	Thunda	Sess, Falz	Producer/Artiste
2021	Trouble	Sess, Simi	Producer/Artiste
2021	International Love	Sess, Adekunle Gold	Producer/Artiste
2021	Beautiful	Sess, Yemi Alade	Producer/Artiste
2022	Revival	Sess	Producer/Artiste
2022	All Night	Falz	Producer/Writer
2022	Beautiful Sunflower	Falz, Tiwa Savage	Co-Writer
2022	Jara	Sir Dauda	Producer
2022	Fame	Mz Kiss	Producer
2022	Kilode	Mz Kiss	Producer
2022	Farawe (Far Away)	Mz Kiss	Producer
2022	Smoked Fish	Mz Kiss	Producer
2023	Sare (un)	Annie Daymar	Producer
2023	Overnight	Milly May Pod	Producer
2023	Possible	Quickteller Barz & Notes Top 6 & Salle	Producer

=== Albums, mixtapes and EPs ===
- Omo Murda
- Spotlight (EP)
- Prblm (Mixtape)

=== Singles ===
- "Original Gangster" by Sess featuring Adekunle Gold and Reminisce
- "Don't Worry" by Sess & Spax
- "To Match" by Sess and Teni
- "Revival" by Sess

== Awards and nominations ==
Year	Event	Prize	Recipient	Result	Ref.
2016	The Beatz Awards 2016	New Discovery Producer of the Year	Himself	Won	
2016	The Beatz Awards 2016	Afro Hiphop Producer of the Year	Himself	Won	
2016	The Beatz Awards 2016	Afro R&B Producer of the Year	Himself	Nominated	
2016	The Beatz Awards 2016	Afro Dancehall Producer of the Year	Himself	Nominated	
2016	Soundcity MVP Awards Festival	African Producer of the Year	Himself	Nominated	
2016	City People Entertainment Awards	Album of the Year (Stories That Touch by Falz)	Falz	Won	
2016	Nigeria Entertainment Awards	Album of the Year (Stories That Touch by Falz)	Falz	Nominated	
2017	Nigeria Entertainment Awards	Album of the Year (Chemistry by Falz and Simi)	Falz & Simi	Nominated	
2018	The Headies	Best Rap Album (27 by Falz)	Falz	Nominated	
2019	The Headies 2019	Album of the year (Moral Instruction by Falz)	Falz	Won	
2019	The Headies 2019	Rap album of the year (Moral Instruction by Falz)	Falz	Won	
2020	Africa Magic Viewers' Choice Awards	Best Soundtrack (Original Gangster feat. Adekunle Gold & Reminisce)	Himself	Nominated	
