= Ajebutter22 =

Nigerian singer and songwriter

- Born: Akitoye Balogun; January 6, 1991 (age 35); Surulere Lagos, Nigeria
- Genres: Alté; afropop; Afro-fusion
- Occupations: Singer; songwriter; record producer; rapper
- Works: Anytime Soon; Bad Gang
- Years active: 2009–present
- Label: Butternation
- Formerly of: Soyinka’s Afro
- Musical career
- Instruments: Vocals; keyboard

Akitoye Balogun (born January 6, 1991), known professionally as Ajebutter22 (or simply "Ajebutter") is a Nigerian singer and songwriter. He is associated with Nigeria’s alternative ("alté") music movement and gained recognition in the early 2010s.

He frequently collaborated with BOJ, alongside DRB LasGidi, Falz, and Cruel Santino. Ajebutter22 has received various accolades, including one nomination for Best New Act of the Year at the Nigeria Entertainment Awards, Two nominations at The Headies Award for Best Alternative Song in 2013 and Best Street-Hop Artiste In 2016. He also received a nomination for Best Afro-HipHop Video in 2016 at the Nigeria Music Video Awards.

Ajebutter22 has released three studio albums. The first of these, Anytime Soon (2014), became his first album to reach number one on iTunes and Apple Music, and it reached number 2 on the Canada iTunes Chart and number 5 in the United States. followed it with What Happens in Lagos (2017).

His third album, Soundtrack To The Good Life (2023), produced the regional Nigerian alternative airplay number-five single "Hear My Sound" featuring Mellissa and Not3s.

== Early life and education ==
Akitoye Balogun was born on January 6, 1991, in surulere Lagos, Nigeria. He began exploring music at a young age, writing his first songs around the age of 13 while in secondary school at International School Lagos. Growing up in Lagos, Balogun was exposed to a mix of Nigerian and international music, including artists such as Mode 9, Trybesmen, Eminem, Kanye West, 50 Cent, and Jay-Z. His early musical environment was also influenced by his family, particularly his sister, Taymi B, a radio presenter, with whom he formed a youth music group "Soyinka’s Afro" In 2009.

Balogun continued developing his craft after relocating to the United Kingdom to pursue his education. He studied petroleum engineering at Leeds University and later moved to Manchester to obtain a master's degree in engineering project management. It was during this time that he began formally recording and releasing his songs.

== Career ==
=== 2009–2013: Career beginnings ===
Ajebutter22 began recording music in the late 2010s while living in the United Kingdom. On January 22, 2012, He released "Senrenre," featuring his sister Taymi B. According to The Fader, the song is slang for something unnecessary. On July 27, 2012, He released the single "Omo Pastor". The song featured the singer BOJ (of DRB Lasgidi) and became a national hit. Earning him a nomination for Best Alternative Song at 2013 The Headies Awards.

In January 2013, during the second edition of Music Meet Runway fashion show, Ajebutter22 performed alongside D’banj, Wizkid, Naeto C, Iyanya, May D, and Burna Boy. He was featured by Nigerian rapper Flowsick on a Valentine-themed song "Scream" released on February 14, 2013. Later that month, on April 2, 2013, he released "Gbono", which features Dr Sid.

Ajebutter22 announced and performed his unreleased single "Gbono" during a live show at the DNA Concert in the United Kingdom on May 11, 2013. In July 2013, Ajebutter22 was featured on "Eja Tutu", a song from Ope. He released the tracks "Butter Was Here" and "Hire Killer" on October 30, 2013, with production from Adey and ODH. Later that year, he released "Celebrate in Advance" on November 20, 2013. The song was produced by Studio Magic, with additional production from Balogun himself and BOJ, and was accompanied by a music video.

=== 2014–2017: Anytime Soon, What Happens in Lagos ===
On February 3, 2014, during an interview and performance session on Ndani TV, Ajebutter22 performed "Church Mind" and "Humble Guy", and confirmed that he would release his debut album Anytime Soon, the following month. He released his debut studio album, Anytime Soon, In 2014 with guest appearances from Midnite BOJ, Wizboyy, Taymi B, and Dr Sid. The album also featured collaborations with members of the collective DRB LasGidi and production from Studio Magic. Critics noted that the album as a blend of reflective songs and vibrant party tracks, highlighting Ajebutter's wit and emotional depth. The album became Ajebutter22's first number one album on the iTunes and Apple Music and reached number 2 on the Canada iTunes Chart , and number 5 in the United States. On December 1, 2014, Ajebutter22 was co-featured alongside BOJ on the track "What U Want" by Naeto C.

In late 2015, He released new tracks. The tracks were named "Hard for Me", "Bisola Coker (featuring Bolly)", and "Girls in Badagry (Studio Magic Ft. Boj, Ajebutter 22 & King Zamir) Produced. By Platinum Toxx".

Two promotional singles, "Bad Gang" and "Abroad" was later released, on April 15, 2016 both featuring rapper Falz. "Bad Gang" was nominated for Best Street Hop Artiste of the Year at The 2016 Headies, as well as Best Afro Hip-Hop Video at the Nigeria Music Video Awards. A music video for the song was released on July 8, 2016.

In February 2017, Ajebutter22 performed at Jameson Connects Nigeria. Later that year, on November 10, 2017, he announced his 14-track album What Happens In Lagos revealing its release date. The project features artists including M.I Abaga, Falz, Dremo, and Maleek Berry.

"I wanted to document the different phases on the path to the 'Lagos Big Boy' status that seems to be the Lagos Dream, the album goes from a hopeful student to a struggling working class man and finally the big boy with a questionable past."

— Ajebutter22 on Plan for the Album

The album was released on November 24, 2017 under Jungle Entertainment Ventures., and featured a song "Lifestyle" featuring singer and producer Maleek Berry. He performed "Bad Gang" with Falz on December 20, 2017, at the Eko Convention Center as part of The Falz Experience. The event also featured performances from Simi, YCee, Davido, Tekno, Reekado Banks, and Yemi Alade. The concert was later made available on American streaming service Netflix.

=== 2018–2020: Make E No Cause Fight vol 1 and 2 ===
On March 26, 2018, Ajebutter22 and BOJ released the single "Yawa", which served as a track from their later collaborative project. In May 18, 2018, both artists released their joint extended play titled Make E No Cause Fight, Vol. 1, a five-track project produced by Spax, E-Kelly, and Studio Magic, with additional vocals from Tay Iwar. Later that month, He released a single titled "Ghana Bounce" . On November 2, 2018, Ajebutter22 was featured on two tracks "Independent Ladies" and "Damiloun" of Show Dem Camp's project, Palmwine Music: (alongside BOJ). On September 3, 2018, He released the remix for "Ghana Bounce", featuring Mr Eazi and Eugy. In late 2018 , He headlined the Porkoyum Food Fest alongside Teni the Entertainer, which featured performances from Odunsi, BOJ, and DJ Lambo.

On February 28, 2019, Ajebutter22 released the single "Lagos Love". Later that year, on November 25, 2019, he, alongside BOJ and Falz, announced their joint EP Make E No Cause Fight, Vol. 2. The project was released a week later, with "Ronaldo" serving as its lead single, accompanied by an official music video.

In early 2020, Ajebutter22 was featured on "Runaway Lover" by AKT. Weeks later, he collaborated with Mayorkun on the single "Ginger You", which was produced by Spax. He released "Big Man Talking" to his Instagram account in April.

=== 2021–present: Soundtrack To The Good Life and Make E No Cause Fight vol 3 ===
Following a brief hiatus from releasing solo full-length projects on 20 January 2023, Ajebutter22 released his third solo studio album, Soundtrack To The Good Life, under the Butternation imprint. The 15-track album served as his first solo LP in over five years, following 2017's What Happens In Lagos. The project featured collaborations with local and international artists, including Oxlade, LADIPOE, Ajebo Hustlers, Kida Kudz, Toby Shang, Joey B and KiDi. Later that year, Balogun reunited with BOJ to release Make E No Cause Fight 3.

== Personal life and other ventures ==
Ajebutter22 is an Arsenal FC fan and enjoys playing basketball and football on occasion. In addition to his career as a recording artist, he has also shown interest in cryptocurrency. During an interview with Do2dtun, he shared insights into his creative process and discussed his interests beyond music.

Endorsements and products

In summer 2014 he signed an endorsement deal as a ambassador for the hotel booking firm Jovago. Alongside Nigerian rapper Sasha P, the partnership was announced at an event in Lagos, involving both artists promoting and recommending the company’s hotel booking services to their audiences as part of its wider marketing strategy in Nigeria.

== Discography ==
=== Studio albums ===
Title	Details	Peak chart positions
Title	Details	NG
Anytime Soon	Release date: 22 February 2014; Label: Born Kings; Format: CD; Digital download; streaming	—
What Happens In Lagos	Release date: 24 November 2017; Label: Jungle Entertainment Ventures; Format: Digital download, streaming	—
Soundtrack To The Good Life	Release date: 20 January 2023; Label: 2022 Butternation; Format: Digital download, streaming	—

=== Collaborative EP ===
Title	Album details
Make E No Cause Fight (with BOJ)	Released: 17 May 2018; Label: Jungle Entertainment Ventures; Format: Digital download, streaming
Make E No Cause Fight 2 (with BOJ & Falz)	Released: 29 November 2019; Label: Jungle Entertainment Ventures; Format: Digital download, streaming
Make E No Cause Fight 3 (with BOJ)	Released: 17 November 2023; Label: Action Boyz, MOVES Recordings; Format: Digital download, streaming

=== Singles ===
==== As lead artist ====
List of singles as lead artist, with selected chart positions and certifications, showing year released and
Awards and nominations	Year	Peak chart positions			Certifications	Album
Awards and nominations	Year	NG	UK	UK R&B	Certifications	Album
"Senrenre" (featuring. Taymi B)	2012	—	—	—	—	Anytime Soon
"Omo Pastor" (featuring. BOJ)	2012	—	—	—	—	Anytime Soon
"Bad Gang" (featuring. Falz)	2016	—	—	—	—	What Happens in Lagos
"Hear My Sound" (Remix) (featuring. Mellissa & Not3s)	2023	5	—	—	—	Soundtrack To The Good Life
"—" denotes a recording that did not chart or was not released in that territory.

== Awards and nominations ==
Year	Event	Prize	Recipient	Result	Ref.
2013	Nigeria Entertainment Awards	Best New Act of the Year	Himself	Nominated	
2013	The Headies	Best Alternative Song	Falz for "Omo Pastor"	Nominated	
2016	Nigeria Music Video Awards	Best Afro-HipHop Video	"Bad Gang"	Nominated	
2016	The Headies	Best Street Hop Artiste of the Year	Ajebutter22 featuring Falz for "Bad Gang	Nominated	
