= 27 (Falz album) =

Studio album by Falz
- Released: 27 October 2017
- Length: 58:25
- Languages: Yoruba; English
- Label: Bahd Guys
- Producers: Sess; Demsa; Studio Magic; Spax; Juls; Maleek Berry

Falz chronology
Stories That Touch (2015)	27 (2017)	Moral Instruction (2019)

Singles from 27
- 1. "Bahd Baddo Baddest" Released: 7 April 2016; 2. "Wehdone Sir" Released: 13 January 2017; 3. "Jeje" Released: 7 June 2017; 4. "Something Light" Released: 18 August 2017; 5. "La Fête" Released: 20 October 2017

27 is the third studio album by Nigerian rapper Falz. It was released as a surprise album on 27 October 2017, Falz's birthday, by Bahd Guys Records. The album features guest appearances from Burna Boy, Olamide, Terry Apala, Davido, Ycee, Wande Coal, Sir Dauda, and Medikal. Its production was mainly handled by Sess the Prblm Kid, along with additional production from Demsa, Studio Magic, Spax, Juls, and Maleek Berry. 27 serves as a follow-up to Falz's sophomore album Stories That Touch (2015).

== Background ==
Following the success of Stories That Touch (2015), Falz began work on his third studio album, 27, which was released as a surprise on his 27th birthday, 27 October 2017. In an interview with Pulse Nigeria, Falz said the album had different working titles, including The Polish Villager, before he chose "27" to mark his 27th birthday. He called the surprise release a planned move to create excitement. As the album came together, it grew beyond his usual style to include more emotional and socially conscious songs.

== Composition ==
27 mixes Falz's playful style with more serious themes. On "Confirm", he mocks internet scammers and urges them to work for their success. "Child of the World" tells the story of a young woman facing abuse and hardship, offering a message of hope and warning against losing one's way. In "Polished", Falz pushes back at critics who call him “local,” reminding them he's more refined than he lets on. The album balances humor, social commentary, and party-ready tracks, with guest appearances from artists like Burna Boy, Wande Coal, and Maleek Berry.

== Singles ==
The album's lead single "Bahd Baddo Baddest" features Olamide and Davido. It was released on 7 April 2016 and was produced by Sess. "Wehdone Sir", also produced by Sess, was released as the album's second single on 13 January 2017. Directed by Clarence Peters, the track blends Falz's signature humor with sharp social commentary. It was inspired by a series of viral skits he posted online, which helped turn the phrase into a pop culture moment. The third single "Jeje" was released on 7 June 2017, and its Mex-directed music video was released two days later. "Something Light" featuring Ycee, the fourth single released off the album, was released on 18 August 2017. The video which features cameo appearances from Wofai Fada and Maraji, and was directed by Clarence Peters. The album's fifth single "La Fête" (celebration in French) was released on 20 October 2017. The song was produced by Demsa, with its music video directed by Clarence Peters.

== Critical reception ==
Wilfred Okiche of 360nobs found 27 a safe but uninspired follow-up that lacked the excitement and range of Falz's earlier work. He concluded it was “fair enough to pass muster, but far from the best work Falz could have made at this point in his career.” Joey Akan of Pulse Nigeria described 27 as a well-rounded project that showcased Falz's versatility while staying commercially appealing. He concluded that it “isn’t a landmark in Nigerian music, but it does a lot of things right,” giving it a rating of 3.5 out of 5.

=== Accolades ===
Awards and nominations for 27
Organization	Year	Category	Result	Ref.
The Headies 2018	2018	Best Rap Album	Nominated	

== Track listing ==
27 track listing
No.	Title	Writer(s)	Producer(s)	Length
1.	"Polished"	Folarin Falana	Sess	3:06
2.	"La Fête"	Falana	Demsa	3:06
3.	"Alright" (featuring Burna Boy)	Falana; Damini Ogulu	Sess	3:04
4.	"Jeje"	Falana	Studio Magic	3:30
5.	"Child of the World"	Falana	Spax	4:27
6.	"Boogie" (featuring Sir Dauda)	Falana; Oluwatobiloba Dawodu	Sess	4:13
7.	"The Lamba Song"	Falana	Studio Magic	3:16
8.	"Get Me"	Falana	Juls	3:12
9.	"Way" (featuring Wande Coal)	Falana; Oluwatobi Ojosipe	Sess	3:08
10.	"I Do It"	Falana	Sess	3:39
11.	"Something Light" (featuring Ycee)	Falana; Oludemilade Alejo	Sess	3:09
12.	"Le Vrai Bahd Guy"	Falana	Sess	2:49
13.	"My Money" (featuring Terry Apala)	Falana; Terry Ejeh	Sess	3:36
14.	"Confirm" (featuring Sir Dauda)	Falana; Dawodu	Sess	3:46
15.	"Next" (featuring Maleek Berry and Medikal)	Falana; Maleek Shoyebi; Samuel Frimpong	Maleek Berry	3:23
Total length:				58:25

== Release history ==
Release history and formats for 27
Region	Date	Format	Label
Various	27 October 2017	Digital download	Bahd Guys
