= Anytime Soon =

Studio album by Ajebutter22 and Studio Magic
- Released: 22 February 2014
- Length: 56:06
- Label: Born Kings
- Producer: Platinum Toxx

Ajebutter22 chronology
| Anytime Soon (2014) | What Happens in Lagos (2017) |

Singles from Anytime Soon
- 1. "Senrenre" Released: 22 January 2012; 2. "Omo Pastor" Released: 27 July 2012; 3. "Gbono" Released: 2 April 2013; 4. "Celebrate in Advance" Released: 14 November 2013

Anytime Soon is the debut studio album by Nigerian artist Ajebutter22 and record producing duo Studio Magic. It was released on 22 February 2014 through Born Kings Entertainment. The album features guest appearances from Midnite, BOJ, Wizboyy, Taymi B, and Dr Sid. Production was handled by Platinum Toxx.

== Background ==
Ajebutter22 and Studio Magic revealed the album art and track listing on 7 February 2014.

== Singles ==
The album's lead single "Senrenre" featuring Ajebutter's sister Taymi B was released on 22 January 2012. According to The Fader, "Senrenre" is slang for something unnecessary. The second single, "Omo Pastor", features BOJ. It was released on 27 July 2012. Anytime Soon's third single "Gbono" featuring Dr Sid was released on 2 April 2013. The fourth and final single "Celebrate in Advance" was released on 14 November 2013.

== Critical reception ==
Ayomide Tayo of Nigerian Entertainment Today described the album as a blend of reflective songs and vibrant party tracks, highlighting Ajebutter's wit and emotional depth. While noting some "entirely skip-worthy" songs, Tayo praised Ajebutter's optimism and unique vibe, and rated Anytime Soon a 3.5/5, concluding "Apart from the rookie mistakes on the album, Anytime Soon is a cool album filled with dance tracks and reflective songs made by a freshman willing to put in work to be one of the best". Wilfred Okiche of YNaija praised Anytime Soon by Ajebutter22 and Studio Magic for its fresh, breezy sound and daring approach, though he noted it often fell into monotony. Highlighting Ajebutter's unique voice, Okiche remarked, "His songs are for the thinking youth", but added that crafting another breakout hit might be challenging. Tinya Alonge of Culture Custodian described Anytime Soon as a stellar debut project that pushed boundaries with its cohesive concept and innovative sounds. He noted, "Ajebutter22's album might be the first concept and cohesive album, this side of the world," but pointed out that its release timing and reliance on a niche demographic might hinder broader success in Nigeria.

== Track listing ==
All tracks produced by Tosin "Platinum Toxx" Babalola of Studio Magic.
| No. | Title | Writer(s) | Length |
|---|---|---|---|
| 1. | "Humble Guy" | Akitoye Balogun | 3:52 |
| 2. | "Alangba" | Balogun | 3:19 |
| 3. | "No Story" (featuring Midnite) | Balogun; Midnite | 3:30 |
| 4. | "Omo Pastor" (featuring BOJ) | Balogun; Bolaji Odojukan | 3:44 |
| 5. | "Omo Ibo" (featuring Wizboyy) | Balogun; Isioma Ofuasia | 3:32 |
| 6. | "Dancing Competition" (featuring Platinum Toxx) | Balogun; Tosin Babalola | 4:54 |
| 7. | "Headphones (Skit)" | — | 0:52 |
| 8. | "Celebrate in Advance" | Balogun | 3:36 |
| 9. | "Okafor's Law" | Balogun | 2:50 |
| 10. | "Senrenre" (featuring Taymi B) | Balogun; Taymi B | 4:06 |
| 11. | "Follow the Leader" | Balogun | 3:39 |
| 12. | "Gbono" (featuring Dr Sid) | Balogun; Sidney Esiri | 3:27 |
| 13. | "Omo Mummy" | Balogun | 3:44 |
| 14. | "What Are We" | Balogun | 3:48 |
| 15. | "Church Mind" | Balogun | 3:42 |

Bonus tracks
| No. | Title | Writer(s) | Length |
|---|---|---|---|
| 16. | "Badman Freestyle" | Balogun | 3:31 |
| Total length: | | | 56:06 |

== Release history ==
Release history and formats for Anytime Soon
| Region | Date | Format | Label |
|---|---|---|---|
| Various | 22 February 2014 | CD; digital download | Born Kings |
