= Isinkan, Nigeria =

Traditional state and town in Ondo State, Nigeria

Isinkan Isikan
- Traditional state Town
- Location in Nigeria
- Coordinates: 7°11′54″N 5°2′55″E
- State: Ondo State
- Founder: King Obara (Obara dynasty); King Oroko (Oluroko dynasty) and King Ora (Iralepo dynasty)

Government
  - The Iralepo: Arulewolasi III

Isinkan (also known as Isikan) is a Nigerian traditional state. It is based in a town of the same name in Akure South Local Government Area of Ondo State. It is contiguous to the Akure Kingdom, and shares such a close proximity to that kingdom that visitors may not know that both are traditionally distinct entities.

Unlike most Yoruba states or towns that trace their history to Ile-Ife, the Isinkan oral tradition predates Oduduwa and Ile-Ife. The ruler of Isinkan bears the title of the "Iralepo of Isinkan".

== History ==
Based on oral tradition, the name of the community, "Isinkan", is a compound word for Usi and kan. Usi is the Yoruba for 'altar', while 'kan' literally means one. Usikan later morphed into Isinkan with modern Yoruba's preference for replacing the sound of 'u' with 'i', especially when the 'u' appears at the beginning of the word as in "Usikan". This can be compared with Ilesha (from Ulesha), Ipoti (from Upoti) etc.

Obara - a senior deity from the heavens - is said to have sought the permission of Obarisha (literally King of all Gods) - also known as Aseda or Olodumare - to create land upon a celestial space, to bestow upon the space a corporeal experience and to make it habitable for beings that were to be known as ira (iraye) or humans. He was granted permission. Ela Usi (also known as Ela Iwori and Akoda in Ifa Isinkan), a very senior deity, was assigned to support Obara by Olodumare. Ela in the discharge of his role pleaded with Olodumare to allow Obara to be paired with a beautiful female deity named Osorun as his mission companion because the latter was the only being who could wield the Edan akọkọ (power of creation or the first orb of power). Obarisha gave permission.

As the day of Obara's departure came nigh, the couple was handed a pair of magical ensembles, Edan akọkọ (held by Osorun) and the Ude akoko (a magical golden orb of time held by Obara) – both items still featuring prominently in the Iralepo's cognomen till this day – and allowed to journey on a fiery chain saddle (ewon agbana). When the party got to an expanse in space known as oriaye, Osorun (the female deity) was said to have stretched her hand, pointing the primordial Edan in a preferred direction whilst Obara then uttered some sacred words known in Isinkan as ‘ebibo’ for the gradual mystical emergence of land. In their attempt to descend from their aerial chain upon the emergent land, their chain saddle was tripped by Oko, an impish deity who sought to derail them. The resulting accident momentarily separated the two companions, with Obara landing on the small newly created portion of land while Osorun sank into the watery deep.

The portion of land that Obara landed on is a place known as Oba near Akure till today, while the site of Osorun's watery deep is known as Omi Yeye in Isinkan mythology and surrounded by the sacred grove known as Igbo Yeye, an ethereal forest, which was later consecrated in honour of the female deity, Yeye Osorun. In order for Obara to save his female companion, he quickly employed the second orb to manipulate time (akoko) to quicken the emergence and spread of land on oriaye which is today recognized as Earth. This Isinkan oral account of the creation of the earth as an experience is preserved in the ‘Oko s’oko s’igbaga’ or ‘Igbagba’ sang at the annual Yeye festival in Isinkan today.

=== Return Journey To Oke Isinkan ===
One of the ancestors of the Isinkans, Oroko, accompanied Obatala, Orunmila, Oranfe, and Obalufon to establish Ile-Ife according to the oral tradition of the Isinkan people. This was long before Oduduwa's later arrival in Ile-Ife. The oracle, however, instructed the followers of Oroko to return home to Isinkan because those left there forgot their duty to the sacred land. This informed the return journey to Isinkan by Ora and his people until they arrived at Oke Isinkan, the original settlement. Oke Isinkan is the present location of both federal TV and radio stations.

=== Later history ===
Due to Akure being made the provincial headquarters of the old Ondo Division in c. 1915 - Ekiti, Owo and Ondo divisions having been combined to form the Ondo Province, Akure began to expand and became bigger than its two closest contemporaries, Isinkan and Isolo. The boundaries now appear blurry to visitors but natives of the three towns know the traditional boundaries of their respective towns in spite of the expansion of Akure.

The close proximity of Isinkan, Isolo, and Akure to one another was brought about by the need to forge closer cooperation during the Edo invasion of Yoruba peripheral towns. The three separate communities thereafter moved closer following an appeal by Orudu, the then Deji, who was on the throne between 1735 and 1738. Orudu approached Okingoroye (father of Onaowuro I), the Iralepo of Isinkan, and the then reigning Osolo with his plea for assistance to help halt the incessant invasion of Edo, and they obliged him. The war against the Edo empire at some point required the digging of defensive trenches around the three proximate communities. The plea of Orudu facilitated the collaboration that resulted in the present interconnected relationship.

=== Yeye (Yeye Osorun), Igboye, Yeye Ogboo (Yeyelaro) et al. ===
Yeye Osorun is an immortal and the pre-eminent goddess of the Isinkan people. She is reputed to be the most powerful goddess on Earth. In Isinkan's oral tradition, she became betrothed to Obara following the aforementioned plea to Olodumare for Obara not to be allowed to go on his mission by himself. After her departure, as an assurance that she would remain ever with Isinkan, she promised to send her companion female deities to help Isinkan during crises. The deities she sent, which later became part of her grove, were Yeye Motasimilara, Eseluk'oba, and Yeyelaro, a very beautiful and dark woman that was also known as Yeye Ogboo. There is a forest in Yeye Osorun's grove called Igboye. In this forest are three rivers that are named after the three companion deities of Yeye, namely "Motasimilara", "Eyelaro" and "Eselu".

Whenever an Iralepo joins his ancestors, those in charge will go to Igboye to get water from the three rivers. It is forbidden for any Iralepo, or his family, to visit Igboye during his lifetime because a royal must not step into any of the rivers and then use the same feet to step into the palace.

=== Oriki of Isinkan ===
Iralepo mo'kunola irinwo gende
Olusi Obarisha
Usi kan sooso oke Isikan
Usi kan sooso agbaye
Omo Eselu ko'ba kee jagba Isinkan mimu
Jiwon jiwon oriade
Obara b'ale l'Oba
Akologbon ol'ifa akoko
Edan akoko ko pusi akoko
Elegbudu omi
Adimula oko oshorun
Uyi uyi uyi uyi!

Isikan ni l'Edan akọkọ
Oporuuru l'ori omi
Ude akọkọ ko p'usi akoko

Opo tiiri l'ajin
Opo tiiri s'oko Ado
Orisa lila s'Oba Ado jigbajigba

Omo edun kan ko m'eyin eyin rin
Ih ko se o ku o m'eyin eyin rin
Ih tori kan mo ba ta un l'oju otun ni
Omo a k'ole ebo m'eyin re s'efun
Omo a k'ole ebo m'eyin s'arigboran
Ko da k'ule ebo mo suhan
Efun a re 'ni l'ule re

Ugbogbo kuukuu no mu p'aja ogun, Ulu Isikan m'ebibo pa tere
Ajoji ba a j'aja ka m'olu pa l'ona Isikan

Omo ogbomo l'igi k'eje re sokoto udi re
Omo ogbomo l'igi k'eje re a san sooroso
Ajeji ko de sia l'ijo opa
Irin ereko li rin
We dede bo 'ra s'ile ku o m'ara a gbigi
Ije eyin sokoto no mu m'oni opa dun ju 'ra lo l'ona Isikan
Agboku itorin no mu ki 'ra l'aseyisamodun l'isikan

Omo olimariku tere kege kan jija obitun
Oke marikun no ti m'oni esho ye l'ule re o omo ekun
Omo oloshe gba ribiti kan le
Ogun kan li gba rere ko m'oho t'ile aba re
Omo ila godo, urokoo godo, olukaluku godogodo l'ule ara re

Omo olona meji k'obinrin wo t'otun
Omo amomo r'ubo k'eye re ya karufin ano
I arufin ebo a gbe o, 'banifon a gbe o o 'ye un 'ba un
Omo aledi mo pon 'yin
Aledi mo pon 'yin ona Isikan odo
K'ope ke l'adedi ti pon 'yin li ma s'oni l'ona Isikan
Ope oloju merindilogun ona Isinkan lii ah
Omo eleyin pe i ri ko yu
Omo eleyin pe ajagun
Eiye ri hun je l'ibomirin t'okikun li s'egbe
Omo amejiju rekereke s'odere r'erun odi
Osese oni suhan no p'aja un l'ule re.

== Obaship ==
House of Iralepo
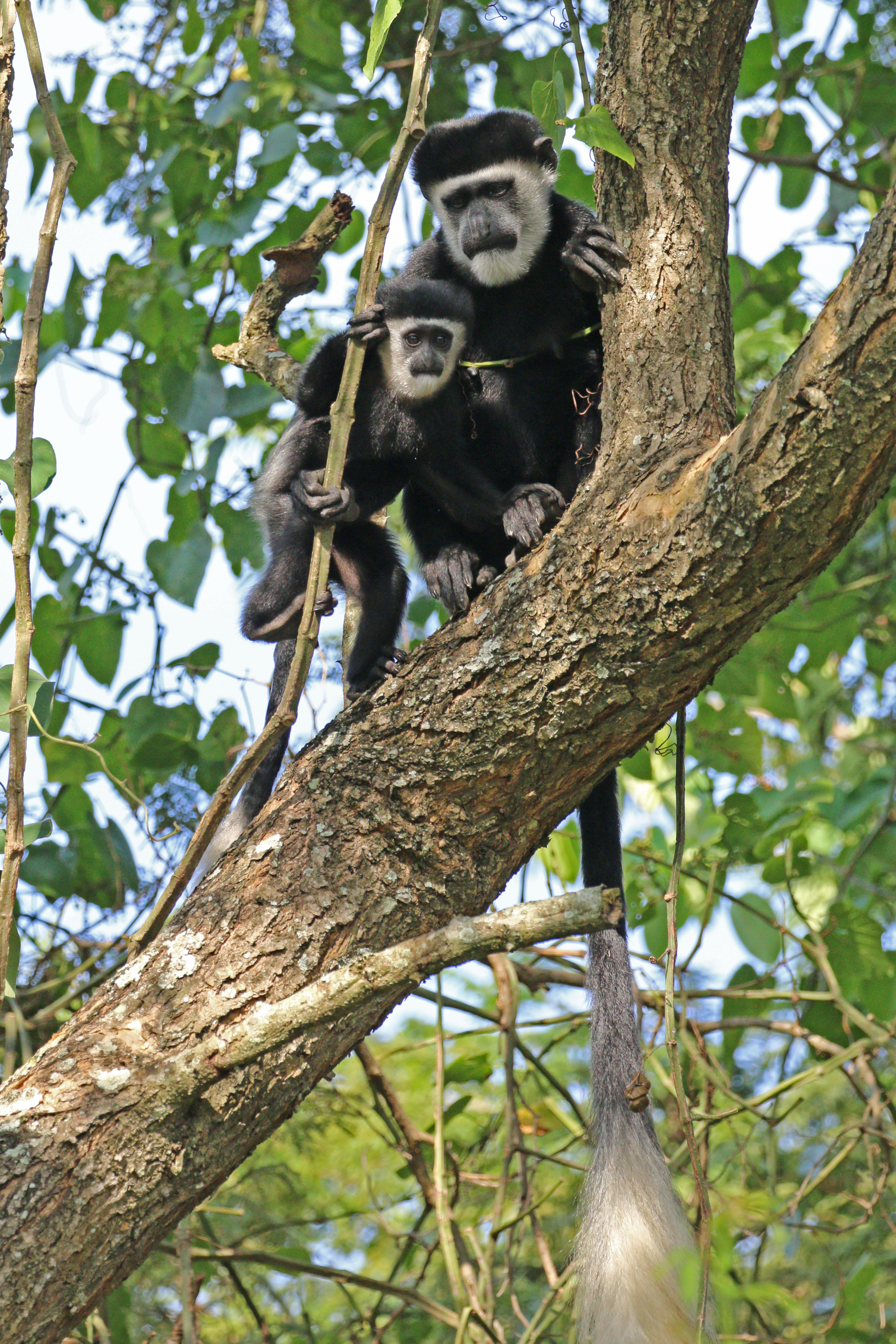
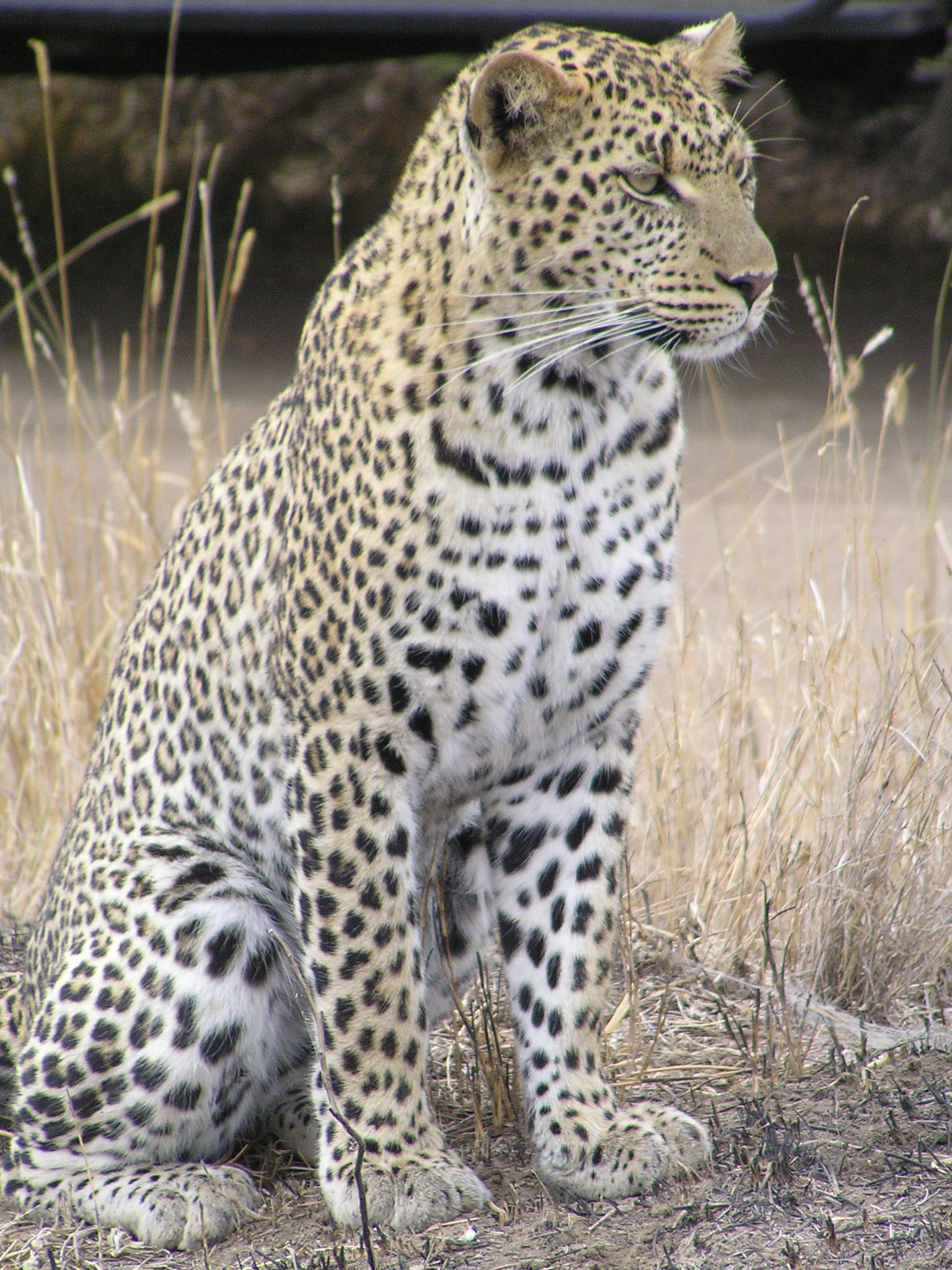
- Nigerian royal dynasty The Black-and-White Colobus Monkey, totemic beast of the river goddess Yeye Osorun and symbol of Isinkan royalty. The Leopard, royal pet of Prince Oluroko of Ile-Ife and heraldic beast of Isinkan royalty.
- Parent house: Varies: Sky gods (primordial); Orishanla (modern); Oodua (modern)
- Current region: Yorubaland
- Founded: 4500BC (Orile Isinkan)
- Founder: Obara, Oroko and Ora
- Current head: Areluwolasi III
- Titles: Oba Iralepo of Oke Isinkan; Oba Iralepo of Isinkan; Alodu Oba of Isinkan; Adele of Isinkan; Obara of Isinkan; Omowa of Isinkan; Olusi Obarisha of Isinkan; Eyesorun of Isinkan; Oloori of Isinkan
- Styles: Kabiyesi; Majesty; Royal Highness
- Connected families: Akure royal family
- Traditions: Ifá; Christianity; Islam
- Motto: Olusi Obarisha (Yoruba for "The Custodian of the altar to the God-King"); Omaayeekun (Yoruba for "The Tamer of the Leopard"); Elegbudu Omi (Yoruba for "The Source of the Living Water"); Omo Edun (Yoruba for "The Person of the Colobus Monkey")
- Cadet branches: Ariyo-Onaowuro; Adejuyigbe; Arulewolasi; (amongst others)

The Oba Iralepo of Isinkan is a duly recognized traditional king in Ondo State. The territories of Isinkan are autonomous, and the Iralepo of Isinkan is the prescribed authority over the Isinkan kingdom in line with the Ondo State Chiefs' Law. The Isinkan chieftaincy is distinct and separate from that of Akure, its closest neighbour.

=== Feud with the Akure Kingdom ===
Since the intervention of Britain in the colonial administration of Nigeria, the government began to formally recognize ancient kingdoms. Isinkan people agitated for a formal recognition of their traditional ruler, who had been relegated to a subordinate position due to the rise of Akure during the colonial period. A cold war between the Akures, the Isinkans and the Isolos then ensued over the issue, and lasted for many years. During the administration of Governor Olusegun Agagu, the Iralepo and the Osolo of Isolo were each finally granted the kingship recognitions. This was later reportedly overturned in court, putatively reverting them to the positions of 'quarter chiefs'.

This however changed in 2021 following the death of Oba Olu Ojo. A formal assessment of the Supreme Court ruling revealed that it merely upheld the Court of Appeal judgment. Unfortunately for the intention of the Akure rulers, the Court of Appeal judgment generously conceded the power to recognize the Iralepo as an Oba to the Governor of Ondo State and the power to review any resultant dispute to the Executive Council of Ondo State. Following this realization, all official records confirmed that the Ondo State Executive Council had indeed received formal submissions of dispute notices from the Iralepo of Isinkan and the Executive Council had formally reviewed the dispute thereafter and had duly recognized the Isinkan Chieftaincy - an action that was never challenged until any possibility of a challenge became statute barred. In October 2021, the Government of Ondo State directed the Akure South Local Government that the Chieftaincy of Iralepo of Isinkan must henceforth be managed and filled solely in line with the customs and traditions of Isinkanland in accordance with the previous Ondo State Executive Council decision in compliance with the Court judgments.

On Thursday 21 October 2021, in an Akure South Local Government supervised selection process, the Uharefa of Isinkan (who serve as the kingdom's kingmakers) selected Prince Oluwagbemiga Ojo as the Iralepo-Elect. This was countered the next day by the Deji of Akure, who appointed Prince Henry Olugbenga Adeyeye as High Chief Iralepo of Isinkan - a move that was roundly rejected by the people of Isinkan.

On 4 November 2021, however, the people of Isinkan peacefully completed the Obaship traditional rites without any rancor or violence, and formally crowned Oluwagbemiga Ojo as Oba Oluwagbemiga Ajimokunola Olofin-Adimula, Arulewolasi III, the 94th Oba of Isinkan and the 38th of the Ora dynasty. The new Oba subsequently entered and took over the affairs of the ancient palace of the Iralepo of Isinkan amidst fanfare. The traditional ruler immediately extended "hands of fellowship to the Deji of Akure". On 7 November 2021, it was widely reported that the Deji of Akure had sued the Governor of Ondo State and the Attorney General over the Iralepo stool. His case was subsequently thrown out. On July 14, 2022, Governor Oluwarotimi Akeredolu of Ondo State officially presented the staff of office and instrument of appointment to Oba Arulewolasi III.

An attempt by the Deji of the Akure kingdom to extend his annual Aheregbe festival to Isinkan in August 2022 was viewed by the people of Isinkan as a subtle territorial grab, and it was vehemently opposed by them. The youths refused to accept it, even after the Iralepo pacified them and advised them to yield to the government 'in the interests of peace'. To prevent future confrontations and ensure each traditional ruler stays in his domain, the Ondo State Government thereafter issued a strong directive to all traditional rulers to limit their activities to their markets only. The Deji promptly complied. The Ondo State Government subsequently confirmed that he fully complied with the state government's directive.

== List of Iralepos and Adeles of Isinkan ==
Solomon's knot, a quasi-heraldic symbol of Yoruba royalty.

According to tradition, Isinkan has had three regnal dynasties - the Obara dynasty (the Sky gods), the Oluroko dynasty, and the Oralepo (or Iralepo) dynasty. The Iralepo dynasty has produced thirty-eight kings. The Oluroko dynasty produced twelve kings (namely Oroko, Adin, Olofin, Owaran, Ojijigogun, Ina, Adimula Orisaale, Oro, Eselu, Uyi, Ifatinrin, and Ora). The Obara dynasty is divided into two; the known one hundred and sixteen names recited in Isinkan oral traditions, and the monarchs of the Sky god era - with names lost in antiquity but referenced in the town's unique forklore. The Oluroko and the Iralepo dynasties of Isinkan have thus jointly produced forty-nine male kings (Ora, the last king on the Oluroko line was the first king of the Iralepo dynasty).

This does not include four female kings who also ruled the land: Eye Motamisimi, Eseluk’oba, Arabi Omekunlaaye (the tamer of Leopards, a female warrior king that first cleared Ofosu of foreign invaders), and Yeye Ogboo.

The current dynasty is the House of Iralepo. Oluwagbemiga Ajimokunola Olofin Adimula, who succeeded Oba Olu Ojo, is the 94th Oba of Isinkan (of the three principal dynasties), discounting the names lost in antiquity. He is also the 38th Iralepo, and the 48th on the Ora-Oroko joint line. The following are the names of the Obas that have belonged to the Iralepo dynasty of Isinkan:

Start	End	Ruler
c.1150		Ora, the first of the Iralepo line and the last of the Oroko line
		Ora Ojikutu, 2nd Iralepo of Isinkan
		Aadin, 3rd Iralepo of Isinkan
		Obamakin Adinkoye, 4th Iralepo of Isinkan
		Orarinaye, 5th Iralepo of Isinkan
		Oragbemi, 6th Iralepo of Isinkan
		Elegbinsoro, 7th Iralepo of Isinkan
		Ajamugogun (Oyekua), 8th Iralepo of Isinkan
		Elegbudu, 9th Iralepo of Isinkan
		Egboro (Iyange), 10th Iralepo of Isinkan
		Elagbuaro, 11th Iralepo of Isinkan
		Elaboye, 12th Iralepo of Isinkan
		Edan (Edan Elerinla), 13th Iralepo of Isinkan
		Agesin, 14th Iralepo of Isinkan
		Owena (Ifamuagun), 15th Iralepo of Isinkan
		Owa Obamure, 16th Iralepo of Isinkan
		Olusi, 17th Iralepo of Isinkan
		Ipae-Akosa, 18th Iralepo of Isinkan
		Arabi-Omekunlaaye, 19th Iralepo of Isinkan
		Ofosu, 20th Iralepo of Isinkan
		Opotiiri, 21st Iralepo of Isinkan
		Akindun, 22nd Iralepo of Isinkan
		Amusi-Alaaye (Alayo), 23rd Iralepo of Isinkan
		Oreniwon, 24th Iralepo of Isinkan
		Akinna, 25th Iralepo of Isinkan
		Ajimokunola, 26th Iralepo of Isinkan
		Elesobaye, 27th Iralepo of Isinkan
		Aseso, 28th Iralepo of Isinkan
1675	1714	Arulewolasi, 29th Iralepo of Isinkan. (He was on the throne when Oba Gbogi was the Deji of Akure.)
1717	1731	Arisi-Amoyede, 30th Iralepo of Isinkan
1731	1780	Adegboyegun (Okingoroye), 31st Iralepo of Isinkan
1780	1816	Orubuloye (Atarioye), 32nd Iralepo of Isinkan
1817	1870	Onaowuro Ifagbade Ifatirin (Onaowuro I), 33rd Iralepo of Isinkan
1870	1905	Amudipote, 34th Iralepo of Isinkan
1919	1932	Obe Atejioye Onaowuro (Onaowuro II), 35th Iralepo of Isinkan
1932	1976	Aladetoyinbo (Otutujosun), 36th Iralepo of Isinkan
1976	1978	Regent: Princess Florence Aladetoyinbo (a daughter of Aladetoyinbo)
1978	2021	Joseph Olu Ojo Arulewolasi II, 37th Iralepo of Isinkan
2021	2021	Regent: Princess Margaret Ifedayo Ojo Omonije (a daughter of Arulewolasi II)
2021	present	Oluwagbemiga Ajimokunola Olofin-Adimula Arulewolasi III, 38th Iralepo of Isinkan

== Coronation rituals ==
A number of rites are performed during an Iralepo's installation. Some are unique to Isinkan, while others are also performed by other Yoruba clans. An Iralepo-elect is expected to undergo a nine-day Arapon (seclusion) ceremony. He will then climb the Okitiomoloore (hill) before entering the ancient palace. The actual coronation of the Iralepo is performed at the Igboye shrine in Isinkan. After the Iralepo leaves Igboye for the house of the chief called Arogun, he then moves from there to the Ashamo's house, where he spends a further seven days.

== Chieftaincy titles in Isinkan ==
The principal high chiefs of Isinkan are six in number (the Uharefa). They are the Olisa, the Odopetu, the Elemo, the Aro, the Ojomu, and the Sao. Other senior chiefs include the Adaja, the Elemikan, the Oshodi, the Eyelobirin, and the Asuda. The Chief Priest of Isinkan is the Omoran. All of these senior chiefs also have several chiefs within their jurisdiction who report to them.

The official youth group in Isinkan is the Oshugbo (or Oshugbo Usi). This is the apex youth cadre, and all Isinkan male children are automatic members of the Oshugbo Usi upon attaining the age of fourteen. In olden times, each fourteen-year old would hunt for three months unaccompanied by elders in what was then a dreaded forest known as Isharun. This was essentially a coming of age ritual.

== Notable citizens ==
- Oba Oluwagbemiga Ajimokunola Olofin-Adimula, the Iralepo of Isinkan (2021-date).
- High Chief Olumuyiwa Akinola-Aguda, the Olu of Kajola-Isinkan.
- Chief Olatunji Ariyomo, the Aare Adimula of Isinkan.
- Princess Funmi Falana SAN, a lawyer and member of the Isinkan royal family.
- Barrister Eyitayo Jegede, one-time Ondo State Commissioner and gubernatorial candidate.
- High Chief Henry Olugbenga Adeyeye, the Akure-appointed Iralepo.
- Chief Samuel Olatunbosun Shadare, a businessman and member of the Isinkan royal family.

== See also ==
- Akure Kingdom

== Sources ==
- The Iralepo royal family
- Pa Durojaiye Adesagba-Ariyo, the Olori-Omowa of the Iralepo dynasty
- The Estate of Chief S.O. Shadare
