= Cool FM Nigeria =

Radio station in Lagos and other parts of Nigeria

Cool FM
- Nigeria
- Frequency: 96.9 MHz

Programming
- Format: English Language

Ownership
- Owner: Cool FM

Links
- Website: Cool FM official website

Cool FM Nigeria is a Nigerian English-speaking radio station with frequencies across 4 of the 6 Geo-Political zones in Nigeria. It operates Cool TV and online radio. The radio station is pop and rock for adult audiences.

In 2019, Cool FM hosted an interview with Cardi B which was considered a scoop. The interview was live and with N6 and Temi Balogun. Cardi B was on her first tour of Africa, performing in both Nigeria and Ghana.

== Frequencies ==
- South West Zone (Lagos State): Cool FM 96.9 Lagos - founded October 1998
- South South Zone (Rivers State): Cool FM 95.9 Port Harcourt - founded November 2008
- North Central Zone (Abuja): Cool FM 96.9 Abuja - founded November 2001
- North West Zone (Kano State): Cool FM 96.9 Kano - founded October 2011
