= Abimbola Craig =

Nigerian actress and producer (born 1986)

Abimbola Roli Craig
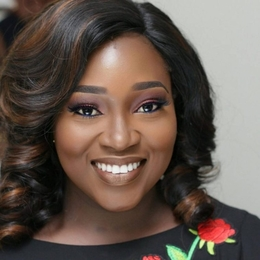
- Born: 3 November 1986 (age 39); Warri, Delta State, Nigeria
- Education: University of Buckingham
- Occupations: Actress; filmmaker; producer; director; YouTuber; content creator; lawyer
- Known for: Skinny Girl in Transit

Abimbola Craig (born 3 November 1986) is a Nigerian Nollywood actress and producer who starred as Tiwalade in Skinny Girl in Transit. She was originally slated to be the producer of Skinny Girl in Transit but ended up playing the lead role. Since the first season, Abimbola has not only acted as the lead but has also produced Seasons 2 through 6 of the series. In addition, Craig co-produced the box office hit Sugar Rush in 2019, alongside Jadesola Osiberu.

== Career ==
Craig previously worked as Head of Production at Ndani TV Communications, which is also known as Ndani TV, and produced shows including Skinny Girl in Transit, Phases, Rumor Has It, The Juice, and Game On. Craig also runs an online website and social media account where she regularly posts short videos about life issues or hot gists. She was part of the remake of Glamour Girls.

== Filmography ==
- My Wife & I (2017) as Wife
- Skinny Girl in Transit (2015) as Tiwalade
- Isoken (2017) as Yinka
- Who lived at number 6 (2021) as Amina
- Phases
- Rumor Has It
- The Juice
- Game On

== Awards and nominations ==
Year	Award	Category	Work	Result	Ref
2022	Africa Magic Viewers' Choice Awards	Best Short Film or Online Video	Fractured	Nominated	
