= Oluwagbemiga Ajimokunola Olofin-Adimula =

Nigerian traditional ruler

Oba Oluwagbemiga Ajimokunola Olofin-Adimula (born Oluwagbemiga Ojo, October 2, 1972) is a Nigerian lawyer and traditional ruler. Since 2021, he has served as the Iralepo of Isinkan, a traditional state in Akure South Local Government Area of Ondo State, Nigeria.

His position as a monarch has been challenged by a neighboring ruler, the Deji of Akure Oba Aladetoyinbo Ogunlade Aladelusi. The case he instituted is currently in the Nigerian courts.
