= Skinny Girl in Transit =

Nigerian comedy webseries

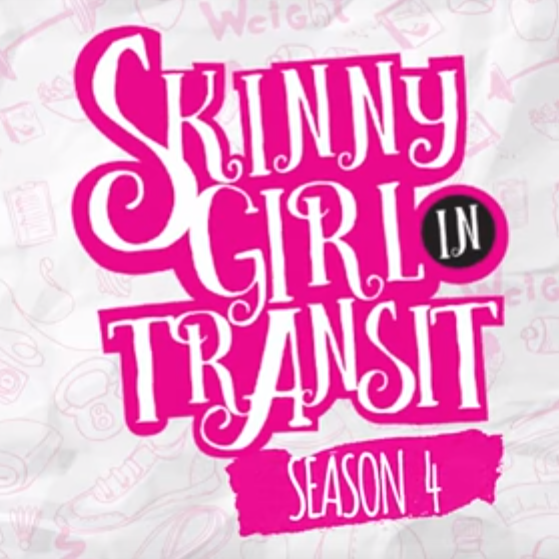
- Skinny Girl in Transit poster
- Genre: Comedy
- Created by: Temi Balogun
- Written by: Dami Elebe (season 1 - 4); Bunmi Ajakaiye (season 4 - 7); Jadesola Osiberu (season 3); Tope Salu (season 5); Lani Aisida (season 5 - 6); Abdul Tijani-Ahmed (Season 7); Ifeanyi Barbara Chidi (Season 7)
- Starring: Abimbola Craig; Ngozi Nwosu; Sharon Ooja; Ayoola Ayolola; Chioma Okoli
- Country of origin: Nigeria
- Original language: English
- No. of seasons: 7
- No. of episodes: 79

Production
- Executive producer: Guaranty Trust Bank
- Producers: Folu Ogunkeye (season 1); Abimbola Craig (season 2 - 6); Jadesola Osiberu (season 2 - 3); Agnes Marquis (season 3); Vincent Nwachukwu (Season 7); Abdul Tijani-Ahmed (Season 7)
- Production locations: Lagos, Lagos State, Nigeria
- Running time: 7—10 minutes (Season 1); 15—22 Minutes (Season 2 - 3); 30-50 Minutes (Season 4 - 5)
- Production company: Ndani Communications

Original release
- Network: Ndani Tv
- Release: 16 July 2015 – present

Skinny Girl in Transit is a Nigerian Comedy webseries by NdaniTV. The first episode was released on NdaniTV's YouTube page on 16 July 2015. The idea for the series was pitched by Temi Balogun. The series returned to NdaniTV for its fifth season on November 9, 2018 after being on hiatus for over a year. The series returned again for the sixth season, the first episode of season 6 aired on February 14, 2020.

== Plot summary ==
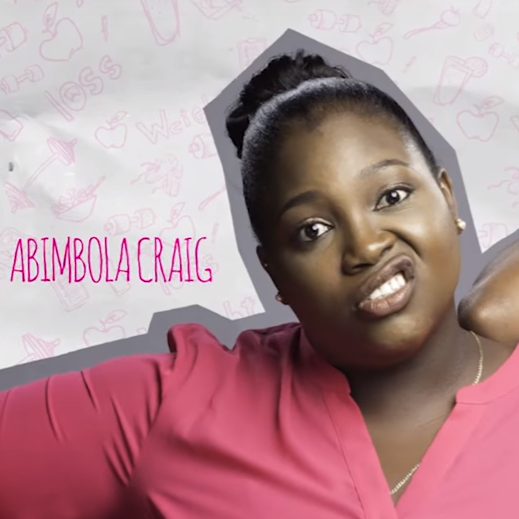
Abimbola Craig in Skinny Girl in Transit

Skinny Girl in Transit is a web series produced by Ndani TV, and as the name implies, it is a comedy about a young Nigerian woman and her efforts to lose weight. In the pilot episode, Tiwalade, played by Abimbola Craig, is woken up from a pleasurable dream by her mother, played by Ngozi Nwosu. Her mum wastes no time in informing her that the Holy Spirit ministered to her and the message conveyed was that Tiwalade should lose weight, therefore furthering her hope of finding a husband. Tiwalade's mum performs a series of dramatic gestures and makes several grand statements to emotionally blackmail Tiwalade into agreeing to lose weight. And Tiwalade, who is aware that she is overweight, thinks ‘why not, how hard could it be? However, losing weight turns out to be more strenuous than she originally assumed. In addition, Tiwalade has to deal with a mother who is like a dog with a bone, a sister, played by Sharon Ooja, who is pretty, slim and shallow, and a love-life that is less than appealing.

== Episodes ==
- Season 1: 12 Episodes
- Season 2: 10 Episodes
- Season 3: 9 Episodes
- Season 4: 12 Episodes
- Season 5: 12 Episodes
- Season 6: 12 Episodes
- Season 7: 10 Episodes

== Cast ==
- Abimbola Craig as Tiwalade
- Ngozi Nwosu as Mama Tiwa
- Sharon Ooja as Shalewa
- Norbert Young as Baba Tiwa
- Kenneth Okolie as Femi
- Ayoola Ayolola as Mide
- Bisola Aiyeola as Didi
- Ini Dima-Okojie as Hadiza
- Chioma Okoli as Wosilat
- Beverly Naya as Derin
- Timini Egbuson as Mohammed
- Sophie Alakija as Farida
- Nick Mutuma as Chris
- Ayo Adesanya as Aunty Dupe
- Deyemi Okanlawon as Pastor Braithwaite
- James Gardiner as Kwame
