= Akinola Aguda =

Nigerian lawyer and judge (1923–2001)

- Born: 1923; Akure, Southern Region, British Nigeria
- Died: 5 September 2001 (aged 77–78)
- Occupations: Inaugural Chief Justice of Botswana; Nigerian Jurist
- Known for: Human rights, social justice
- Parents: Elijah Aguda (father); Deborah Fasu (mother)
- Awards: OFR
- Scientific career
- Workplaces: Obafemi Awolowo University; University of Lagos

Akinola Aguda (1923 – 5 September 2001) was a Yoruba Nigerian jurist and a Chief Justice of Botswana. Prior to becoming Chief Justice, he was a lawyer and a High Court judge in Nigeria's Western Region. He was the first indigenous African to head the position of Chief Justice in Botswana.

Throughout his legal career, he was known as a cerebral jurist and lawyer, who embraced radicalism especially during period of military rule in Nigeria. It is believed this may have resulted in his exclusion as a member of the supreme court of Nigeria.

== Early life and education ==
Justice Aguda

Justice Aguda was born in Akure, Nigeria, to the family of Elijah Ojo Aguda and Deborah Fasu, a prominent Anglican couple in Akure. His father, Elijah Ojo Aguda, was originally from Ilara-Mokin and was born into a polygamous family with a longstanding background in warrior traditions, herbalism, and traditional healing in Ilara-Mokin. His paternal family was also connected to several prominent Ilara-Mokin families and lineages, including Fakinlede, Obomuyide, Jaati, Ajayi, and Bamisiro.

Elijah Ojo Aguda was the son of Olokunloye, the Sasere of Ilara-Mokin, whose mother was a worshipper of Olokun. Olokunloye’s father, Fadulu, also held the title of Sasere. Through his great-grandfather Fadulu, Justice Aguda was a descendant of Ajiperi Igodo, the Alara, or king, of Ilara-Mokin in the mid-18th century.

Following the death of his father,

, where he subsequently grew up and established his family. Justice Aguda was therefore born in Akure while retaining his paternal ancestral roots in Ilara-Mokin.

Aguda studied at St David’s Primary School, Akure, for his primary education and later attended Government College, Ibadan, for his secondary education.[1] Originally, he wanted to become a doctor or an engineer, but he was not particularly interested in chemistry, an important subject required for admission into medical school. He left medical school after his first year and subsequently tried teaching.

On the advice of Obafemi Awolowo, Aguda changed his career direction and decided to study law. He studied Law at the University of London and was called to the bar in 1952.

== Career ==
After completing his studies, he entered private practice in the chambers of the distinguished Nigerian lawyer, Ayo Rosiji. but later transferred to the legal department of the western region of Nigeria, and became the Pupil Crown Counsel. Soon thereafter, he was made Crown Counsel in 1955 and in 1968, he became the acting solicitor general of the Western region. On 3 February 1972 he was appointed the first African Chief Justice of Botswana, concurrently, he was also a judge of the Court of Appeal of Swaziland, Botswana and Lesotho. After, leaving the supreme court in 1975, he returned to Nigeria and continued his judicial career as Chief Judge of Ondo State. In 1976, he was a leading member of the committee that recommended Abuja as the capital of Nigeria. He retired from civil service in 1978 and became the director of the newly created Nigerian Institute of Advanced Legal Studies at the University of Lagos. As director of the Nigerian Institute of Advanced Legal Studies, Aguda assumed a new role, as a critic of corruption and governance in Nigeria and Africa. To Aguda, the lack of thorough knowledge of judicial norms and precedents by the common African man or woman leads to the abuse of vital human rights by the government. A situation that can be fuelled by poverty, which allows many to rot in jails without due process or even a notice of trial as they do not have the money to get an astute lawyer or the connections to effect changes to their situation. His defence of the right of suspects was a crucial issue that was prominent during his days as a judge. In 1968, in the case of Agbaje vs the Western Government of Nigeria, he wrote a comment that is still relevant in today's Nigerian judicial system.

In a democracy like ours, even in spite of the national emergency in which we have been for the past three years, I hold the view that it is, to say the least, high-handed for the police to hold a citizen of this country in custody in various places for over ten days without showing him the authority under which he is being held or at least informing him verbally of such authority.

He also sought for removal of economic barriers in the criminal justice system, concurrently with a speedy trial and to put omnipotent leaders under the law not above it.

== Personal life ==
He married his first wife in 1952, and controversially took on a mistress two years afterwards.

His descendants are currently led by High Chief Olumuyiwa Akinola-Aguda, the reigning Olu of the community of Kajola in Isinkan, Nigeria.
