= This Is Nigeria =

Song by Falz

Single by Falz
- Released: 25 May 2018
- Recorded: 2018
- Genre: Afrobeats, Political hip hop
- Length: 3:43
- Label: Bahd Guys Records
- Songwriter: Folarin Falana

Falz singles chronology
"Foreign" (2018)	"This Is Nigeria" (2018)	"Child of the World" (2018)

Music video
- "This Is Nigeria" on YouTube

"This Is Nigeria" is a song by Nigerian rapper Falz, released on 25 May 2018. It is a cover of Childish Gambino's "This Is America". Falz's father, Femi Falana, performed background vocals on the track. "This Is Nigeria" addresses a number of societal issues prevalent in Nigeria, including SARS brutality, codeine abuse and unrestrained killings. The song's accompanying music video was directed by Prodigeezy and produced by Wande Thomas.

== Composition ==
According to Falz, the song "addresses numerous political and social ills", and is an attempt "to spark a reaction in the positive direction". The video highlights Nigeria's issues with violence, political corruption, policing, and organized religion.

== Music video ==
The accompanying music video for "This Is Nigeria" was directed by Prodigeezy. Filmed in an empty warehouse, the video depicts a Fulani man committing murder, Chibok/Dapchi girls dancing, young men getting high off codeine, and undergraduate students being assaulted by the Special Anti-Robbery Squad. The music video has received over 20 million views on YouTube. American rapper Sean Combs uploaded the music video onto his Instagram page and captioned it with the hashtag "#Nigeria LETS GO!".

In an interview with Hello Nigeria, Falz discussed the inspiration behind the video. On 5 June 2018, the Muslim Rights Concern demanded that Falz withdraw the music video or face legal action. He was also asked to apologize for using women wearing hijab while dancing Shaku Shaku. This triggered a viral outrage on social media. Nigerian Twitter users showed support for the video and also advised the rapper not to take down the video. Falz's management later released a statement stating that the music video will not be taken down.
