= Chemistry (Falz and Simi EP) =

EP by Falz and Simi
- Released: 27 October 2016
- Recorded: 2016
- Genres: Afro pop; Afrosoul; afro hip hop; afrobeats
- Length: 23:00
- Labels: Bahd Guys; X3M
- Producers: Folarin Falana; Steve Babaeko (both exec.); Sess

Falz chronology
| Stories That Touch (2015) | Chemistry (2016) | 27 (2017) |

Simi chronology
| Ogaju (2008) | Chemistry (2016) | Simisola (2017) |

Chemistry is a collaborative extended play (EP) by Nigerian rapper Falz and singer Simi. It was jointly released on 27 October 2016, by Bahd Guys Records and X3M Music.

== Background and promotion ==
Prior to the release of the EP, it was rumored that both Falz and Simi were dating. The rumours were fueled as a result of their collaborative singles "Jamb Question" and "Soldier". The promotion of the EP saw them release pre-wedding-themed photos on social media before finally announcing the release of the EP in an industry night event, where they jointly performed.

== Critical reception ==
Professional ratings
Review scores
| Source | Rating |
|---|---|
| Pulse Nigeria | 4/5 stars |
| Nigerian Entertainment Today | 4/5 stars |
| Filter Free Nigeria | 4/5 stars |

Upon its release, Chemistry was met with positive reviews from mainstream music critics. Chiagoziem Onyekwena of Filter Free Nigeria scored the album 80%, stating: "If the musical currency of love songs is believability, then Chemistry is an extremely rich EP". Oghene Michael of 360 Nobs described the project as an "experiment of the word art". Respected music critic, Joey Akan of Pulse Nigeria highlighted the marketing aspect of the project, stating that the duo "capitalized on the very sentiments of the public to create a product that can be sold for value". He went on to give the EP 4 stars out of 5, describing it as "a celebration of a working relationship that people spend a lifetime trying to find and hold on to".

In a mixed review, BellaNaija's Adetoye Shokunbi argued that "Chemistry is an album larger than itself", before he went on to notice that "Simi’s continued biting of Bollywood melodies and Falz’ predictable Yoruba-accented shtick may raise questions about authenticity and freshness". Taofik Bankole of Nigerian Entertainment Today was critical about the production and arrangement of the EP, describing it as "top notch" and rating it 4 out of 5 stars, stating that, "this project tells us what we already know about Falz and Simi’s music, [....], the world already knows no duo will ever have a better chemistry".

== Track listing ==
All tracks are written by Folarin Falana and Simisola Ogunleye.

| No. | Title | Producer(s) | Length |
|---|---|---|---|
| 1. | "Foreign" | Sess | 3:02 |
| 2. | "Want To" | Sess | 3:46 |
| 3. | "Show You Pepper" | Sess | 3:03 |
| 4. | "Cinderella" | Sess | 2:55 |
| 5. | "Chemistry" | Sess | 3:48 |
| 6. | "Shake Your Body" | Sess | 3:46 |
| 7. | "Enough" | Sess | 3:09 |
| Total length: | | | 23:00 |

== Personnel ==
- Folarin Falana – primary artist, writer
- Simisola Ogunleye – primary artist, writer
- Sess – production (tracks 1, 2, 3, 4, 5, 6, 7)
- TCD Photography – photography

== Release history ==
List of release dates, showing region, formats, label, editions and reference
| Region | Date | Format(s) | Label | Edition(s) | Ref. |
|---|---|---|---|---|---|
| Worldwide | 27 October 2016 | Digital download | BahdGuys Records; X3M Music | Standard | |
