= Maryam Saleh =

Egyptian singer-songwriter

- Born: 3 November 1985 (age 40); Beni Suef, Egypt
- Citizenship: Egyptian
- Occupations: Actress, singer

Maryam Saleh (Arabic: مريم صالح, romanized: Maryam Ṣāliḥ; born 1985), full name Maryam Saleh Saad (Arabic: مريم صالح سعد, romanized: Maryam Ṣāliḥ Sa'd) is an Egyptian singer and songwriter (including psychedelic rock and trip-hop) and actress.

== Life ==
Her father was the stage writer, theater director and critic Saleh Saad, with whom she worked as an actress and directing assistant at a young age. He died in a fire in 2005 in Beni Suef. Among her father's friends was Sheikh Imam, who had great influence on her.

As an actress, she starred in plays such as Laila Soliman's Lessons in Revolution, a couple of short films and Ibrahim El-Batout's film A Shams (2008), for which she also sang the title song.

Around 2008, she founded her band Jawaz Safar, in which only the instruments oud and tabl were played. In 2008 she founded the band Baraka, the ua the Sheikh Imam songs Nixon Baba, Valery Giscard d'Estaing Ya Wad Ya Yu Yu, ya wādd yā yū yū and Ya wādd yā yū yū El-Bahr Byidhak Leh "('Why does the sea laugh') covered and later sung by her sister Nagham Saleh.

Since 2010 she works together with the Lebanese musician Zeid Hamdan; the music was described as Arab trip-hop.

Maryam Saleh starred as the prostitute Mona Farkha in the 2011 Egyptian short film A Tin Tale (Arabic: حدوتة من صاج, Hadouta Men Sag ; Director: Aida El-Kashef) as part of the Dubai International Film Festival.
