= Funmi Falana =

Nigerian lawyer and activist

Omoba Funmi Falana SAN
- Education: University of Benin, University of Lagos.
- Occupation: Legal Practitioner
- Organization(s): Women Empowerment and Legal Aid (WELA)
- Known for: women's rights activist
- Spouse: Femi Falana
- Children: Falz, amongst others
- Website: FalanaFalana

Funmi Falana SAN is a Nigerian legal practitioner and women's rights activist.

== Personal life and education ==
Falana was born into the Nigerian chieftaincy system, being a member of the ruling dynasty of the Iralepo of Isinkan, and she attended St. Louis Girls’ Grammar School, Akure, Ondo State. She obtained her bachelor's degree in physics from the University of Benin, and later her law degree (LL.B) at the University of Lagos. Falana later obtained her master's degree (LL.M) from the University of Lagos as well.

In 2024, she received a chieftaincy title from the Isinkan community.

Falana is married to Femi Falana, a Nigerian activist and lawyer; and mother to Falz, a Nigerian recording artist and actor.

== Career ==
Falana currently serves as the National Director of Women Empowerment and Legal Aid (WELA), a non-governmental organization that defends the rights of women and children. She belongs to some professional and leadership associations within and outside Nigeria and is a member of the Nigerian Bar Association, the West African Bar Association, the International Bar Association, and the Chartered Institute of Arbitrators.

== Leadership and activism ==
In her capacity as the current National Director of Women Empowerment and Legal Aid (WELA), a non-governmental organization, Falana participates in activism. She has led some campaigns against rape, women marginalisation and participation in politics, gender based, policy and decision-making. Through her organisation, she challenged Regulation 124 of the Police Act which prohibited female officers from getting married until after three years of service, and the court declared the provision was unconstitutional and discriminatory against women, so it was null and void,

In a letter dated January 28, 2021 and titled “Request To Recall Dismissed Pregnant Police Officer”, Falana, as the Chairperson of WELA, asked the Inspector General of Police (IGP) Ibrahim Adamu to reinstate Corporal Olajide Omotola of the Ekiti State Police Command who was dismissed for getting pregnant out of wedlock. She said she would challenge the dismissal of Mrs. Omotola at the National Industrial Court of Nigeria (NICN) and pray for the annulment of Regulation 127 made pursuant to the Police Act, 2020 if the police authority fails to reinstate her within a reasonable time.
