= Moral Instruction =

Studio album by Falz
- Released: 15 January 2019
- Recorded: 2018
- Genres: Hip hop; Afrobeat
- Length: 24:36
- Label: Bahd Guys Entertainment
- Producers: Sess; Chillz; TMXO; Willis

Falz chronology
27 (2017)	Moral Instruction (2019)

Singles from Moral Instruction
- 1. "Talk" Released: January 12, 2019

Moral Instruction is the fourth studio album by Nigerian rapper Falz. It was released on January 15, 2019, by Bahd Guys Entertainment. The album was recorded entirely in Nigerian Pidgin and samples some of Fela Kuti's music. Its production was primarily handled by Sess, with additional production from TMXO, Willis, and Chillz. Moral Instruction features collaborations with Demmie Vee, Chillz, and Sess. The album's release was preceded by "Talk", a socio-conscious song that addresses critical events. Moral Instruction won Best Rap Album and Album of the Year at The Headies 2019.

== Background and promotion ==
Falz recorded Moral Instruction in 2018 and characterized it as "a movement, re-education, and re-orientation". Thematically, the album addresses societal issues such as corrupt politicians, corruption, police brutality, prostitution, social injustice, and internet fraud. Moral Instruction is seen as a continuation of the single "This Is Nigeria", a political rap song that quickly gained popularity due to its direct remarks. The cover art for Moral Instruction was created by Nigerian artist Lemi Ghariokwu, a long-time Fela collaborator. Falz held an album listening party at the Landmark Towers in Victoria Island, Lagos. Guests who attended the event were dressed in school uniforms and gifted stationery materials.

The album's lead single, "Talk", was released on January 12, 2019; it sheds light on greedy politicians and ineffective presidency. On the record, Falz talks about the Muslim Rights Concern's failure to appear in court several months after serving him a 7-day ultimatum to withdraw the video for "This Is Nigeria". He also spoke about the misappropriation of public funds by political leaders, and exposed pastors who buy private jets in spite of the extreme poverty their congregations endure on a daily basis. The accompanying music video for "Talk" was released on January 10, 2019. At the beginning of the video, a young boy is shown playing a video game with Falz as his main character. The game allows the boy to use the character he selected to either "Save Nigeria", "Relocate to Yankee", or "Join Gang". When the boy selects the first option, Falz is thrust into the real world, where he aspires to be a judge and politician.

On January 20, 2019, Falz released "The Curriculum", an eight-minute short film that highlights all the songs on the album. The film stars Falz, Yung Willis, Kunle Oshodi-Glover Jr, and Bolly Lomo, and features cameo appearances from Olumide Oworu, Nkem Marchie, Nancy Isime, and Jemima Osunde. The opening scene, which depicts students mistreating one another, hints at Nigerians' lack of concern for their compatriots. Scenes that follow depict armed students gathering at night and carrying out a ritual. On April 9, 2019, Falz released the Iyobosa Rehoboth-directed visuals for "Hypocrite". In it, he plays an election official whose polling unit is ambushed by political thugs before voting is declared to begin.

== Composition ==
Moral Instruction opens with "Johnny", a song that addresses Nigeria's insecurity and reckless killings. Falz depicts a vivid story of a NYSC member who was shot in Abuja by a police officer in July 2018. "Follow Follow" is a blend of Afrobeat and hip hop. Interspersed with Fela's "Zombie", the song is about one discovering their identity amidst social media's distractions and celebrity mania. "Hypocrites" tackles the conceited lifestyle of Nigerians, particularly that of religious leaders. In "Talk", Falz discusses critical issues and counsels Nigerian youth to be wary of avaricious politicians. "Amen" is an evaluation of religion and the double standards associated with it.

In "Brother's Keeper", Falz explains the need for individual accountability and the connections between Nigeria's issues. "Paper" takes aim at ritualistic culture, internet fraud, and child marriage. In "E No Finish", Falz speaks against the greed of politicians and the connection it has to vices. On the closing track "After All Said And Done", he admits to his own imperfections.

== Critical reception ==
Professional ratings
Review scores
Source	Rating
Pulse Nigeria	4/5 stars
Jaguda	4/5 stars

Moral Instruction received positive reviews from music critics. Pulse Nigeria's Ehis Ohunyon called it a "compact album that holds important conversations" and said while the remaining tracks on it are good, they failed to keep the spark and edge of the project's opening three tracks Music critic Oris Aigbokhaevbolo said Moral Instruction lacks introspection, but "does a much better job of political commentary than This Is Nigeria". Aigbokhaevbolo also opined that the album might be Falz's "best chance to outlive his corporeal self". In a review for Nigerian Entertainment Today, Umar Sa'ad Hassan praised Falz's narrative skills and cognizant efforts to deliver positive messages, but ended the review saying he tries too hard to exert himself on some Fela sounds. A writer for Jaguda praised Falz for blending Afrobeat and hip hop seamlessly and said the "message on the album was delivered without ambiguity".

Moral Instruction won Best Rap Album and Album of the Year at The Headies 2019.

== Track listing ==
No.	Title	Writer(s)	Producer(s)	Length
1.	"Johnny"	Falz	TMXO	2:44
2.	"Follow Follow"	Falz	Sess	2:35
3.	"Hypocrite" (featuring Demmie Vee)	Falz; Demmie Vee	Sess	3:41
4.	"Talk"	Falz	Willis	2:31
5.	"Amen"	Falz	Sess	2:49
6.	"Brother's Keeper" (featuring Sess)	Falz; Sess	Sess	3:23
7.	"Paper" (featuring Chillz)	Falz; Chillz	Chillz	2:52
8.	"E No Finish"	Falz	Sess; Tee-Mothi; Alabama Georgia	3:04
9.	"After All Said And Done"	Falz	Tee-Mothi; Alabama Georgia	0:53
Total length:				24:36

Track notes

- "Talk" contains backing vocals by Chillz and Willis.
- "Brother's Keeper" contains backing vocals by Bamike "Bam Bam" Olawunmi, Chillz, Sess, and Deena Ade.
- "E No Finish" contains backing vocals by Sess, Seun Olufemi-White, and Simisola Giwa-Osagie
- "E No Finish" and "After All Said And Done" both contain additional instrumentation; Tee-Mothi created the horns and Alabama Georgia created the percussion.

Sample credits

- "Johnny" contains a sample of "J.J.D. (Johnny Just Drop)", as performed by Fela Kuti.
- "Follow Follow" contains a sample of "Zombie", as performed by Fela Kuti.
- "Amen" features an element of "Coffin for Head of State", as performed by Fela Kuti.
- "E No Finish" contains an interpolation of "Army Arrangement", as performed by Fela Kuti.

== Personnel ==
Credits were adapted from an instagram note posted by the rapper.

- Folarin Falana – primary artist
- Demmie Vee – featured artist
- Sess – featured artist, production (tracks 2, 3, 5, 6, 8)
- Chillz – featured artist, production (track 7)
- TMXO – production (track 1)
- Willis – production (track 4)
- Tee-Mothi – horns (tracks 8, 9)
- Alabama Georgia – percussion (tracks 8, 9)

== Release history ==
Region	Date	Format	Version	Label
Various	January 15, 2019	CD, Digital download	Standard	Bahd Guys Entertainment
