= International School Lagos =

Location
- University of Lagos, Akoka; Lagos, Lagos State; Nigeria
- 6.51113°N 3.39102°E

Information
- Other name: International School, University of Lagos (ISL)
- Type: Fee-paying, Co-educational secondary school
- Religious affiliation: None
- Established: 9 November 1981
- Founder: University of Lagos
- Status: Active
- Oversight: University of Lagos
- Principal: Kolawole O. Amusan
- Years: JSS1–SS3 (Basic 7–SS3)
- Gender: Co-educational
- Age range: 10–17
- Language: English
- Campus: UNILAG Akoka campus
- Campus type: Urban
- Colours: Green, White
- Athletics: Basketball; inter-school competitions
- Affiliation: University of Lagos (UNILAG)
- Website: https://isl.unilag.edu.ng/

The International School University of Lagos (often ISL or International School Lagos) is a fee-charging, co-educational secondary school located on the campus of University of Lagos (UNILAG) in Akoka, Lagos, Nigeria. The school was established on 9 November 1981.

== History ==
International School, University of Lagos was founded on 9 November 1981 as a day secondary school within the University of Lagos to complement the existing primary school for children of staff and the wider community. School sources state that ISL moved to its permanent site in October 1983, while a University of Lagos historical account records the relocation as October 1985.

== Campus and affiliation ==
The school is situated on UNILAG’s Akoka campus and is administered as a UNILAG affiliate unit, with access to university facilities including the UNILAG Sports Centre.

== Academics ==
ISL offers the Nigerian junior and senior secondary curricula leading to WAEC (WASSCE) and NECO examinations (JSS1–SS3).

== Admissions ==
Admission into JSS1 (Basic 7) is by entrance examination; transfers into JSS2 (Basic 8) and SS1 are conducted when vacancies exist, with schedules published by the school and UNILAG channels. In March 2021, Vanguard reported large-scale SAT screening hosted at the International School site for candidates seeking U.S. admissions.

== Student life and co-curricular activities ==
ISL takes part in Lagos “old schools” inter-school sports where traditional rivalries are rekindled; hosts and winners beyond ISL have included King's College and Queen's College.

In addition, ISL runs numerous clubs and inter-house events. In January 2024 the school held its 33rd annual inter-house athletics competition at the ISL Sports Complex, covered by PUNCH newspaper. In March 2020, the Maltina School Games team visited ISL to recognise student athletes ahead of the National Finals.

ISL alumni have pursued university studies overseas. Examples include Abiola Aderibigbe, a British-Nigerian lawyer, and Kemi Badenoch, a British politician.

=== Sports (basketball) ===
ISL has a longstanding basketball tradition. Tournament previews and reports have noted the team’s dominance in Lagos competitions and success in the MILO Secondary Schools Basketball Championship, including winning the 15th edition in 2013.

== Governance ==
ISL operates within the University of Lagos system. Kolawole O. Amusan was appointed Principal with effect from 1 September 2022.

== Past and current leadership ==
Past and current leadership
Name	Role	Tenure	Source
Rev. A. O. Adekola	Principal	1981–1986	
E. O. Fagbamiye	Administrator	1987–1988	
D. B. Ajayi	Principal	1988–1992	
O. A. Peters	Principal	1992–1996	
M. O. Ogunlesi	Interim Principal	July–Nov 1996	
Nuhu Hassan	Principal	Nov 1996–Sept 2008	
S. A. Oladipo	Acting Principal	Sept 2008–Aug 2011	
Adora E. Ojo	Principal	Sept 2011–Aug 2017	
M. B. Malik	Principal	2017–2022	
Kolawole O. Amusan	Principal	Sept 2022–present	

== Notable alumni ==
- Kemi Badenoch, British politician
