= Indodana =

Choral arrangement of Xhosa song

"Indodana" is a traditional isiXhosa song which has been arranged for choral performance by South African composers Michael Barrett and Ralf Schmitt. The lyrics, translated into English, are: "The Lord has taken his son who lived amongst us / The Son of the Lord God was crucified / Father Jehovah".

It has been recorded by the Ndlovu Youth Choir, and Choir of the Earth among others, and is the title track of a 2017 CD by the TUKS Camerata.

== The arrangers ==
Michael Barrett is director of choral activities and senior lecturer in choral conducting at the University of Pretoria, and since 2013 he has been conductor of the university's TUKS Camerata.

Ralf Schmitt conducts the Ndlovu Youth Choir, which appeared on America's Got Talent.

Both men sang with the Drakensberg Boys' Choir as children.
