= Femi Falana =

Nigerian lawyer (born 1958)

Femi Falana SAN
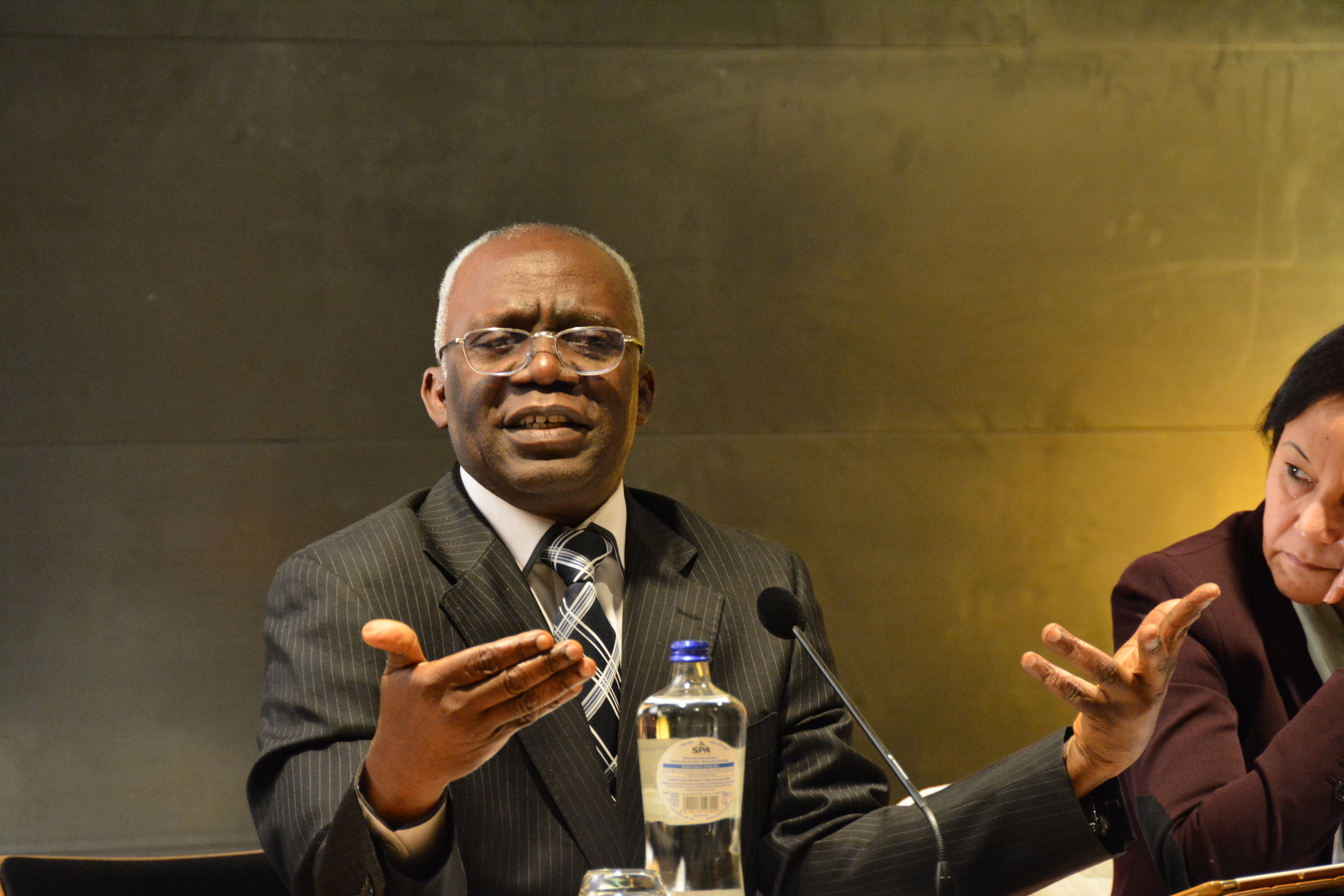
- Born: 20 May 1958 (age 68); Ilawe Ekiti, Western Region, British Nigeria (now in Ekiti State, Nigeria)
- Occupations: Lawyer; activist
- Spouse: Funmi Falana
- Children: 3, including Falz
- Website: falanafalana.com.ng

Femi Falana, SAN (born 20 May 1958), is a Nigerian lawyer and human right activist. He is the father of a Nigerian rapper Folarin Falana popularly known as Falz.

Falana is a well-known activist for human rights, always trying to show empathy to people who are oppressed. He is well known for opposing oppression, from successive military authorities.

== Early life and education ==
Femi Falana was born in Ilawe-Ekiti, Ekiti State, Nigeria. He completed his primary education at St. Michael's School and later attended Sacred Heart Catholic Seminary from 1971 to 1975. He obtained his law degree from Obafemi Awolowo University (formerly University of Ife) in 1981 and was called to the Nigerian Bar in 1982. After finishing his law practice in 2012, Femi Falana became a Senior Advocate in Nigeria.

== Legal and Activist career ==
He is a Principal Partner at Falana and Falana Chambers which he runs with his wife, Funmi Falana. He contested and lost the governorship election of Ekiti State in 2007 on the platform of the National Conscience Party, a party he served as National chairman in 2011.

He is the father of Falz, a popular Nigerian rapper, singer, online comedian and actor and husband to Nigerian women's rights activist Funmi Falana. He belongs to many professional bodies: West African Bar Association, Member, Nigerian Bar Association and Member, Fellow of the Nigerian Institute of Chartered Arbitrators (NICArb), West African Bar Association, Member, Pan African Lawyers Union and Member, International Bar Association.

== Award ==
- Femi Falana was one of the nominees for The Future Awards Africa (TFAA) of the theme "celebrating challengers and builders". He was given the award for his impact in adding values and inspiring the upcoming generation.
- Femi Falana was awarded with the Civic Activism Award by BudgIT a civic data-driven tech organization 2022.
- Femi Falana was awarded the International Bar Association's Bernard Simons Memorial Award 2008.
- Femi Falana was awarded Lifetime Achievement Award for Human and Civil Rights by LXG Awards.
- Femi Falana was awarded human rights defender award, presented by the Wole Soyinka Centre for Investigative Journalism (WSCIJ).

== Publications ==
He has written a lot of publications including Governance in Post Military. Nigeria Fundamental Rights Enforcement, Legaltext Publishing Company 2005.
