= Stories That Touch =

Studio album by Falz
- Released: 16 November 2015
- Recorded: 2015
- Genre: Afrobeat
- Length: 58:52
- Languages: Yoruba; English
- Label: Bahd Guys
- Producers: Tin Tin; Sess; Oscar Heman-Ackah; Spax

Falz chronology
Wazup Guy (2014)	Stories That Touch (2015)	27 (2017)

Singles from Stories That Touch
- 1. "Ello Bae" Released: 31 January 2015; 2. "Karishika" Released: 16 May 2015; 3. "Karishika (Part 2)" Released: 4 September 2015; 4. "Clap" Released: 11 December 2015; 5. "Soldier" Released: 14 March 2016; 6. "Soft Work" Released: 6 July 2016; 7. "Chardonnay Music" Released: 30 August 2016

Stories That Touch is the second album by Nigerian rapper and actor Falz. It was released on 16 November 2015 through Bahd Guys Entertainment. The album features guest appearances from Show Dem Camp, Yemi Alade, Phyno, Reminisce, Simi, Sess, Poe, Shaydee, Chigul, M.I., Bez, Oyinkansola, Chyn and Reekado Banks. Production was primarily handled by Sess, with additional production from Tin Tin, Oscar Heman-Ackah and Spax.

== Promotion ==
The album listening party for Stories That Touch was held at Spice Route, Victoria Island, Lagos on 18 November 2015. Poe, Reminisce, Simi, Reekado Banks, and others performed at the event. Others who attended the event include Ice Prince, Jesse Jagz, Baba Dee, and more. Spanky was the host and Dj Consequence was the disc jockey for the event.

== Singles ==
The album's lead single and only bonus track "Ello Bae" was released on 31 January 2015. The song was produced by Sess while the music video was directed by Mex and released on 4 May 2015. The second single "Karishika" features Nigerian rapper Phyno and comedian Chigul. This track was also produced by Sess and was premiered on 14 May 2015 at Industry Nite, and was officially released on 16 May 2015. The music video was directed by Aje Filmworks and released on 20 July 2015. The video won Best Afro Hip Hop Video at the 2015 Nigerian Music Video Awards. The third single is a sequel to the previous track, "Karishika". The sequel features Show Dem Camp and M.I. and was produced by Sess and engineered by Marqai.

The fourth single, "Clap" features Reminisce and was released on 11 December 2015. The song was produced by Sess and the music video was shot and directed in Lagos, Nigeria by Mex. The fifth single, "Soldier" features Simi and was released on 14 March 2016, produced by Oscar Heman-Ackah. The music video was shot and directed by Clarence Peters and features actor Deyemi Okanlawon. The song won Best Collabo at The Headies 2016. The sixth single, "Soft Work" was released on 6 July 2016. The song was produced by Sess and the video was directed by Mex. The seventh single "Chardonnay Music" features Chyn and Poe and was produced by Spax. The music video was released on 30 August 2016 and was directed by Sesan and features cameos from Simi, Ms DSF, DJ Sose, Vector, K10, Ycee, Boj, among others.

== Critical reception ==
Professional ratings
Review scores
Source	Rating
NotJustOk	8/10
Pulse Nigeria	4/5 stars
Should You Bump This	4/5 stars

Tola Sarumi of NotJustOk praised Stories That Touch for its storytelling and the tracks "Karishika" and "Soldier", and commended the "disparate producers" for "manag[ing] to make a record that sounds like an album". Sarumi concluded that Falz had made "the Hip-Hop Album of the Year" and rated the album 8 out of 10. Should You Bump This rated Stories That Touch a 4 out of 5, describing it as a "testament to the fact that Falz has grown with his music" and "a pretty good album".

Joey Akan of Pulse Nigeria called Stories That Touch as "a collection of stories that traverses all the different spheres of life" and argued that it "democratises music" by making hip-hop accessible to "the common man". He further described the album as "everything a rap album should be and more", commending Falz's "intense growth and mastery of sounds and harmony". Akan concluded that "Falz is onto a good thing" and awarded the album 4 out of 5 stars. Writing for Music in Africa, Oris Aigbokhaevbolo praised the songs "Karishika" and "Time Difference", adding that Falz's ability to appeal to both "local" and "abroad" audiences makes him "of both classes and master of none", despite being "a truly talented rapper".

=== Accolades ===
Awards and nominations for Stories That Touch
Organization	Year	Category	Result	Ref.
The Headies	2016	Best Rap Album	Nominated	
City People Entertainment Awards	2016	Album of the Year	Won	
City People Entertainment Awards	2016	Rap Album of the Year	Nominated	
Ghana-Naija Showbiz Awards	2017	Album of the Year	Nominated	

== Track listing ==
Stories That Touch track listing
No.	Title	Writer(s)	Producer(s)	Length
1.	"Kabiyesi" (featuring Oyinkansola)	Folarin Falana; Oyinkansola	Tin Tin	3:42
2.	"Soft Work"	Falana	Sess	3:25
3.	"My People"	Falana	Sess	4:22
4.	"Karishika" (featuring Phyno and Chigul)	Falana; Chibuzor Azubuike	Sess	4:13
5.	"Soldier" (featuring Simi)	Falana; Simisola Ogunleye	Oscar Heman-Ackah	3:24
6.	"Workaholic"	Falana	Sess	3:16
7.	"Soupé" (featuring Yemi Alade and Shaydee)	Falana; Yemi Alade; Shadrach Adeboye	Spax	3:46
8.	"Clap" (featuring Reminisce)	Falana; Remilekun Safaru	Sess	3:16
9.	"Time Difference" (featuring Sess)	Falana; Salami Abbas	Sess	3:41
10.	"Mid-Flight Announcement" (skit)	Falana	—	1:21
11.	"Celebrity Girlfriend" (featuring Reekado Banks)	Falana; Ayoleyi Solomon	Sess	3:05
12.	"Chardonnay Music" (featuring Poe and Chyn)	Falana; Ladipo Eso; Cheyenne Labesa	Spax	4:36
13.	"Kawosoke"	Falana	Sess	3:08
14.	"Love You Pass" (featuring Bez)	Falana; Emmanuel Idakula	Spax	3:05
15.	"Karishika" (part 2; featuring M.I and Show Dem Camp)	Falana; Jude Abaga; Wale Davies; Olumide Ayeni	Sess	4:03
16.	"Everybody (Thank You)"	Falana	Sess	2:47
Total length:				58:52

Bonus tracks
No.	Title	Writer(s)	Producer(s)	Length
17.	"Ello Bae"	Falana	Sess	3:36

Notes

- "—" denotes a skit

== Personnel ==
- Folarin "Falz" Falana – vocals, executive producer
- Oyinkansola – vocals, backing vocals
- Jude "M.I" Abaga – vocals
- Emmanuel "Bez" Idakula – vocals
- Chibuzor "Phyno" Azubuike – vocals
- Ayoleyi "Reekado Banks" Solomon – vocals
- Shadrach "Shaydee" Adeboye – vocals
- Ladipo "Poe" Eso – vocals
- Chioma "Chigul" Omeruah – vocals
- Cheyenne "Chyn" Labesa – vocals
- Remilekun "Reminisce" Safaru – vocals
- Yemi Eberechi Alade – vocals
- Wale "Tec" Davies and Olumide "Ghost" Ayeni" – vocals
- Simisola "Simi" Ogunleye – vocals, mixing engineer
- Salami "Sess" Abass – vocals, producer
- Augustine "Tin Tin" Imevbore – producer, mixing engineer, mastering engineer
- Oscar Heman-Ackah – producer
- Akano "Spax" Samuel – producer
- Michael "Marqai" Udenna – mixing engineer
- Olujerry – mixing engineer
- Timsax – saxophone
- Oluwaseun "Saeon" Oni – backing vocals
- Lily Oge – backing vocals
- Nosa Omoregbe – backing vocals
- August Udoh – photography, album art
- Sidney "Aboki" Sule – executive producer
- Femisoro Ajayi – executive producer

== Release history ==
Release history and formats for Stories That Touch
Region	Date	Format	Label
Nigeria	16 November 2015	CD; digital download	Bahd Guys Entertainment
