= Temi Balogun =

Nigerian media personality

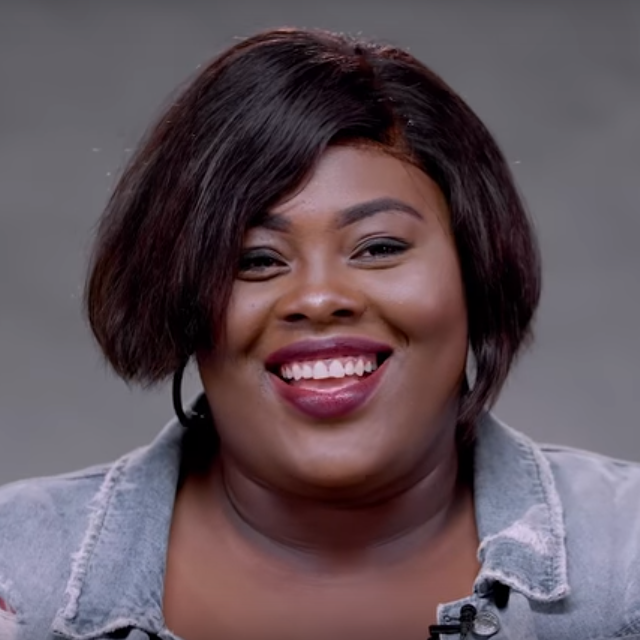
- TaymiB on "TGIF" on NdaniTV in 2018
- Born: Temilola Balogun c.1991
- Other names: TaymiB and Temi Balogun Akinmuda
- Education: Nottingham University
- Occupation: On Air Personality
- Employer: Cool FM Nigeria

Temilola Balogun also known as TaymiB and Temi Balogun Akinmuda is a Nigerian media personality and creator of the television series Skinny Girl in Transit.

== Education and career ==
She was educated at Queen's College in Lagos and later studied media at Nottingham Trent University. She was once a T-shirt designer who sang in a duo called "Soyinka's Afro" with her brother Ajebutter 22 in 2009.

Balogun became a host at Cool FM Nigeria, a Lagos-based pop and rock station. She is the creator of the television series Skinny Girl in Transit which reached its sixth series in 2020 and its seventh in 2023. She leads BOX TV which produced the series Things Men Say, launched in 2017.

In 2019, Balogun and N6 hosted a live interview with American rapper Cardi B, who was on her first tour of Africa, performing in Nigeria and Ghana.

== Personal life ==
She is married to Timi Akinmuda and they have two children.
