= Falz =

Nigerian rapper (born 1990)

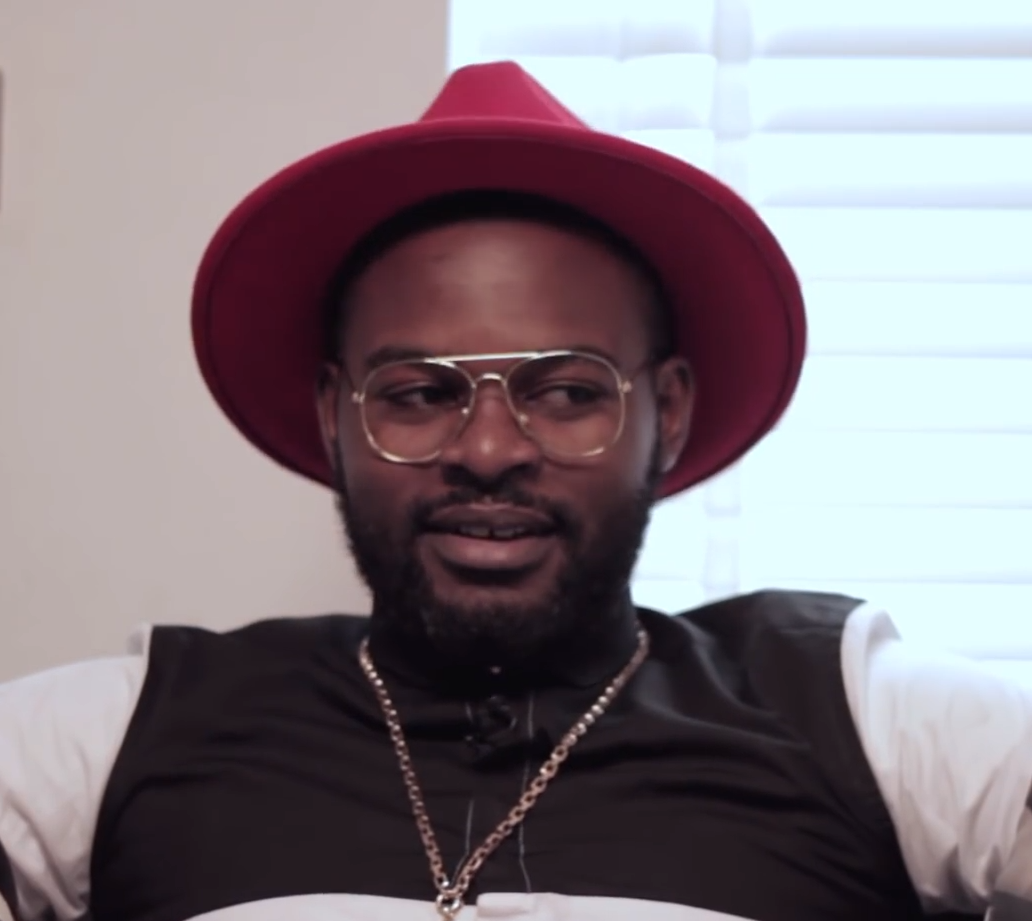
- Falz on NdaniTV

Background information
- Also known as: Falz the Bahd Guy
- Born: Folarin Falana; 27 October 1990 (age 35); Lagos State, Nigeria
- Origin: Lagos
- Genres: Afropop; hip hop
- Occupations: Rapper; songwriter; actor
- Instrument: Vocals
- Years active: 2009–present
- Label: Bahd Guys Records

Folarin Falana (born 27 October 1990), better known by his stage name Falz, is a Nigerian rapper, songwriter, and actor. He began his career in secondary school after forming a group called "The School Boys" with a friend, before launching his professional music career in 2009. Falz gained wider recognition after releasing the song "Marry Me" featuring vocals from Poe and Yemi Alade.

He currently owns an independent record label called "Bahd Guys Records". He released his debut album Wazup Guy in 2014. His second album Stories That Touch was released in 2015. He released 27 in 2017, and his fourth studio album Moral Instruction in 2019.

== Early life and education ==
Falz was born in the local government area of Mushin, Lagos State, to lawyers and human right activists Funmi and Femi Falana. He was called to the bar in 2012 after graduating from the Nigerian Law School in Abuja. Falz completed his basic and secondary school education at St. Leo's Catholic Primary School, Ikeja and Olashore International School, Osun State respectively. He is an alumnus of the University of Reading England, having graduated with an LLB honors degree in Law.

== Career ==
=== 2009–2013: Beginnings and Shakara: The Mixtape ===
Falz started music as a hobby while in secondary school. He formed a music group with a friend called "The School Boys". In 2009, he released a compilation of some of his recordings as a mixtape titled Shakara: The Mixtape.

In 2011, Falz released a single titled "Wahz Up Guy", then released "High Class" and "Currency", which gained him grounds in the Nigerian music industry.

=== 2014–2016: Wazzup Guy, Stories That Touch and Chemistry EP ===
On 2 January 2014, Falz was listed in tooXclusive's "Artistes To Watch in 2014". On 30 May 2014, Falz released his debut studio album titled Wazup Guy, the album featured productions from the likes of Studio Magic, DJ Woske, Tin Tin and Spellz, among others. Wazzup Guy houses 18 tracks with guest appearances from Olamide, Show Dem Camp, Phenom, and Yemi Alade. Some of the tracks are: "See Me", "Toyin Tomato", "Senator", "Right Now", "Jessica", "High Class", "Marry Me", "Oh God", "The Advice" and "Cool Parry", which was critically acclaimed by music critics.

On 31 January 2015, Falz returned with an official single titled "Ello Bae". Actually, it was his first solo effort after the release, of Wazzup Guy and it won him several awards.

In 2015, Falz was nominated in the "Best Collaboration of The Year" category at the 2015 Nigeria Entertainment Awards for his chart-topping single "Marry Me". It won him a nomination in the "Best Collaboration of The Year" category at the 2015 Nigeria Entertainment Awards. He was also nominated in the "Best Rap Act of The Year" and "Best New Act to Watch" categories.

On 31 January 2015, he released a single titled "Ello Bae", which made him a nominee in the "Best Street Hop Artiste of The Year" category at 2015 The Headies award.

On 3 November 2015, he announced the release of his second studio album, titled Stories That Touch, which was released on 17 November.

In 2016, Falz won "Best Actor in a Comedy Movie/Series" at the 2016 Africa Magic Viewers Choice Awards for his role as Segun in Funke Akindele's TV series Jenifa's Diary. In June 2016, Falz was voted the winner of the "Viewer's Choice Best New International Act" category at the 2016 BET Awards.

On 27 October 2016, Falz collaborated with Simi to release Chemistry, a seven-track EP solely produced by Sess. Falz had previously worked with Simi on the singles "Jamb Question" and "Soldier".

=== 2017 – present: 27 and acting career ===
On 27 October 2017, his 27th birthday, Falz released a new album titled 27 to celebrate the day. This was a surprise album, as it was not promoted before its release. It contained 17 tracks including hit singles like "Bhad Baddo Baddest", "Wehdone sir", and "Something light". It featured prominent music acts like Davido, Olamide, Burna Boy, Wande Coal, Maleek Berry, Sir Dauda, Medikal, Terry Apala, and Ycee. The album was majorly produced by Sess as an in-house producer, with some tracks done by Maleek Berry, and studio magic. The album performed well and earned several awards and nominations, including a nomination for The Headies Award for Rap Album of the Year.

In May 2018, Falz released a music video titled "This Is Nigeria" which was inspired by Childish Gambino's "This is America". It highlighted Nigerian issues including corruption and bribery.

Months later, the song was banned by the NBC (National Broadcasting Commission) claiming it was a vulgar song. When Falz was asked, he said: "If they ban this song, then I do not understand them because that song is definitely not a vulgar song,". However, Falz sues NBC for N100 Million.

On 1 September 2018, Falz won "Best Supporting Actor" at the 2018 Africa Magic Viewers' Choice Awards for his role as Quam in Tope Oshin Ogun's movie New Money, becoming the first Nigerian musician to have won the Africa Magic Viewers' Choice Awards twice.

In August 2020, Falz unveiled his film production company with the name House21TV. While unveiling the new film production company Falz also took to Instagram to unveil an all new comedy series, Therapy Session, to air exclusively on YouTube.

In March 2022, Falz announced on his Instagram that he had deleted his previous posts and released his first single of the year, "Ice Cream", featuring BNXN (also known as Buju). He also promoted the single using a branded van with a ticketing booth, distributing free ice cream in parts of Lagos.

In March 2023, Falz collaborated with rapper Vector to release the single Yakubu, a politically charged track criticizing the 2023 Nigerian general elections. The song was named after the chairman of the Independent National Electoral Commission (INEC), Mahmood Yakubu, and highlighted various electoral controversies. It gained widespread attention for its bold political message.

In May 2023, Falz underwent surgery in London to repair a torn ACL sustained during a football match in late 2022. He documented his surgery and recovery process on social media, sharing the challenges of rehabilitation and his progress as he returned to full health through physiotherapy.

== Artistry ==
Falz describes his style of music as "Wahzup music". It is the fusion of comic lyrics with contemporary hip-hop in a faux Yoruba accent.

On 18 November 2014, Falz was ranked #9 on notJustOk's list of "The 10 Most Gifted Rappers In Nigeria 2014", stating that, "Falz’s ability to maintain a thought and get his point across in 16 barz while switching accents, infusing funny punchlines and delivering all of it in a way that makes the listener follow along is nothing short of impressive".

== EndSARS protest ==
In October 2020, Falz called on Runtown and other Nigerian celebrities to join the #EndSARS protests in Lagos, Southwest Nigeria, calling on the government to end police brutality. The singer is vocal about issues bordering on social justice across the country. Paying tribute to the victims of police brutality, he released a music video for "Johnny", the first single off his last album, Moral Instruction. He wrote in a post introducing the song, "We will never forget the heroes that have been unlawfully slain. This is for them. For every single Nigerian life snatched away unlawfully, we must make sure we get justice." "Almost two years since I released the audio. Even more disturbing to think that as time passed, the message became more relevant."

In an interview with CNN's Christiane Amanpour, in 2020, Falz said President Buhari's promise to reform the Nigerian police was infuriating and frustrating as he claimed Buhari has been making same promise since 2017.

== Activism ==
Known for his activism through music, Falz continues to release tracks addressing social and political issues in Nigeria. During the 2023 elections, he called for increased participation and youth involvement in Nigerian politics, as well as other issues like voter apathy and electoral malpractice. His 2023 single "Yakubu", following previous hits like "This is Nigeria", further solidified his position as a socially conscious artist, using music to critique corruption and injustices in the country.

== Discography ==
Studio albums

- Wazup Guy (2014)
- Stories That Touch (2015)
- 27 (2017)
- Moral Instruction (2019)
- BAHD (2022)
- The Feast (2025)

EPs

- Chemistry (with Simi) (2016)
- Before the Feast (2024)
- Break Time (2026)

== Filmography ==
Name
Year	Film/ Television	Role	Notes
2015	Jenifa's Diary	Sege	TV series
2016	Couple of Days	Gateman	Movie
2016	Tinsel	Kayode Beko-Williams	Soap opera
2017	10 Days in Sun City	Seyi	Movie
2018	New Money	Quam	Movie
2018	Merry Men: The Real Yoruba Demons	Remi Martin	Movie
2018	Chief Daddy	Femi 'Famzy' Beecroft	Movie
2019	Merry Men 2	Remi Martin	Movie
2019	Muna	Police Officer	Movie (cameo)
2019	Your Excellency	AK Famzy	Movie (camoe)
2021	Quam's Money	Quam Omole	Movie
2021	Chief Daddy 2: Going for Broke	Femi 'Famzy' Beecroft	Movie
2022	Brotherhood	Wale Adetula	Movie
2022	Knee Down	Femi	Short drama
2023	Donkey Curse		Comedy / Fantasy
2024	Everybody Loves Jenifa	Sege	Comedy / Drama

== Awards and nominations ==
Year	Event	Prize	Recipient	Result	Ref.
2014	Scream Awards	Best New Act of the Year	Himself	Nominated	
2015	2015 Nigeria Entertainment Awards	Best Rap Act of the Year	Himself	Nominated	
2015	2015 Nigeria Entertainment Awards	Best New Act to Watch	Himself	Nominated	
2015	2015 Nigeria Entertainment Awards	Best Collaboration of the Year	Falz for "Marry Me"	Nominated	
2015	The Headies	Best Street Hop Artiste of the Year	Falz for "Ello Bae"	Nominated	
2016	2016 Africa Magic Viewers Choice Awards	Best Actor in a Comedy Movie/Series	Jenifa's Diary	Won	
2016	2016 BET Awards	Viewer's Choice Best New International Act	Himself	Won	
2016	2016 City People Entertainment Awards	Album of the Year	Stories That Touch	Won	
2016	9th Nigeria Music Video Awards	Best Afro Hip Hop Video	"Karashika"	Won	
2016	2016 Nigeria Entertainment Awards	Best Music Video	"Karashika"	Nominated	
2016	2016 Nigeria Entertainment Awards	Album of the Year	Stories That Touch	Nominated	
2016	WatsUp TV Africa Music Video Awards	Best African Newcomer Video	"Bahd Baddo Baddest"	Nominated	
2016	WatsUp TV Africa Music Video Awards	Best African Hip Hop Video	"Bahd Baddo Baddest"	Nominated	
2016	The Headies	Artiste of the Year	Himself	Nominated	
2016	The Headies	Album of the Year	"Stories That Touch"	Nominated	
2016	The Headies	Best Rap Album	"Stories That Touch"	Nominated	
2016	The Headies	Best Collabo	"Soldier"	Won	
2016	The Headies	Best Street Hop Artiste of the Year	Ajebutter22 featuring Falz for "Bad Gang"	Nominated	
2017	City People Music Award	Alternative Artist of the Year	Himself	Nominated	
2017	Nigeria Entertainment Award	Best Album of the Year	Chemistry	Nominated	
2017	Nigeria Entertainment Award	Best Rap Act of the Year	Himself	Nominated	
2018	The Headies	Best Rap Single	"Something Light"	Nominated	
2018	The Headies	Best Rap Album	27	Nominated	
2018	The Headies	Best Performer	Himself	Nominated	
2018	Africa Magic Viewers Choice Awards	Best Supporting Actor	New Money	Won	
2019	The Headies	Best Rap Single	"Talk"	Won	
2019	The Headies	Best Rap Album	Moral Instruction	Won	
2019	The Headies	Album of the Year	Moral Instruction	Won	
2020	The Headies	Best Rap Single	"Bop Daddy" featuring Ms Banks	Won	
2021	Net Honours	Most Popular Musician	Himself	Nominated	
