= Ifunanya Nwangene =

Nigerian singer (1999–2026)

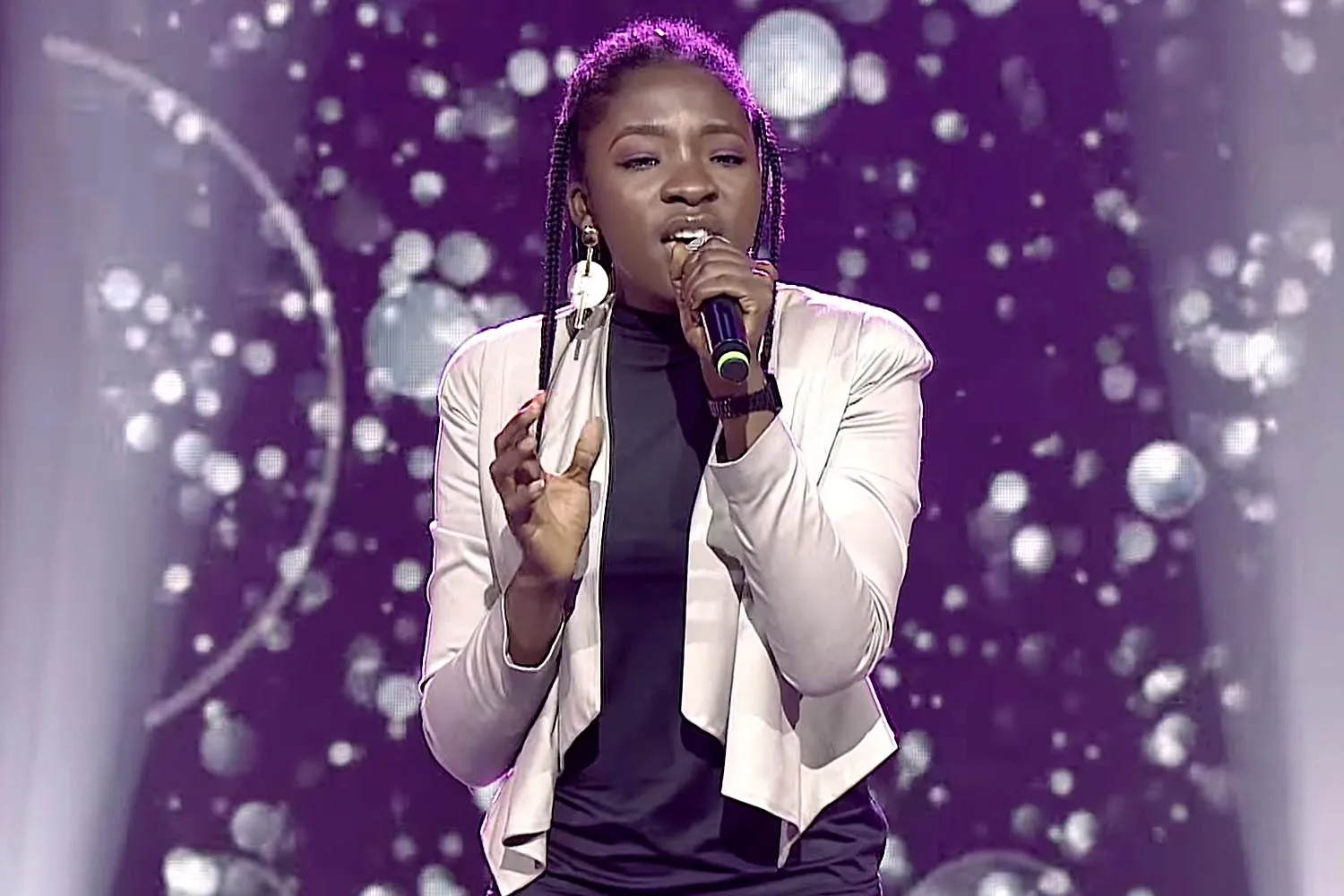
- Ifunanya performing at the blinds on The Voice Nigeria Season 3
- Born: Ifunanya Lucy Nwangene; 27 October 1999; Lagos, Nigeria
- Died: 31 January 2026 (aged 26); Abuja, Nigeria
- Education: University of Nigeria
- Occupations: Architect, singer, composer, stage actress
- Years active: 2017–2026

Ifunanya Lucy Nwangene (27 October 1999 – 31 January 2026) was a Nigerian singer and architect, also known by her stage name Nanyah. She gained national recognition as a contestant on Season 3 of The Voice Nigeria and was known for her soulful performances and work as a choral and contemporary singer based in Abuja, Nigeria.

She died in January 2026 after complications from a snake bite, an incident that drew widespread public attention and tributes within Nigeria's creative community.

== Early life and background ==
Nwangene was born and raised in Lagos, Nigeria, to Christopher and Patricia Nwangene, who hail from Nara Unateze in Enugu State. She attended Cridy Children Nursery and Primary School, Abule Osun, Lagos, and later King's High School, Lagos, for her secondary education. She proceeded to the University of Nigeria, Nsukka, where she studied architecture.

== Career ==
=== The Voice Nigeria ===
After completing her formal education in Nigeria, Nwangene later settled in Abuja, where she combined academic and professional pursuits with the continued development of her music career. During this period, she became actively involved in choral music and live performances, experiences that laid the foundation for her later public recognition as a vocalist.

Nwangene rose to national attention in 2021 as a contestant on Season 3 of The Voice Nigeria. Her blind audition performance attracted positive reactions from viewers and judges, marking her as one of the notable vocalists of the season.

=== Music and performances ===
Outside of television, Nwangene was active as a performing singer. She shared vocal covers and original material on social media platforms and performed at live events. Her musical repertoire included jazz, opera, classical music, and soul, and she also performed as an actor in musical theatre productions in Abuja.

She was also a member of the Abuja Metropolitan Music Society Choir (AMEMUSO) in Abuja, where she sang as a soprano. At the time of her death, she was reportedly preparing for further independent releases and her first major solo concert.

== Death ==
On 31 January 2026, Nwangene died at the age of 26 after being bitten by a snake while asleep in her home in Abuja. Reports indicate that she initially sought treatment at a medical facility that did not have antivenom available and was later transferred to the Federal Medical Centre, Abuja.

Despite medical intervention, she died from complications related to the bite. Her death prompted widespread reactions from fans, fellow musicians, members of the Nigerian entertainment industry, the general public, and the international community. Following the incident, reports stated that two snakes were later discovered in her residence, one of which was identified as a cobra.

Medical personnel involved in her treatment denied allegations of negligence, stating that appropriate procedures were followed based on the resources available at the time. The chief medical director of the Federal Medical Centre, Abuja, later appeared before the Nigerian Senate Committee on Health to explain the circumstances surrounding her death and denied negligence in her treatment.

The Abuja Metropolitan Music Society Choir, her friends, and the music community in Abuja held a tribute concert in her honour at the Congress Hall of Transcorp Hilton, Abuja. She was laid to rest on February 14, 2026, in her hometown of Nara-Unateze, Enugu State.
