= Idyl (musician) =

Nigerian singer, songwriter and recording artist

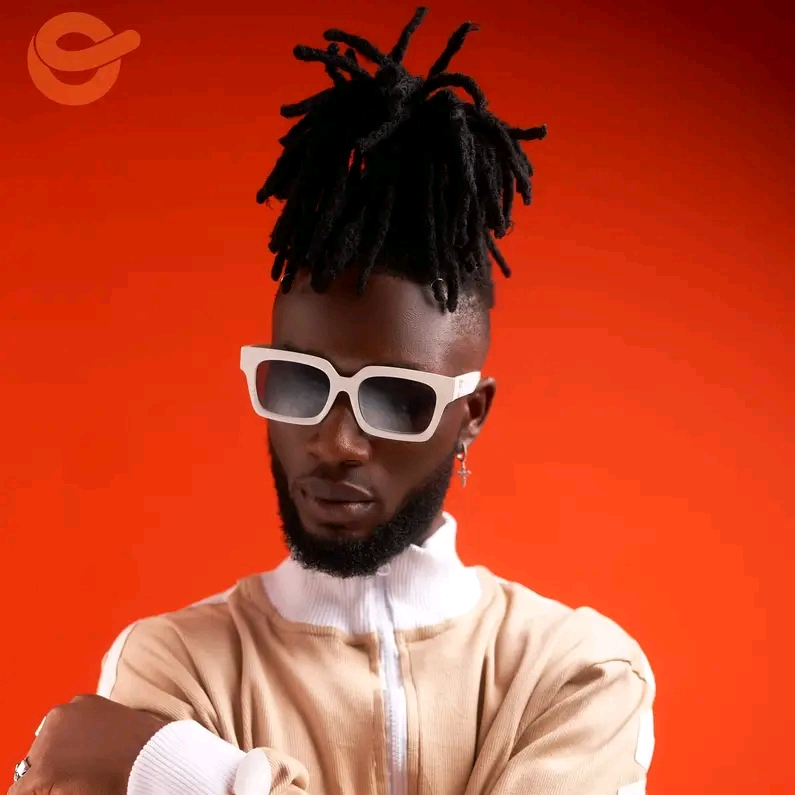
- Idyl in 2021

Background information
- Born: Daniel Diongoli; April 28, 1995 (age 30); Bayelsa State
- Genres: Afropop, R&B, soul
- Occupations: Singer, songwriter
- Years active: 2012–present
- Label: Universal Music Africa

Daniel Diongoli (born 28 April 1995) known professionally as Idyl, is a Nigerian singer, songwriter and recording artist. He won the Season 2 of The Voice Nigeria and is signed to Universal Music Group Nigeria. He is from Bayelsa state in southern Nigeria.

== Career ==
In 2016, he released the song “Tari”, for which he won the "Next Rated Artiste Award" at the "Bayelsa Media Awards". In the same year, he also won an award from the "Roger Hammond Memorial Trust Fund" in London, which came with a music scholarship at the "Musical Society of Nigeria (MUSON) School of Music", where he learned to play the piano and studied music theory and vocal training.

In 2017, Idyl auditioned for season two of The Voice Nigeria and was selected by singer Timi Dakolo into his team for the competition. In September 2017, after a 3-month long competition, he was announced as the winner of the reality TV series, ahead of 48 other contestants who qualified for the finals. This was the first ever win for Team Timi Dakolo on the show.

As a result of his win, Idyl received a recording contract with Universal Music Africa, a sports utility vehicle and an all-expense-paid trip to Dubai in the United Arab Emirates.

== 2017–present ==
After his win at The Voice Nigeria, Idyl performed at the GAC showcase in Guangzhou, China and he released his debut single on the Universal Music imprint, Better Love. In July 2018, he released Owami, featuring South African singer Lungi Naidoo and produced by Ckay, which enjoyed critical success. Idly featured another South African artiste, Rowlene Bosman in March 2019 on the song, Satisfy Me, which was described as an edgier sound compared to his earlier releases. Satisfy Me received favourable responses from audiences and months later, he released an ADM remix. In August 2019, he released another single, Iyoro produced by Sovida, which was recorded in his local Ijaw language. The song title translates to ‘Beautiful woman’ in English.

== Discography ==
- Better Love (2018)
- Owami (2018)
- Satisfy Me (2019)
- Satisfy Me – Remix (2019)
- Iyoro (2019)

== Awards and achievements ==
=== Music Competition ===
Awards and achievements
Preceded by A'rese	The Voice Nigeria; Winner; 2017	Succeeded by Esther Benyeogo
