= Tunde Ednut =

Nigerian blogger (born 1982)

- Born: Tunde Olaoluwa Adekunle; 20 January 1982 (age 44); Katsina, Nigeria
- Education: University of Lagos; University of London
- Occupations: Blogger; musician
- Years active: 2007–present

Tunde Olaoluwa Adekunle (born 20 January 1982), popularly known as Tunde Ednut, is a Nigerian blogger, influencer, entertainer and musician noted for his blog and songs "Jingle Bell" and "Catching Cold", which was a Headies award nominee for best pop single at The Headies Awards of 2013. He is widely regarded as one of the most prominent bloggers in Nigeria.

In 2021, Ednut was named the Most ‘Searched Media Personality’ at the Net Honours Class of 2021. In that same year, he was listed by Ynaija as one of the most powerful young Nigerians.

== Early life and education ==
Originally from Kogi State, Tunde Ednut was born in Katsina State, Northern Nigeria, to Nigerian Christian lecturers, where he grew up before his family eventually relocated to Lagos State. He studied Graphic arts at the University of Lagos. Afterwards, he moved to the UK to obtain a degree in Graphic design from Kingsland University of London in England.

== Career ==
=== 2007–2008: Beginnings ===
Ednut first started out as a comedian in 2007, where he was a guest performer at the Dyanmix Awards in Nigeria, and caught the attention of medias. In 2008, he was nominated for The Future Awards Africa. Same year, Ednut began performing across Nigeria, and subsequently performed in the United Kingdom where he is most noted for his comic works, Ednut was honored with The Award for the Best Nigerian Comedian in the UK before he moved back to Nigeria to pursue a career in music.

=== 2011–present ===
Ednut started his musical career in 2011 with his debut single "My Kind Song". In 2012, he released "Catching Cold" with a remix featuring Dr SID. In 2014, he released 3 songs which includes "Baby Boo", "Buga Won" and "Kosowo". In 2016, he would go on and release "Jingle Bell" which had multiple remixes with fellow Nigerian stars, Mi Abaga, Davido, Tiwa Savage and Seun Kuti. his musical credits include collaborations with Falz, Ice Prince, Orezi and more.

=== Political commentary ===
In October 2026, Ednut publicly urged Nigerians ahead of the 2027 general election to legally oppose a second term for President Bola Tinubu, citing growing frustration over the nation's governance and direction.

== Controversy ==
On 22 December 2020, Ednut's verified Instagram account with over 2.6 million followers was deactivated. According to the Peoples Gazette, he violated the app's community guidelines which led to the removal of his account from the platform.

On 10 January 2021, Ednut created a new Instagram account, with the username Kingtundeednut. And as at the early hours of Wednesday 13 January, he had already garnered 1 million followers, that became a trending topic on Twitter. Same day, Ednut did a 1 million Nigerian naira giveaway to his fans in celebration of his comeback to the platform. Three days after he accomplished 1 million followers, the account was however deactivated again due to several reports from unknown persons. Same month, Instagram reinstated Ednut's account after fellow Nigerian stars rallied support asking that the account should be restored. In 2023, Ednut's Instagram was disabled by Meta with 7.5M fans. He, however created another page which has earned up to 2.2M fans.

== Legacy ==
Aside from music and blogging, Ednut helps or supports upcoming comedians and musicians by posting their videos and skits on his Instagram page. He has been credited for supporting or helping in popularizing comedians and artists such as VeryDarkMan, Mr Funny, Ugoccie, Aloma Isaac Junior, Ola of Lagos, Sydney Talker, and Kiriku.
