= The Voice Nigeria season 1 =

Season of Nigeria music series

The Voice Nigeria
- Season 1
- Coaches: 2face Idibia; Waje; Patoranking; Timi Dakolo
- Winner: A'rese
- Winning coach: Waje
- Runner-up: Chike

Release
- Original release: 10 April – 31 July 2016

Season chronology
- Next → Season 2

The Voice Nigeria Season 1 is the first season of the Nigerian version of the TV series The Voice. It was broadcast on Africa Magic from 10 April 2016 to 31 July 2016 and was sponsored by Airtel and Coca-Cola.The winner earned a recording contract with Universal Music Group, an SUV car worth N7 million and a trip to Abu Dhabi.

== Coaches and Hosts ==
Coaches

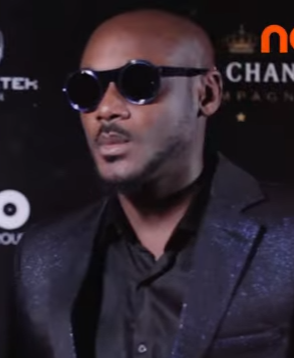
2Baba

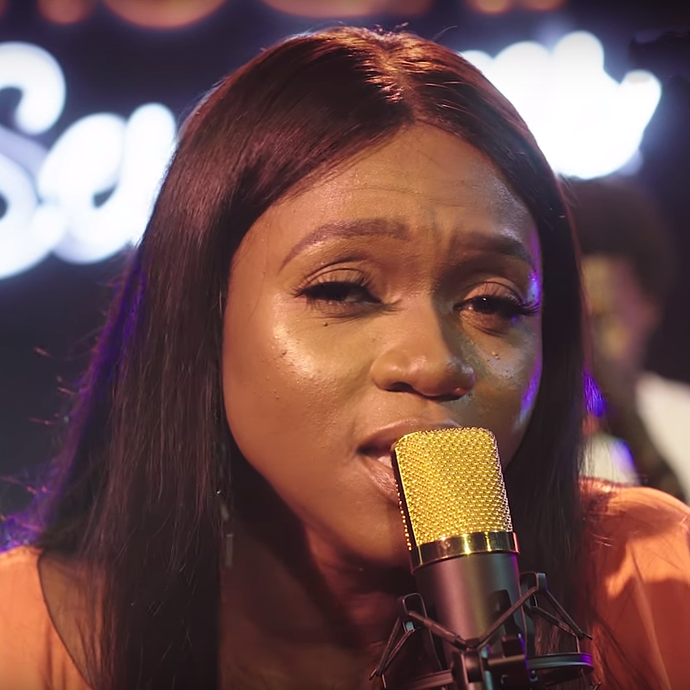
Waje

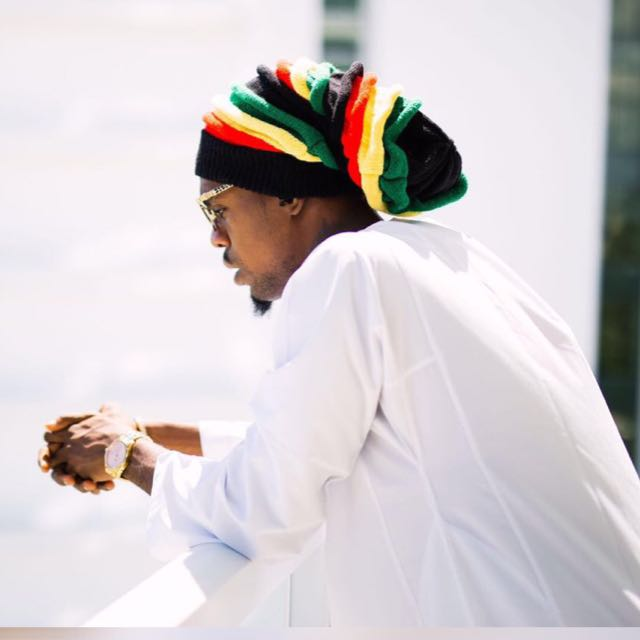
Patoranking
Hosts

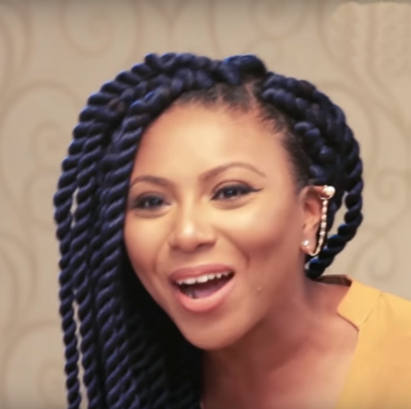
Stephanie Coker

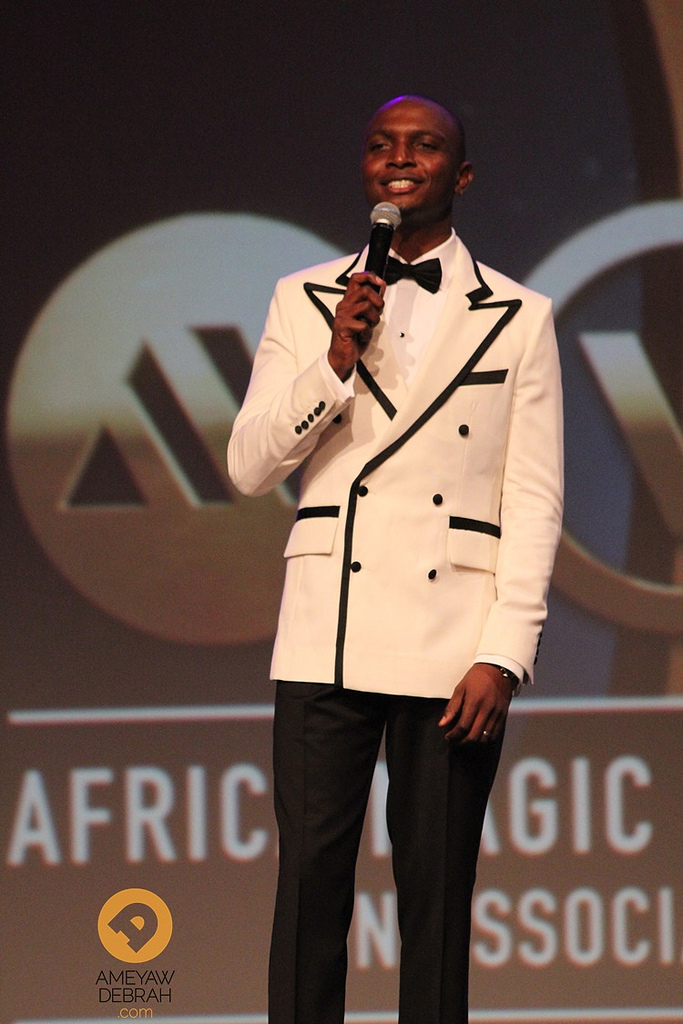
IK Osakioduwa

== Teams ==
Color key

- Winner
- Runner-up
- Third place
- Fourth place
- Eliminated in the live shows
- Stolen in the Battle rounds
- Eliminated in the battle rounds

Coaches	Top 48 Artists				
Timi Dakolo					
Timi Dakolo	Cornel	Dewe	Vicky	Armstrong Martins	Kofo
Timi Dakolo	Tobore	Joeblue	Grace	~~Viveeyan~~	Happiness Itua
Timi Dakolo	Obass	Patrick Akiba	Daivy Jones	Ojay	
Waje					
Waje	A'rese	Patrick	Promise	Michael	Shammah
Waje	Khemmie	Dawn	Chiche	~~Dewe~~	~~Emem~~
Waje	~~Uche~~	Joxy Jeb	Mojisola	Flourish	
2Baba					
2Baba	Brenda	Viveeyan	David Operah	Jennifer	Theodora
2Baba	Precious	Emem	Gabriel songs	~~DNA~~	~~Tobore~~
2Baba	~~Chiche~~	Obed	David	Oni Roxy	
Patoranking					
Patoranking	Chike	Nonso Bassey	DNA	Linda 1nneka	Sylvia Charles
Patoranking	Prime	Benjamin	Uche	~~Patrick~~	Ikechukwu
Patoranking	Ralph	Shimar	Elizabeth	Osuwake	

== Battles ==
Color key

Artist won the Battle and advances
Artist lost the Battle but was stolen by another coach and advances
Artist lost the Battle and was eliminated

Coach	Order	Winner	Song	Loser	'Steal' result			
Coach	Order	Winner	Song	Loser	2Baba	Waje	Pato	Timi
Waje	1	A'rese	"Stronger (What Doesn't Kill You)"	Flourish	—	—	—	—
Waje	2	Promise	"Only Me"	Mojisola	—	—	—	—
Waje	3	Khemmie	"Set Fire To The Rain"	Joxy jeb	—	—	—	—
Waje	4	Shammah	" Fallin'"	Emem	✔	—	—	—
Waje	5	Dawn	"FourFiveSeconds"	Uche	—	—	✔	—
Waje	6	Michael	"Against All Odds (Take A Look At Me Now)"	Dewe	—	—	—	✔
Timi Dakolo	1	Armstrong Martins	"Counting Stars"	Viveeyan	✔	—	—	—
Timi Dakolo	2	Cornel	"Wish Me Well"	Obass	—	—	—	—
Timi Dakolo	3	Kofo	"Irawo"	Happiness	—	—	—	—
Timi Dakolo	4	Vicky	"Unfaithful"	Patrick Akiba	—	—	—	—
Timi Dakolo	5	Joeblue	"Oliver Twist"	Daivy Jones	—	—	—	—
Timi Dakolo	6	Grace	"Redemption Song"	Ojay	—	—	—	—
Patoranking	1	Prime	"Rude"	Ralph	—	—	—	—
Patoranking	2	Chike	"Let Me Love You"	Patrick	—	✔	—	—
Patoranking	3	Nonso Bassey	"Treasure"	Shimar	—	—	—	—
Patoranking	4	Sylvia Charles	"Lady Marmalade"	Elizabeth	—	—	—	—
Patoranking	5	Linda 1nneka	"Laye"	Ikechukwu	—	—	—	—
Patoranking	6	Benjamin	"Left For Good"	Osuwake	—	—	—	—
2Baba	1	Brenda	"Try Sleeping With A Broken Heart"	David	—	—	—	—
2Baba	2	Precious	"Kedike"	Chiche	—	✔	—	—
2Baba	3	David Operah	"Stay With Me"	Obed	—	—	—	—
2Baba	4	Theodora	"Rolling In The Deep"	Oni Roxy	—	—	—	—
2Baba	5	Gabriel songs	"As Long As You Love Me"	DNA	—	—	✔	—
2Baba		Jennifer	"Awwww"	Tobore	—	—	—	✔

== See also ==
- The Voice Nigeria
- The Voice Nigeria (Season 2)
