= The Voice Nigeria season 2 =

Season of musical television series

The Voice Nigeria
- Season 2
- Coaches: Yemi Alade; Waje; Patoranking; Timi Dakolo
- Winner: Idyl
- Winning coach: Timi Dakolo
- Runner-up: Ebube

Release
- Original release: 18 June 2017

Season chronology
- ← Previous; Season 1

The Voice Nigeria Season 2 is the second season of the Nigerian version of the TV series The Voice. It was broadcast on Africa Magic from 18 June 2017 and was sponsored by Airtel and Coca-Cola. The winner earned a recording contract with Universal Music Group, an SUV car worth N7 million and a trip to Abu Dhabi.

Idyl was the winner of this season, marking Dakolo's first win. This was the first time of having a male winner and also the first of having a male winning coach.

== Coaches and hosts ==
2Baba didn't return as a coach. Yemi Alade replaced him marking her first season as a coach. Waje, Timi Dakolo and Patoranking all returned for their second season on the show. Stephanie Coker and IK Osakioduwa both returned for their second season as hosts.

Coaches

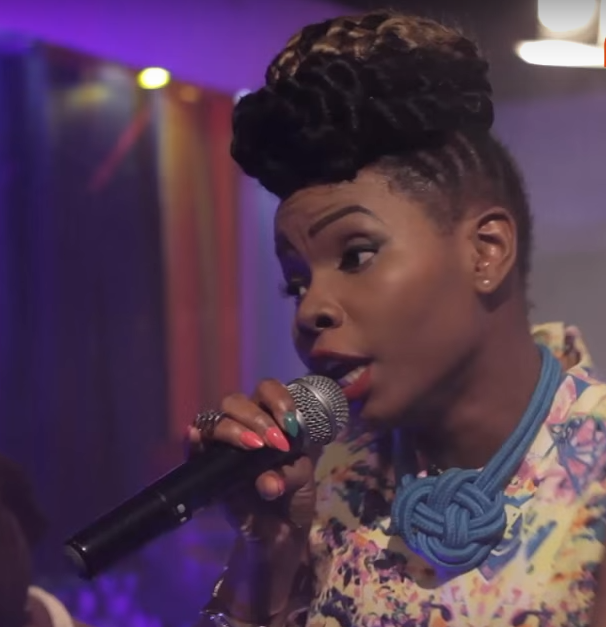
Yemi Alade

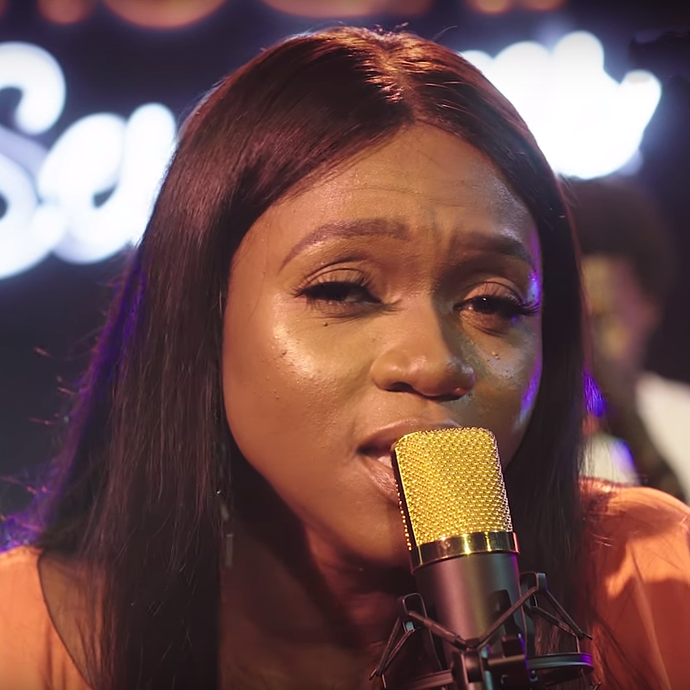
Waje

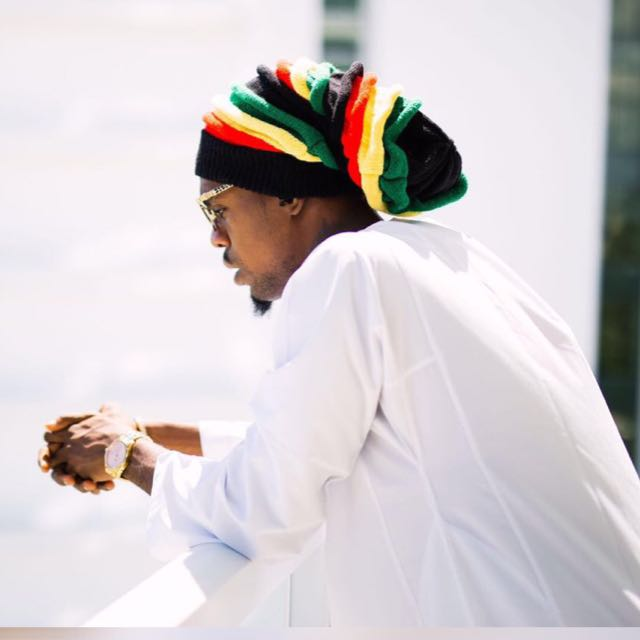
Patoranking
Hosts

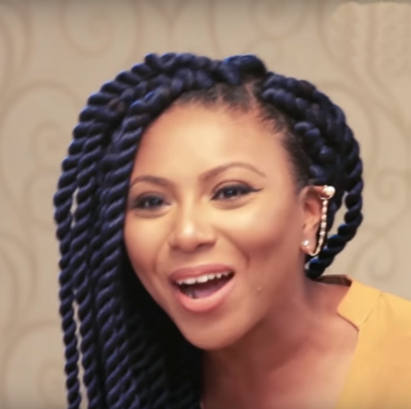
Stephanie Coker

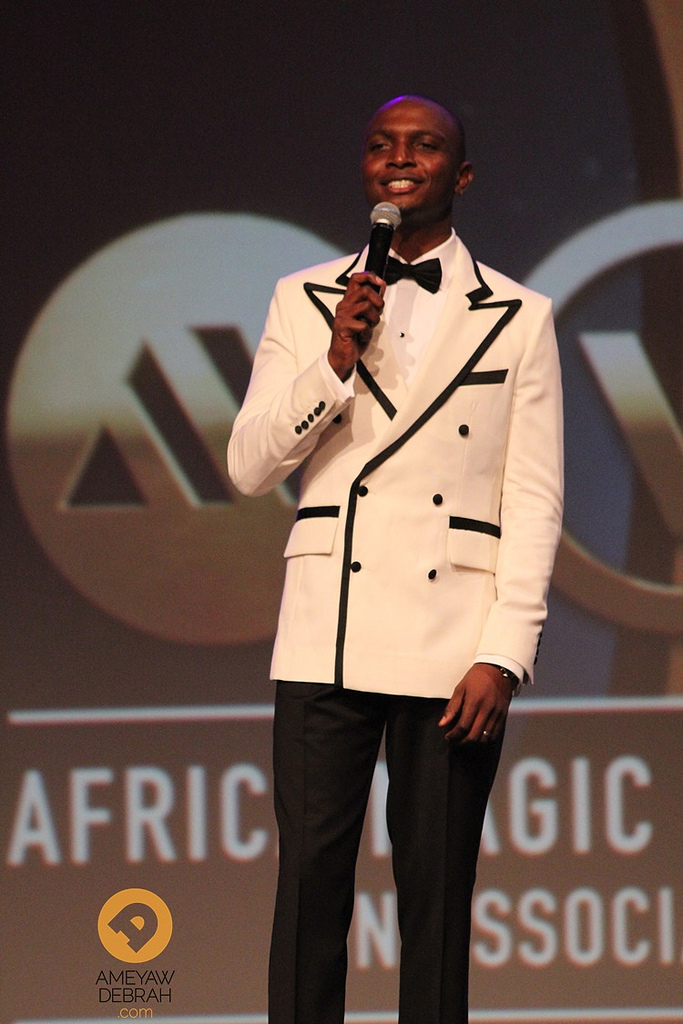
IK Osakioduwa

== Teams ==
Color key

- Winner
- Runner-up
- Third place
- Fourth place
- Eliminated in the live shows
- Stolen in the Battle rounds
- Eliminated in the battle rounds
- Withdrew

Coaches	Top 48 Artists				
Yemi Alade					
Yemi Alade	Syemca	ChrisRio	Wilson	Ifeoma	Majeeka
Yemi Alade	Jahnomso	Oge	Bunmi	~~J'dess~~	~~Wolei~~
Yemi Alade	~~Yimika~~	Olla	Tori	Shayee	
Waje					
Waje	Wow	J'dess	Shapera	Glowrie	Arewa
Waje	Obichi	Favour	Efezino	~~Daniel~~	~~Wilson~~
Waje	~~Amarachi~~	Paulyn	Zorah	ZicSaloma	
Timi Dakolo					
Timi Dakolo	Idyl	Jahtel	Bada	Precious	Amarachi
Timi Dakolo	Wolei	Victor 888	Kendris	Happiness	Gee
Timi Dakolo	Grace	Blessed	Tara & Bella	Sandra	Nwando
Patoranking					
Patoranking	Ebube	Yimika	Afolayan	Hightee	Voke
Patoranking	Kessydriz	Daniel	Annie C	~~Syemca~~	~~Favour~~
Patoranking	Grey	Blesyn	Ese	TamaNisa	

== Battles ==
The Battles advisors were Bez and Darey for all teams. Bez coached the artists on their vocals while Darey coached them on their stage performance.

Coaches could steal two losing artists and advance them to the next round.
Coach Timi made an exception as he paired three acts together to battle because he turned for "Tara & Bella" after his team was full in the blind auditions.

At the end of the battles each coach had six original artists and two stolen artists making up eight advancing artists on their team.

Color key

Artist won the Battle and advances
Artist lost the Battle but was stolen by another coach and advances
Artist lost the Battle and was eliminated

Coach	Order	Winner	Song	Loser	'Steal' result			
Coach	Order	Winner	Song	Loser	Pato	Yemi	Waje	Timi
Yemi Alade	1	Chris Rio	"More Than Words"	J'dess	✔	—N/a	✔	✔
Yemi Alade	2	Majekka	"Toh Bad"	Wolei	—	—N/a	—	✔
Yemi Alade	3	Bunmi	"Eye Adaba"	Yimika	✔	—N/a	—	✔
Yemi Alade	4	Ifeoma	"I'm Every Woman"	Olla	—	—N/a	—	—
Yemi Alade	5	Oge	"Firework"	Tori	—	—N/a	—	—
Yemi Alade	6	Jahnomso	—N/a	Shayee 1	—N/a	—N/a	—N/a	—N/a
Waje	1	Wow	"Jealous"	Paulyn	—	—N/a	—	—
Waje	2	Shapera	"Whataya Want from Me"	Zorah	—	—	—N/a	—
Waje	3	Obichi	"Romantic"	ZicSaloma	—	—	—N/a	—
Waje	4	Glowrie	"Hurt You"	Wilson	—	✔	—N/a	—
Waje	5	Arewa	"What I Did for Love"	Amarachi	—	—	—N/a	✔
Waje	6	Efezino	"Àwé"	Daniel	✔	—	—N/a	—
Patoranking	1	Ebube	"Suit and Tie"	Grey	—N/a	—	—	—
Patoranking	2	Hightee	"No Air"	Blesyn	—N/a	—	—	—
Patoranking	3	Afolayan	"Drag Me Down"	Syemca	—N/a	✔	✔	✔
Patoranking	4	Voke	"Wanted"	Ese	—N/a	—	—	—
Patoranking	5	Kessydriz	"Na Gode"	Favour	—N/a	—	✔	—
Patoranking	6	Annie C	"Beneath Your Beautiful"	Tama Nisa	—N/a	—	—	—
Timi Dakolo	1	Idyl	"Love Me Now"	Happiness	—	—	—	—N/a
Timi Dakolo	2	Jahtel	"The Woman I Love"	Gee	—	—	—	—N/a
Timi Dakolo	4	Precious	"When a Man Loves a Woman"	Grace	—	—	—	—N/a
Timi Dakolo	4	Bada	"Signed, Sealed, Delivered I'm Yours"	Blessed	—	—	—	—N/a
Timi Dakolo	5	Kendris	If Love Is A Crime	Nwando	—	—	—	—N/a
Timi Dakolo	6	Victor	"Ain't No Mountain High Enough"	Sandra	—	—	—	—N/a
Timi Dakolo	6	Victor	"Ain't No Mountain High Enough"	Tara & Bella	—	—	—	—N/a

== Live shows ==
=== Top 32 ===
The live shows kicked off with solo performances by the Top 32 artists, with two artists from each team advancing based on their coach's choice while two from the remaining six artists advanced based on public's vote.
Each team had four advancing artists, making a total of sixteen artists advancing to the next round.

Stage	Coach	S/N	Artist	Song	Result
Top 32	Yemi Alade	1	Syemca	"Remember the Time"	Saved
Top 32	Yemi Alade	2	Chris Rio	"Stitches"	Saved
Top 32	Yemi Alade	3	Ifeoma	"Rise Up"	Saved
Top 32	Yemi Alade	4	Wilson	"No More Drama"	Saved
Top 32	Yemi Alade	5	Bunmi	"Want You"	Eliminated
Top 32	Yemi Alade	6	Majekka	"Yolo Yolo"	Eliminated
Top 32	Yemi Alade		Jahnomso	"Show Me Love"	Eliminated
Top 32	Yemi Alade		Oge	"Love Don't Cost a Thing"	Eliminated
Top 32	Timi Dakolo	1	Idyl	"Prisoner"	Saved
Top 32	Timi Dakolo	2	Jahtel	"Something's Got A Hold On Me"	Saved
Top 32	Timi Dakolo	3	Precious	"I Have Nothing"	Saved
Top 32	Timi Dakolo	4	Bada	"Beautiful Girls"	Saved
Top 32	Timi Dakolo	5	Amarachi	"No"	Eliminated
Top 32	Timi Dakolo	6	Wolei	"Ara"	Eliminated
Top 32	Timi Dakolo	7	Victor	"Jaiye Ori Mi"	Eliminated
Top 32	Timi Dakolo	8	Kendris	"24K Magic"	Eliminated
Top 32	Patoranking	1	Ebube	"Am I Wrong"	Saved
Top 32	Patoranking	2	Yimika	"Sade"	Saved
Top 32	Patoranking	3	Hightee	"Doo Wop (That Thing)"	Saved
Top 32	Patoranking	4	Afolayan	"E No Easy"	Saved
Top 32	Patoranking	5	Kessydriz	"What's Love Got To Do With It"	Eliminated
Top 32	Patoranking	6	Annie C	"No Ordinary Love"	Eliminated
Top 32	Patoranking	7	Voke	"Ladies And Gentlemen"	Eliminated
Top 32	Patoranking	8	Daniel	"Perfect"	Eliminated
Top 32	Waje	1	Wow	"Get Down On It"	Saved
Top 32	Waje	2	J'dess	"Is It Because I Love You"	Saved
Top 32	Waje	3	Glowrie	"Hello"	Saved
Top 32	Waje	4	Shapera	"She Wolf (Falling to Pieces)"	Saved
Top 32	Waje	5	Arewa	"Unbreak My Heart"	Eliminated
Top 32	Waje	6	Efezino	"Rockabye"	Eliminated
Top 32	Waje	7	Favour	"All Over"	Eliminated
Top 32	Waje	8	Obichi	"Freedom"	Eliminated

=== Top 16 ===
Stage	Coach	S/N	Artist	Song	Result
Top 16	Timi Dakolo	1	Idyl	"Shape of You"	Saved
Top 16	Timi Dakolo	2	Jahtel	"And I'm Telling You I'm Not Going"	Saved
Top 16	Timi Dakolo	3	Bada	"To Love Somebody"	Eliminated
Top 16	Timi Dakolo	4	Precious	"Ego"	Eliminated
Top 16	Waje	1	Wow	"Incomplete"	Saved
Top 16	Waje	2	J'dess	"Love on the Brain"	Saved
Top 16	Waje	3	Glowrie	"He Lives In Me"	Eliminated
Top 16	Waje	4	Shapera	"I Wanna Dance With Somebody"	Eliminated
Top 16	Yemi Alade	1	Syemca	"Dancing On My Own"	Saved
Top 16	Yemi Alade	2	Chris Rio	"Beautiful"	Saved
Top 16	Yemi Alade	3	Ifeoma	"I'm Alive"	Eliminated
Top 16	Yemi Alade	4	Wilson	"Joy"	Eliminated
Top 16	Patoranking	1	Ebube	"The Hills"	Saved
Top 16	Patoranking	2	Yimika	"You & I (Nobody in the World)"	Saved
Top 16	Patoranking	3	Afolayan	"Don't You Worry Child"	Eliminated
Top 16	Patoranking	4	Hightee	"Iba"	Eliminated

=== Semi-finals ===
Stage	Coach	S/N	Artist	Song	Result
Top 8	Timi Dakolo	1	Idyl	"Soul Provider"	Saved
Top 8	Timi Dakolo	2	Jahtel	"Proud Mary"	Eliminated
Top 8	Yemi Alade	1	Syemca	"Unsteady"	Saved
Top 8	Yemi Alade	2	Chris Rio	"Baby Can I Hold You"	Eliminated
Top 8	Waje	1	Wow	"Ejeajo"	Saved
Top 8	Waje	2	J'dess	"Ekwe"	Eliminated
Top 8	Patoranking	1	Ebube	"One and Only"	Saved
Top 8	Patoranking	2	Yimika	"Mama"	Eliminated

=== Finale ===
Coach	Artist	Solo Song	Result	Final Song	Result
Timi Dakolo	Idyl	"You suppose Know"	Saved	"This Time"	Winner
Patoranking	Ebube	"Come Closer"	Saved	"I'm Your Angel"	Runner-up
Yemi Alade	Syemca	"The Matter"	Eliminated		Third Place
Waje	Wow	"Fada Fada"	Eliminated		Fourth Place

== Results summary ==
Result's colour key
Artist was eliminated

Weekly results per artist
Contestant	Week 1	Week 2	Week 3	
Contestant	Week 1	Week 2	Round 1	Round 2
Idyl	Safe	Safe	Safe	Winner
Ebube	Safe	Safe	Safe	Runner-up
Syemca	Safe	Safe	Safe	Third place
Wow	Safe	Safe	Safe	Fourth place
Jahtel	Safe	Safe	Eliminated	Eliminated (Week 3)
Yimika	Safe	Safe	Eliminated	Eliminated (Week 3)
Chris Rio	Safe	Safe	Eliminated	Eliminated (Week 3)
J'dess	Safe	Safe	Eliminated	Eliminated (Week 3)
Bada	Safe	Eliminated	Eliminated (Week 2)	
Precious	Safe	Eliminated	Eliminated (Week 2)	
Afolayan	Safe	Eliminated	Eliminated (Week 2)	
Hightee	Safe	Eliminated	Eliminated (Week 2)	
Wilson	Safe	Eliminated	Eliminated (Week 2)	
Ifeoma	Safe	Eliminated	Eliminated (Week 2)	
Glowrie	Safe	Eliminated	Eliminated (Week 2)	
Shapera	Safe	Eliminated	Eliminated (Week 2)	
Wolei	Eliminated	Eliminated (Week 3)		
Amarachi	Eliminated	Eliminated (Week 3)		
Victor	Eliminated	Eliminated (Week 3)		
Kendris	Eliminated	Eliminated (Week 3)		
Daniel	Eliminated	Eliminated (Week 3)		
Kessydriz	Eliminated	Eliminated (Week 3)		
Voke	Eliminated	Eliminated (Week 3)		
Annie C	Eliminated	Eliminated (Week 3)		
Majekka	Eliminated	Eliminated (Week 3)		
Bunmi	Eliminated	Eliminated (Week 3)		
Jahnomso	Eliminated	Eliminated (Week 3)		
Oge	Eliminated	Eliminated (Week 3)		
Favour	Eliminated	Eliminated (Week 3)		
Efezino	Eliminated	Eliminated (Week 3)		
Arewa	Eliminated	Eliminated (Week 3)		
Obichi	Eliminated	Eliminated (Week 3)		

== Notes ==
- ^ Note 1 : Shayee from team Yemi withdrew from the competition due to some reasons therefore his battle partner (Jahnomso) automatically advanced to the lives.
