= Efezino =

Nigerian singer, songwriter, and performer

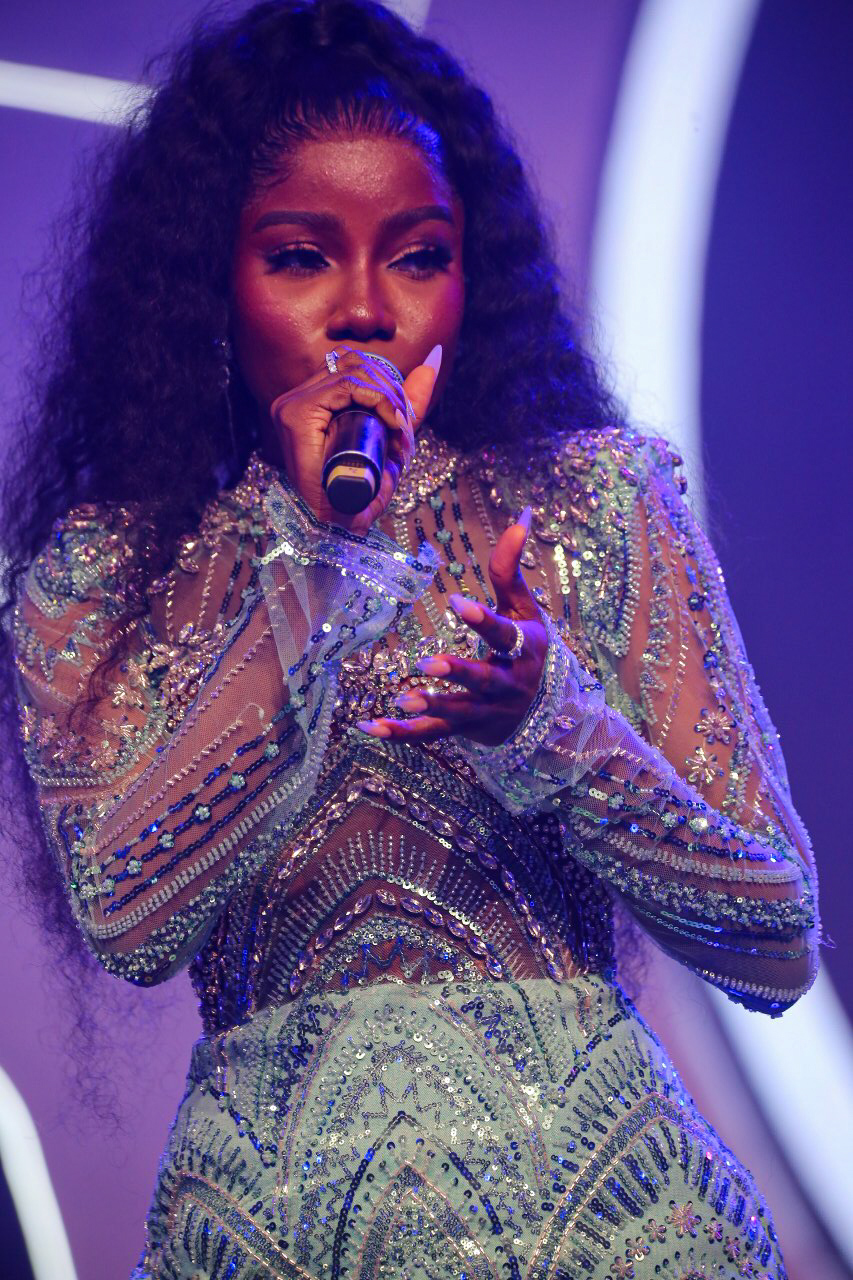
- Efezino performing at the Air Peace 10th anniversary celebration in 2024

Background information
- Born: Efezino Majiri Akpo; Delta State, Nigeria
- Origin: Nigeria
- Genres: AfroPop, AfroFolk, Soul
- Occupations: Singer, songwriter, performer
- Instruments: Vocals, Acoustic guitar
- Years active: 2010–present
- Labels: Independent Artist, Soltracka (former)

Efezino Majiri Akpo, known professionally as Efezino, is a Nigerian singer, songwriter, and performer. Her music blends Afropop, Folk and soul, with lyrics that explore themes such as love, self-discovery, and African culture. She gained prominence through her participation in talent competitions, collaborations with notable African artists and her debut single, Amere.

== Early life and education ==
Efezino was born in Delta State, Nigeria, into a family with a strong musical background. She grew up in Warri, where her passion for music began at the age of 8, singing in her church choir. Over time, she drew inspiration from diverse musical genres, including jazz, pop, folk, and soul.

In 2014, she earned a Bachelor of Science degree in Human Anatomy from Delta State University.

== Career ==
Efezino's professional career began when she won the "Who Sings Best" talent competition at age 17. She later participated in the first and third seasons of Nigerian Idol, reaching the top six during the third season. In 2017, she competed in the second season of The Voice Nigeria, advancing to the live show rounds.

She has worked as a demo singer for several international artists, including Rihanna, Brandy, and Asa, and provided backup vocals for prominent African musicians such as Simi and Adekunle Gold. She has also collaborated with artists like The Cavemen, Paul Okoye (Rudeboy), Zoro, and Falz.

Efezino's voice has been featured in various brand jingles, including those for Delta Soap, Maggi, and DStv's Fix it on the go.

== Music releases ==
Efezino released her debut EP, Amere, in 2019, which was followed by Memory Box in 2024, The latter, a collection of songs reflecting her personal experiences, has been praised as a masterclass in storytelling.

== Discography ==
=== EPs ===
- Amere (2019)
- Memory Box (2024)

=== Singles ===
- Amere (2018)
- Totori (2021)
- Ulome (2021)

== Tours and performances ==
In 2022, Efezino joined Nigerian singer Simi on a tour of the United States, showcasing her music to an international audience.
