= Merry Christmas, Darling (album) =

Studio album by Timi Dakolo
- Released: November 22, 2019
- Recorded: Abbey Road Studios (London, England); Libreville, Gabon; Budapest, Hungary; Lagos, Nigeria; Los Angeles, California
- Genre: R&B
- Length: 44:22
- Label: Virgin EMI
- Producers: Humberto Gatica; Timi Dakolo

Timi Dakolo chronology
Beautiful Noise (2011)	Merry Christmas, Darling (2019)

Professional ratings
Review scores
Source	Rating
The Yorkshire Times	3/5 stars

Merry Christmas, Darling is the second studio album recorded by Nigerian singer Timi Dakolo. It was released by Virgin EMI Records on November 2, 2019 and co-produced by Dakolo and Humberto Gatica.

== Production and recording ==
The album was recorded in multiple locations including Abbey Road Studios, as well as Libreville, Budapest, Lagos and Los Angeles. It was executively produced by Ali Bongo Ondimba and Efe Ogbeni.

Merry Christmas, Darling is Dakolo's first Christmas album and features Emeli Sandé, Eric Benét, Kenny G, Laura Bretan and the Eben Voices of Gabon Choir.

== Track listing ==
No.	Title	Writer(s)	Length
1.	"Merry Christmas, Darling" (with Emeli Sandé)	Richard Carpenter; Frank Pooler	3:17
2.	"The Christmas Song"	Mel Tormé; Robert Wells	4:11
3.	"Have Yourself a Merry Little Christmas"	Ralph Blane; Hugh Martin	3:34
4.	"Mary, Did You Know?"	Buddy Greene; Mark Lowry	3:47
5.	"White Christmas" (with Eric Benét)	Irving Berlin	4:04
6.	"It's Beginning to Look a Lot Like Christmas"	Meredith Willson	3:31
7.	"I'll Be Home for Christmas"	Kim Gannon; Walter Kent; Buck Ram	4:16
8.	"Decorate the Night" (with Kenny G)	Wray Chafin; Dobie Gray; Bud Reneau	3:35
9.	"Hallelujah" (with The Eben Voices of Gabon Choir)	Leonard Cohen	3:54
10.	"Silent Night" (with Laura Bretan)	Franz Xaver Gruber; Joseph Mohr	3:43
11.	"Where Did We Go Wrong (Cry)"	Cobhams Asuquo; Timi Dakolo; Efe Ogbeni	6:30
Total length:			44:22
