= A'rese =

Nigerian actress and singer

A'rese Emokpae (born January 13, 1988) known simply as A'rese is a Nigerian actress, singer, and audiobook narrator. She first garnered attention as a stage actress starring in Bolanle Austen-Peters' Terra Kulture production Wakaa: The Musical which led her to participate in and win the first season of The Voice Nigeria. In 2017 she gained popularity for her lead role as Senami Minasu in Africa Magic's hit series Jemeji. In the same year, she released her first single "Uwe No".

== Background ==
A'rese was born into the arts. Her grandfather is the Nigerian painter and sculptor, Erhabor Emokpae.

== Education ==
A'rese attended Washington and Lee University where she first discovered her love for musical theater and dance. She graduated with a Bachelor of Arts degree with a major in Visual Art, specializing in Printmaking. After starring as "Velma Kelly" in the school's sold-out production of hit Broadway musical Chicago, she decided to pursue a career in the performing arts. She has been performing professionally ever since she graduated in 2010.

== Career ==
Emokpae's professional career began in Chicago, Illinois where she was a company member at the Black Ensemble Theater. Some of her most notable roles at the theater were as The Fairy Godmama in The Other Cinderella and as Mya in One Name Only. After working successfully there for 3 years, she decided to move back to Lagos, Nigeria to further pursue her acting career.

In 2014, she landed her first notable role in Lagos as Rume in BAP Productions' Saro: the Musical 2 which had a sold-out run both during the Christmas holiday period in December 2014 and again during Easter 2015. She then continued on to star as Kike Johnson in the next hit production out of the BAP/Terra Kulture stable, Wakaa: The Musical.

In 2016, Emokpae auditioned for the inaugural season of The Voice Nigeria. She made it to the televised "Blind Audition" stage where she sang "Skyfall" turning three of the coaches' chairs. She chose to be part of Team Waje. In the grand final, she faced Chike from Team Patoranking. A'rese sang "Hallelujah" finishing as winner with Chike ending up as runner-up.

Following her win, Emokpae was signed to Universal Music Group; with whom she released her first single Uwe No.

In 2017, she landed her first non-stage leading role as Senami Minasu in Jemeji, an Africa Magic series. She then went on to another lead role in a new EbonyLife TV series called "MMM".

== Filmography ==
=== Television ===
Year	Title	Network	Role	Notes
2016	The Voice Nigeria	Africa Magic	Self	Reality Show
2016	Babysitting Ejiro	Africa Magic	Kemi	Television movie
2016-2017	Tinsel	Africa Magic	Bisola	Unknown # of episodes
2017-2018	Jemeji	Africa Magic	Senami Minasu	260 episodes
2021	M.M.M.	LacedUp Productions	Marion	Web Series

=== Theater ===
Year	Show	Role	Notes
2012	The Marvin Gaye Story	Mary Wells/Ensemble	Black Ensemble Theater; Chicago, IL
2012	One Name Only	Mya	Black Ensemble Theater; Chicago, IL
2012	The Other Cinderella	Fairy Godmamma	Black Ensemble Theater; Chicago, IL
2013	Once Upon A People	The Storyteller	Black Ensemble Theater; Chicago, IL
2013	She Kills Monsters	Vera (u/s)	Buzz22 Chicago at Steppenwolf; Chicago, IL
2014-2015	Saro: The Musical 2	Rume	BAP Productions/Terra Kulture
2015	Wakaa: The Musical	Kike Johnson	BAP Productions/Terra Kulture

=== Movies ===
- Unbreakable (2019)

== Discography ==
=== Singles ===
Year	Song title	Artist	Album
2017	"Uwe No"	A'rese ft. LadiPoe	Uwe No - Single
2018	"Beautiful"	A'rese	Beautiful - Single

=== Collaborations ===
Year	Song title	Artist	Album
2017	"Out Of My League"	Dominic Neill ft. A'rese	Out Of My League
2017	"#WCW"	Kalen Lumiere ft. A'rese	Realistic Love
2017	"Birds 'n' Bees"	Kalen Lumiere ft. A'rese	Realistic Love

== Awards and nominations ==
Year	Award	Category	Film	Result	Ref
2019	Best of Nollywood Awards	Best Actress in a Lead role –English	Unbreakable	Nominated	

Awards and achievements
Preceded by N/A	The Voice Nigeria; Winner; 2016	Succeeded by Idyl
