= Esther Benyeogo =

Nigerian Gospel singer and music reality show winner

- Born: Esther Ebelechukwu Benyeogo; 15 September 1997 (age 28); Asaba, Delta
- Occupations: Singer; songwriter; Vocalist
- Years active: 2012 - present
- Musical career
- Genres: Gospel singer
- Instruments: Vocals, Guitar
- Label: Universal Music Group

Esther Benyeogo (born September 15, 1997), is a Nigerian gospel singer, songwriter and recording artist. She was the winner of Season 3 of The Voice Nigeria and previously winner of God's Children Great Talent (GCGT) Season 7 beating other nine finalists winning N250 million management deal, N10 million cash and a brand new car.

== Early life ==
Esther was born on September 15, 1997, as the last of six children to the family of Dr. and Mrs. Kennedy Benyeogo from Ika North Local Government Area in Delta State. Her late father was a medical doctor who passed on in 2010 while her mother is a retired school principal. She grew up in Asaba, Delta state and studied English and Literature at the University of Benin.

She started singing at the age of thirteen and her style of singing is greatly influenced by Tasha Cobbs, Sinach, Yolanda Adams, Kierra Sheard, Kim Burrell, Nathaniel Bassey. At fifteen, she emerged as the first runners-up in the Next Big Teen talent competition organized by Christ Embassy.

In 2017, at the age of nineteen, Esther emerged as the winner of the God's Children's Great Talent (GCGT) Season 7 beating the other nine finalists to win a 250 million Naira management contract, 10 million Naira cash, and a brand new Kia Rio. She then released her first EP named “Carry Me ” in 2020.

In July 2021, after an 18-weeks long competition, she was announced as the winner of the Voice Nigeria reality TV series, ahead of five other finalists to receive a cash reward of 10 Million Naira, an SUV, and a recording contract from Universal Music Group.

== Discography ==
=== Albums ===
- Carry Me (2020) Ep

=== Singles ===
- “How Great Thou Art”
- "Generation"
- "It's Working"
- "Halleluyah"
