= The Voice Nigeria =

Reality television singing competition

- Genre: Reality; Talent show
- Created by: John de Mol Jr.
- Based on: The Voice of Holland
- Presented by: IK Osakioduwa (1–2); Stephanie Coker (1–3); Toke Makinwa (3–); Nancy Isime (3–)
- Judges: Waje (1–4); Yemi Alade (2–3); 2Baba (1); Patoranking (1–2); Timi Dakolo (1–2); Darey (3); Falz (3); Naeto C (4); Niyola (4); Praiz (4)
- Theme music composer: Martijn Schimmer
- Opening theme: This is The Voice
- Ending theme: This is The Voice
- Country of origin: Nigeria
- Original language: English
- No. of seasons: 4
- No. of episodes: 43

Production
- Executive producers: Season 1 and 2 - M-net, Season 3 - Un1ty Limited, Livespot360
- Editor: Sasani Studios
- Running time: 60–120 byminutes
- Production companies: Talpa Media, Season 3 - Un1ty Limited, Livespot360

Original release
- Network: Africa Magic Urban; Africa Magic Showcase
- Release: 10 April 2016 – 8 October 2017
- Release: 27 March 2021 – 21 May 2023

The Voice Nigeria is the Nigerian franchise of the TV series The Voice. It is a singing competition that features music enthusiasts and professional performers. Since its first edition in 2016 in Nigeria, the show has become the biggest rival to the Nigerian Idol. It has also produced many talents and celebrated artistes in the country and Africa at large.

== Blinds ==
This is the beginning of where coaches would have to build their team which should consist of 6 talents.

As the name implies, at this stage, the coaches’ chairs are turned towards the audience while the talent perform, if any of the coaches finds interest in the talent, he/she would have to hit the buzzer (red button) while their chair turns to face the talents. If there is more than one interested coach, the talent will have to select whose team he/she would want to belong, after all interested coaches pitch for the talent.

== Live shows ==
After the battle rounds comes the Live Shows. In this stage, each of the talents perform a song given by their coach, and the coach saves one out of every four talents while the rest are left to public votes. Public votes save one talent out of each team every week while the rest are evicted. The talents are cut from 32 to 16 to 12 to 8 of them who qualify for the finals. From the top 8, the winner and runner up are decided by the public votes.

== Coaches and presenters ==
=== Coaches timeline ===
Timeline of coaches
Coach	Seasons			
Coach	1	2	3	4
Waje				
Patoranking				
2Baba				
Timi Dakolo				
Yemi Alade				
Darey				
Falz				
Naeto C				
Niyola				
Praiz				

Coaches gallery

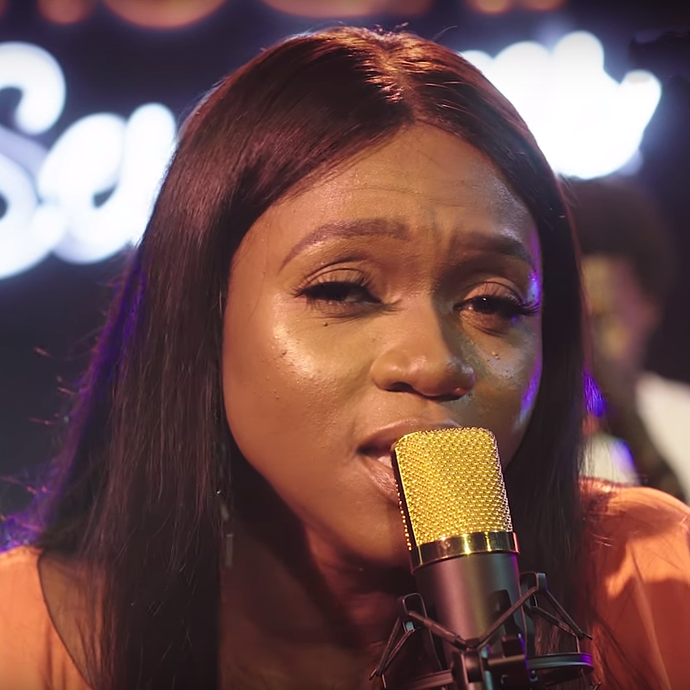
Waje (2016–2022)

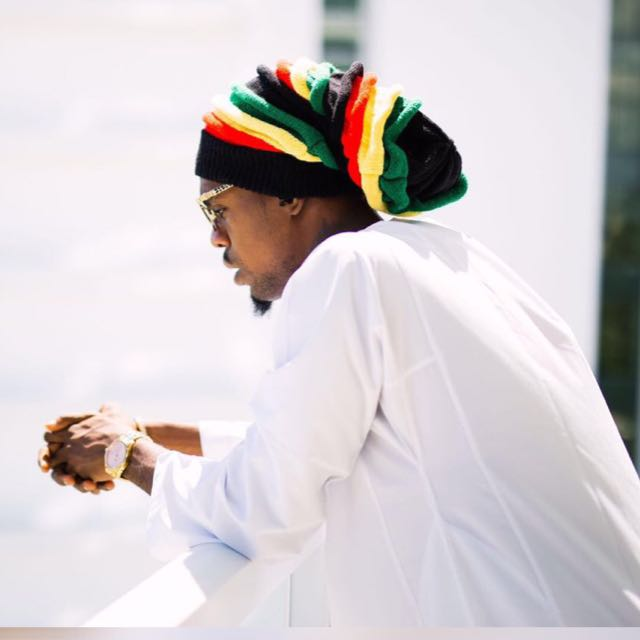
Patoranking (2016–2017)

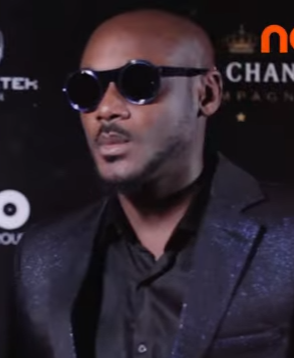
2Baba (2016)

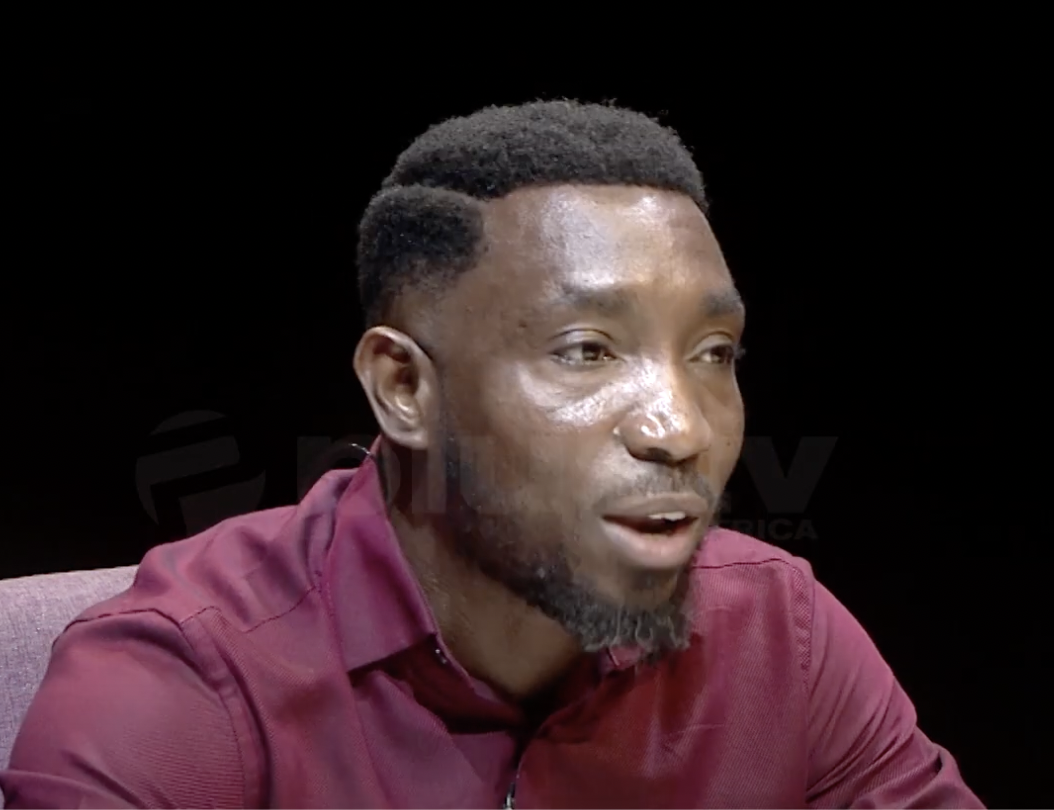
Timi Dakolo (2016–2017)

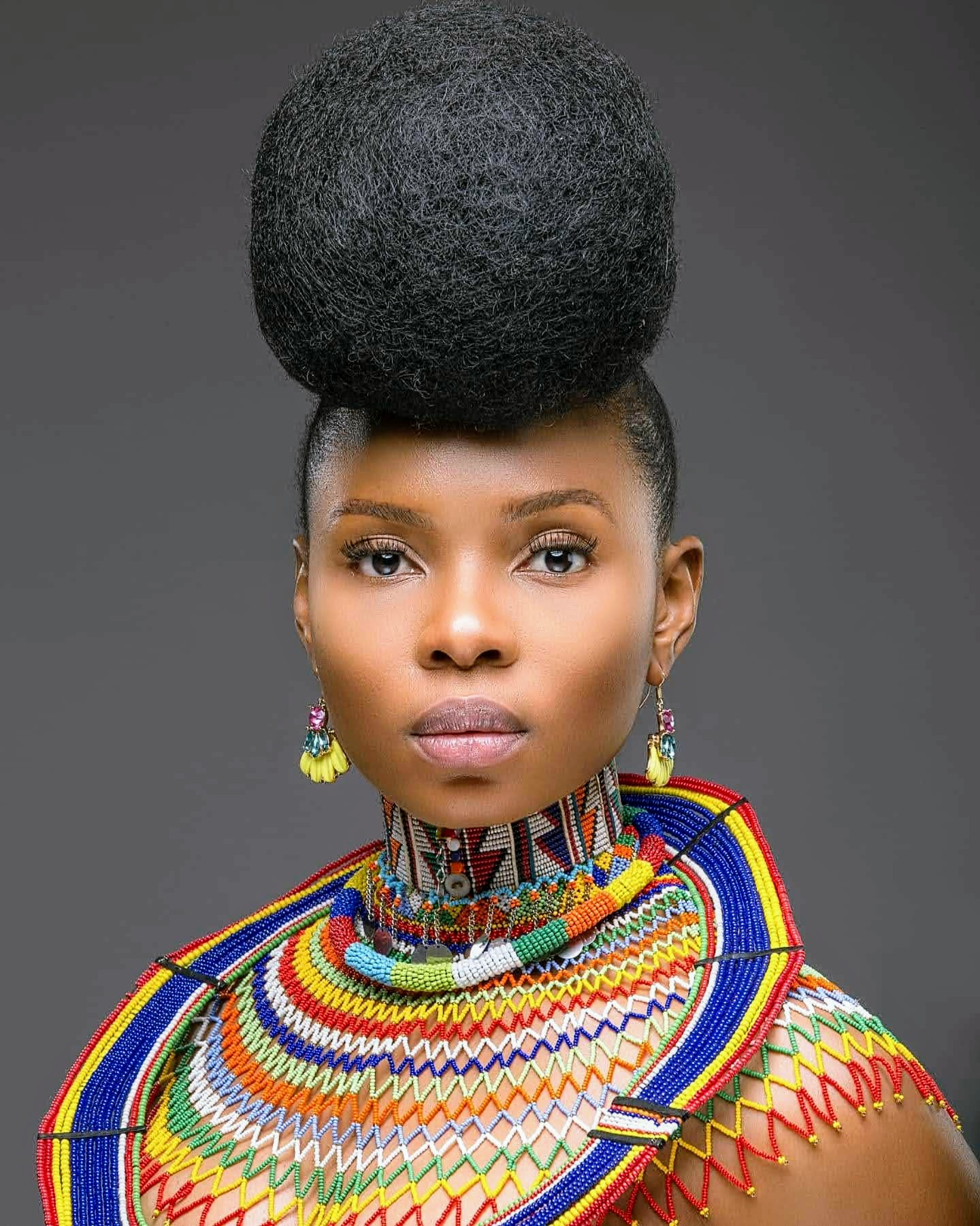
Yemi Alade (2017, 2021)

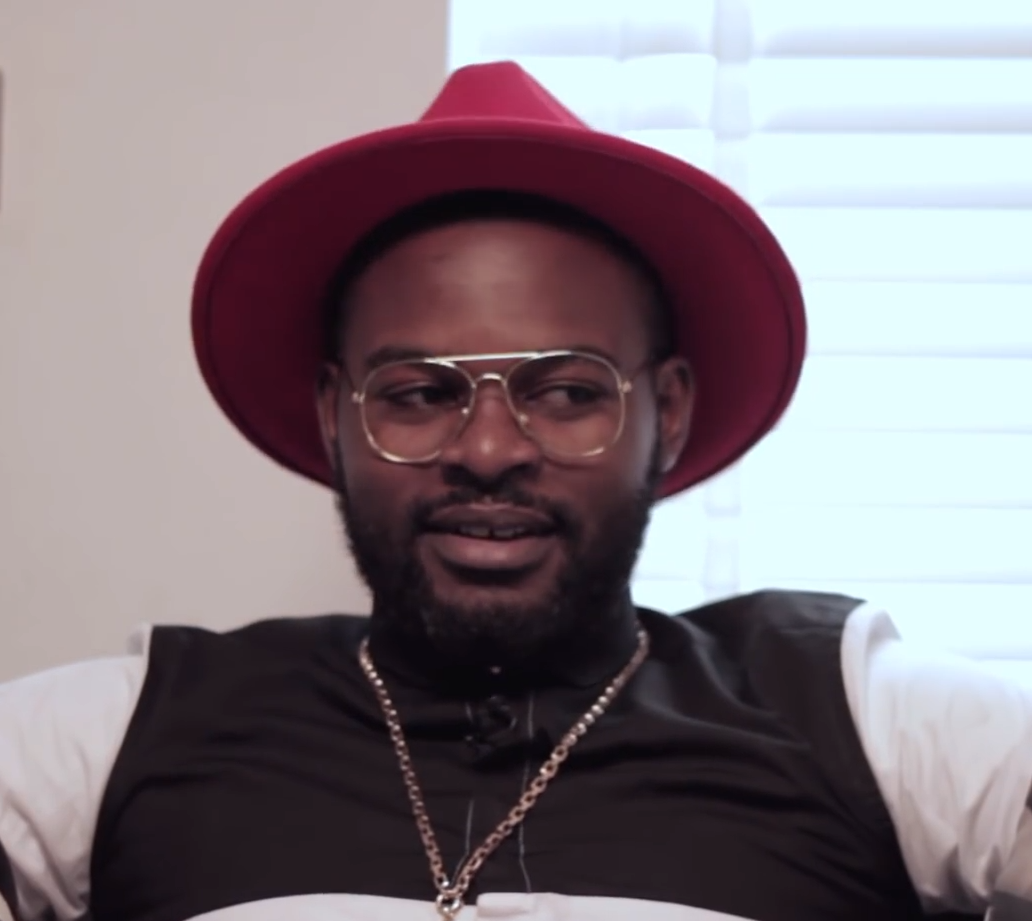
Falz (2021)

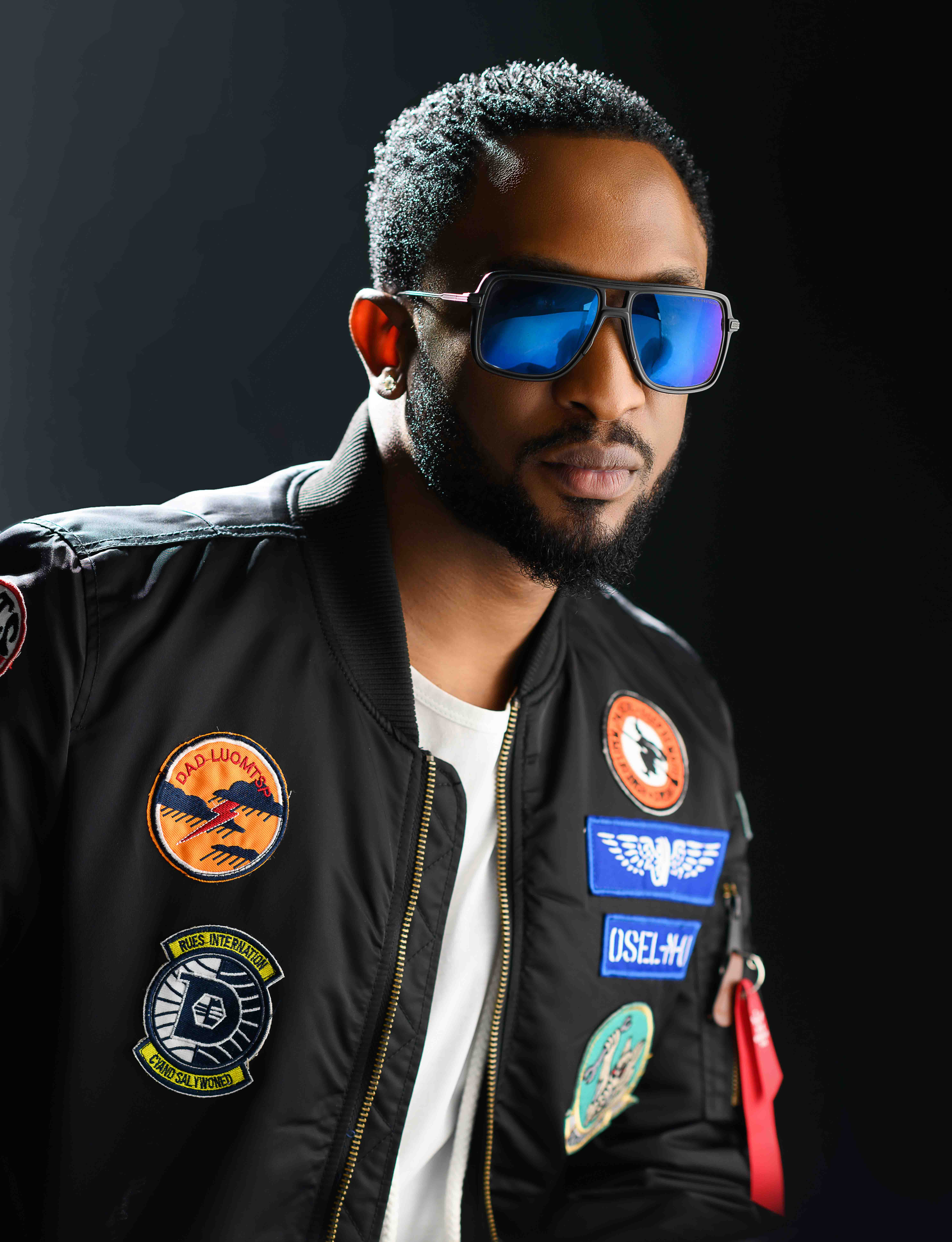
Darey (2021)

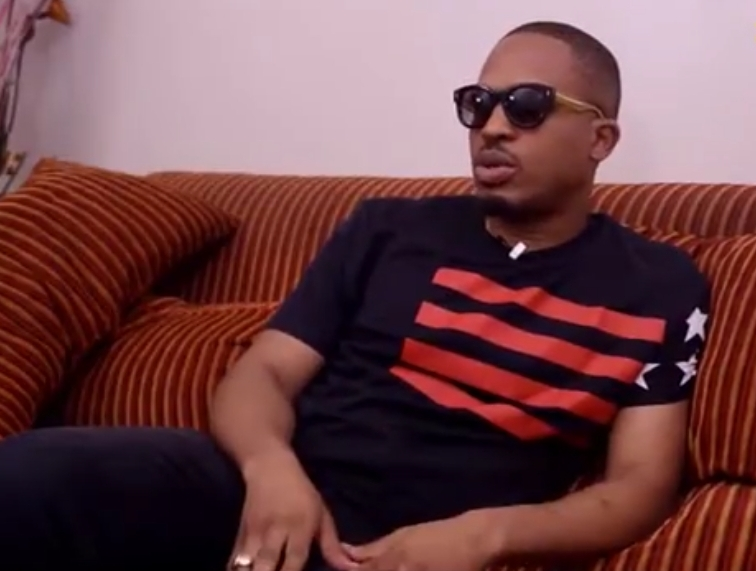
Naeto C (2022)

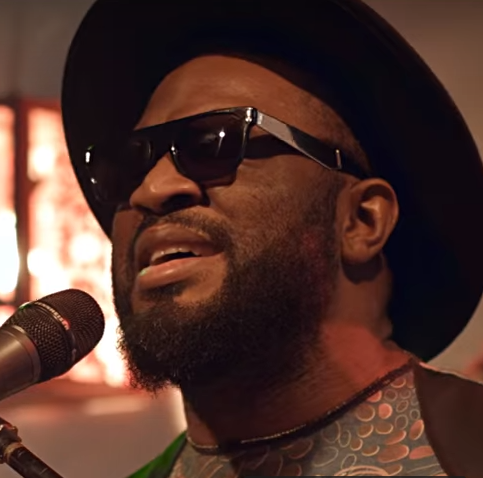
Praiz (2022)

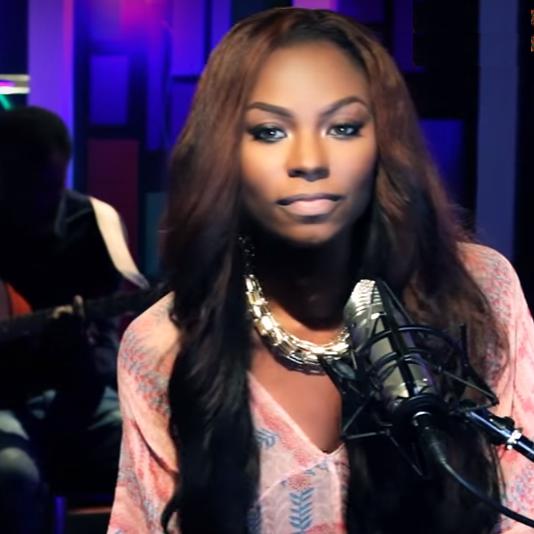
Niyola (2022)

=== Presenters timeline ===
Host	Seasons			
Host	1	2	3	4
IK Osakioduwa				
Stephanie Coker				
Toke Makinwa				
Nancy Isime				
Kate Henshaw				
Zainab Balogun				

Key
Main host
Backstage

Presenters gallery

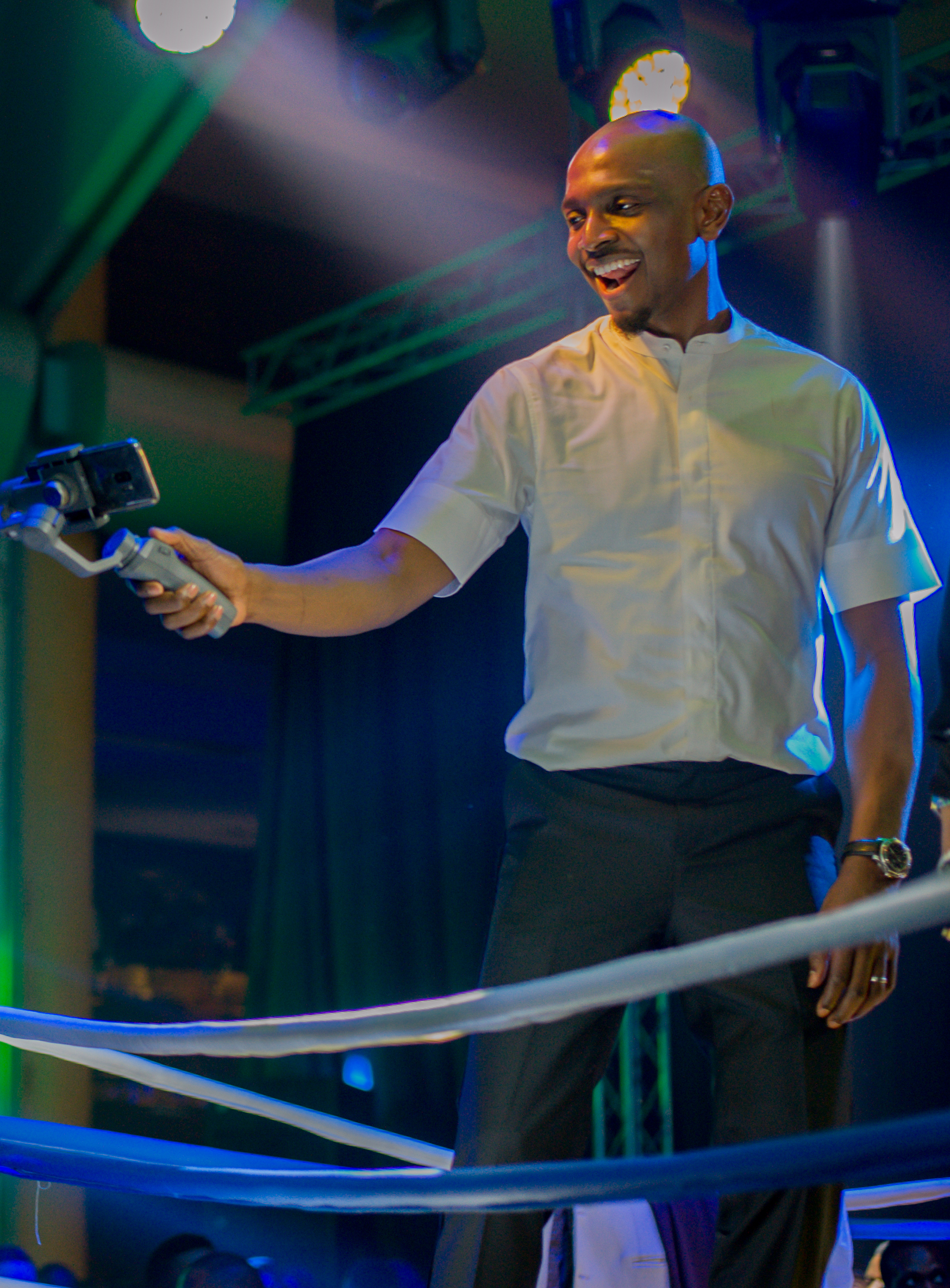
IK Osakioduwa (2016–2017)

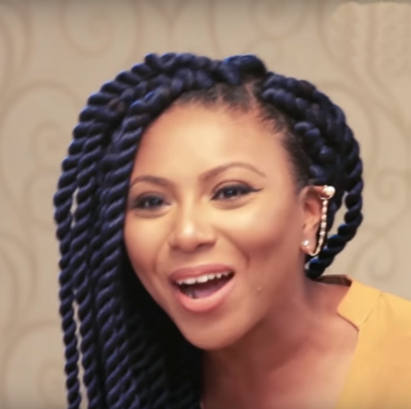
Stephanie Coker (2016–2017)

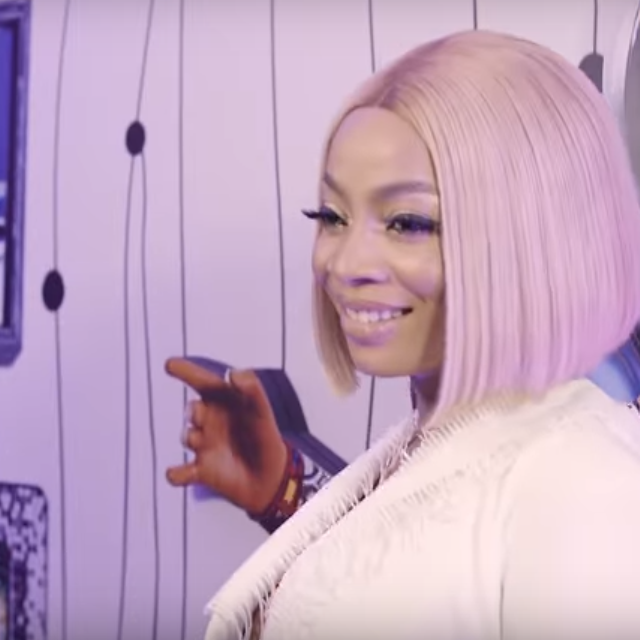
Toke Makinwa (2021)

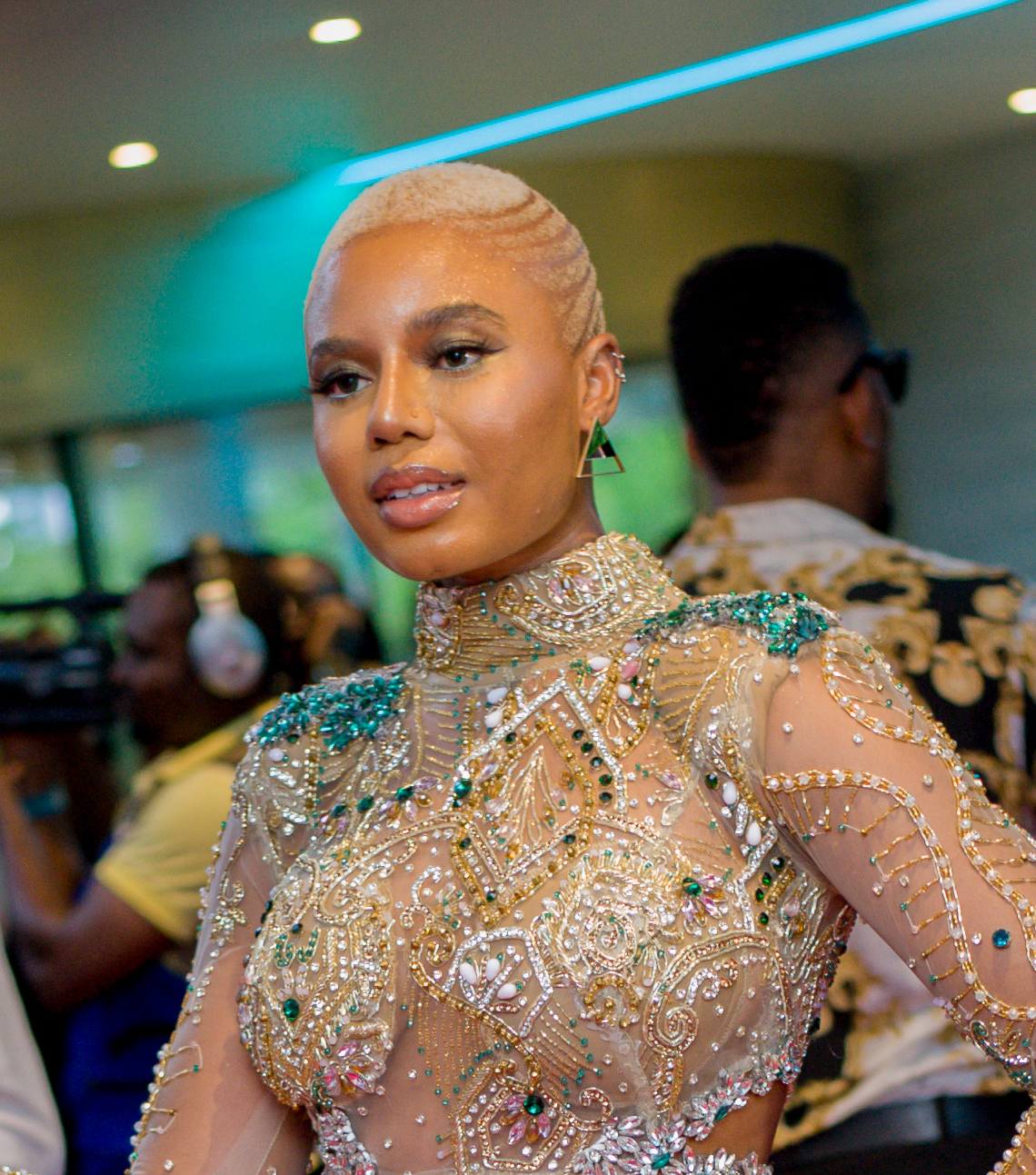
Nancy Isime (2021)

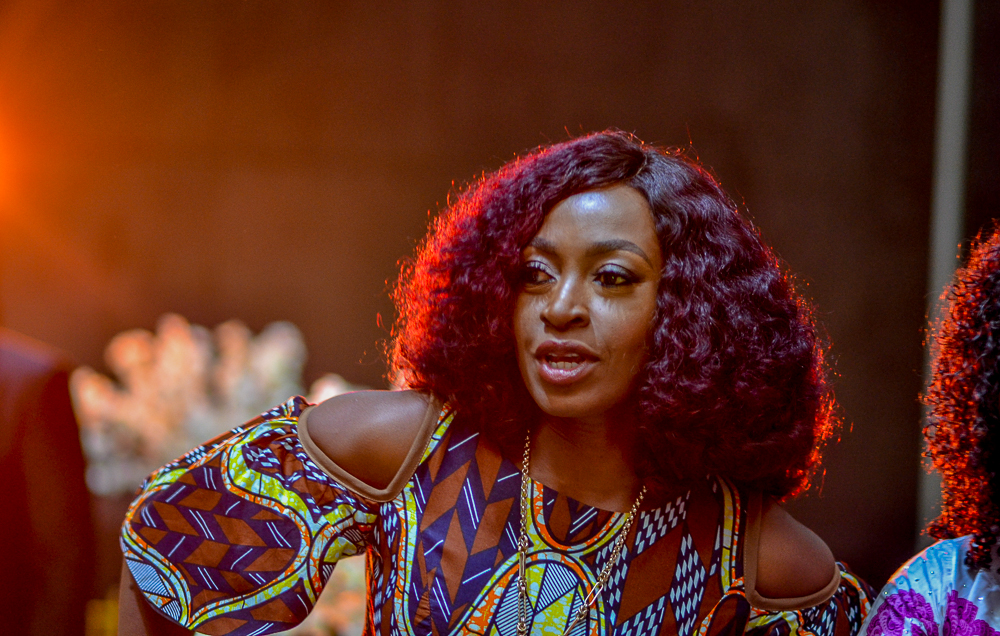
Kate Henshaw (2022)

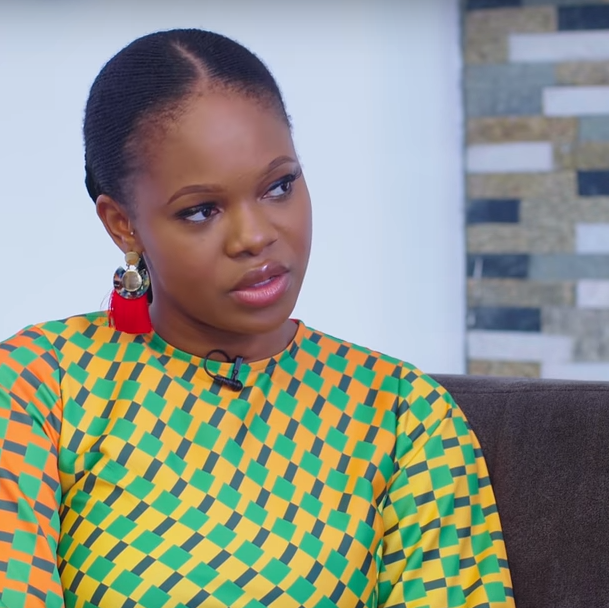
Zainab Balogun (2022)

== Series overview ==
Team Waje
Team 2Baba
Team Patoranking
Team Timi Dakolo
Team Yemi Alade
Team Falz
Team Darey
Team Naeto C
Team Praiz
Team Niyola

Season	First aired	Last aired	Winner	Runner-up	Third place	Fourth place	Winning coach	Presenter		Coaches chair's order			
Season	First aired	Last aired	Winner	Runner-up	Third place	Fourth place	Winning coach	Presenter		1	2	3	4
1	14 Apr 2016	31 July 2016	A'rese	Chike	Cornel	Brenda	Waje	IK Osakioduwa	Stephanie Coker	2Baba	Waje	Patoranking	Timi
2	18 June 2017	8 Oct 2017	Idyl	Ebube	Syemca	Wow	Timi Dakolo	IK Osakioduwa	Stephanie Coker	Patoranking	Yemi	Waje	Timi
3	27 Mar 2021	24 July 2021	Esther Benyeogo	Kpee Okoro	Eazzie	Naomi Mac	Darey	Toke Makinwa	Nancy Isime	Falz	Waje	Yemi	Darey
4	24 Dec 2022	21 May 2023	Pere Jason	Nicole Osarumwense	Queen Jasper	Bhen	Niyola	Kate Henshaw	Zainab Balogun	Praiz	Niyola	Waje	Naeto C

== Season 1 (2016) ==
The opening broadcast was on 10 April 2016. The four coaches for the inaugural season are Nigerian artistes Waje, Timi Dakolo, Patoranking and 2baba aka Tuface (formerly known as 2face Idibia). The programme is hosted by IK Osakioduwa and Stephanie Coker.

== Season 2 (2017) ==
The Voice Nigeria had four coaches like the first season and featured Yemi Alade (a new coach) in place of 2face Idibia. It was also hosted by Ik Osakioduwa and Stephanie Coker. The winner of the edition was Idyl.

=== Teams ===
Coaches	Top 49 artists				
Patoranking					
Patoranking	Flavour Idugbe	Afolayan Adelake	Itunu Ugunyemi	Annie Cedric	Emmanuel Okafor
Patoranking	Tama Misa	Kessy Mbonu	Blessing Isaac	Omuejevoke Ofiokpene	Chukwuemeka Chike
Patoranking	Ebube Obioma	Eserophe "EseQliC" Urinrin Okoro			
Yemi Alade					
Yemi Alade	Jahnmso Liem	Ifeoma Onu	Olanrewaju Omowa	Ogechi Ihenacho	Chris Rio
Yemi Alade	Joy Ebiem	Torisheju Ogbe	Olawole Olusi	Favour Johnson	Yimika Akinola
Yemi Alade	Kelvin Audu	Bunmi Oshin			
Waje					
Waje	Zorah Julius	Wilson Odini	Paulyn Bob	Obichi Marshall	Arewa Comfort
Waje	Shapera Makepeace	Glory Amanyi	Efezino Akpo	Chuks Aniobonam	Amarachi Ugoeke
Waje	Daniel James	Isaac Aloma			
Timi Dakolo					
Timi Dakolo	Emmanuel Precious	Jahtell Item	Daniel Oiongoli	Kendri Ologodi	Blessed Ake
Timi Dakolo	Godwin bada	Sandra Osamor	Nwando Okoli	Victor Thompson	Grace Udoh
Timi Dakolo	Gerald Agwunobi	Happiness Osassumwen	Tara & Bella		

=== Blind Auditions ===
Blind auditions color key
✔	Coach pressed "I WANT YOU" button
	Artist elected a coach's team
	Artist defaulted to a coach's team

Blind auditions results
Episode	Order	Artist	Age	Song	Coach's and artist's choices			
Episode	Order	Artist	Age	Song	Patoranking	Yemi	Waje	Timi
Episode 1 (Sunday, 18 June 2017)	1	Emmanuel Precious	22	Survivor (Destiny's Child song)	✔	✔	✔	✔
Episode 1 (Sunday, 18 June 2017)	2	Zorah Jukius	25	Dangerous Woman (song)	✔	✔	✔	–
Episode 1 (Sunday, 18 June 2017)	3	Jahtell Item	23	Fuckin' Perfect	–	–	✔	✔
Episode 1 (Sunday, 18 June 2017)	4	Johansom Liem	27	Fly Like an Eagle (song)	–	✔	–	–
Episode 1 (Sunday, 18 June 2017)	5	Ifeoma Onu	31	When You Believe	✔	✔	–	–
Episode 1 (Sunday, 18 June 2017)	6	Favour Idugbe	19	Kilon Poppin	✔	✔	✔	✔
Episode 1 (Sunday, 18 June 2017)	7	Afolayan Adelake	27	I'll Make Love to You	✔	–	–	–
Episode 1 (Sunday, 18 June 2017)	8	Olanrewaju Omowa	20	That Stupid Song	–	✔	–	–
Episode 2 (Sunday, 25 June 2017)	1	Daniel Oiongoli	22	Zunciya Daya	✔	✔	✔	✔
Episode 2 (Sunday, 25 June 2017)	2	Wilson Odini	20	Just Give Me a Reason	–	✔	✔	✔
Episode 2 (Sunday, 25 June 2017)	3	Itunu Ogunyemi	23	Don't Let Me Down (The Chainsmokers song)	✔	–	✔	–
Episode 2 (Sunday, 25 June 2017)	4	Ogechi Ihenacho	25	Serious love	–	✔	✔	✔
Episode 2 (Sunday, 25 June 2017)	5	Annie Cedric	25	So beautiful	✔	–	–	–
Episode 2 (Sunday, 25 June 2017)	6	Chris Rio	21	Love don't lie	–	✔	–	–
Episode 2 (Sunday, 25 June 2017)	7	Paulyn Bob	24	Sorry (Justin Bieber song)	–	–	✔	–
Episode 2 (Sunday, 25 June 2017)	8	Kendri Ologidi	25	What a Girl Wants (Christina Aguilera song)	✔	✔	✔	✔
Episode 3 (Sunday, 2 July 2017)	1	Joy Ebiem	26	One Naira	✔	✔	✔	–
Episode 3 (Sunday, 2 July 2017)	2	Blessed Eke	24	Folashade	–	✔	–	✔
Episode 3 (Sunday, 2 July 2017)	3	Godwin Bada	25	The Lazy Song	–	–	–	✔
Episode 3 (Sunday, 2 July 2017)	4	Emmanuel Okafor	28	Step in the Name of Love	✔	–	–	–
Episode 3 (Sunday, 2 July 2017)	5	Obichi Marshall	24	Battlefield (song)	–	–	✔	✔
Episode 3 (Sunday, 2 July 2017)	6	Tama Nisa	25	From This Moment On (Shania Twain song)	✔	–	–	–
Episode 3 (Sunday, 2 July 2017)	7	Torisheju Ogbe	28	Wake Me Up (Avicii song)	–	✔	–	–
Episode 3 (Sunday, 2 July 2017)	8	Arewa Comfort	26	Let Me Love You (Until You Learn to Love Yourself)	✔	✔	✔	✔
Episode 4 (Sunday, 9 July 2017)	1	Sandra Osamor	25	National Anthem	✔	✔	✔	✔
Episode 4 (Sunday, 9 July 2017)	2	Kessy Mbonu	25	Jangilora	✔	✔	–	–
Episode 4 (Sunday, 9 July 2017)	3	Blessing Issac	25	A Woman's Worth	✔	–	–	–
Episode 4 (Sunday, 9 July 2017)	4	Shapera Makepeace	30	Bad Romance	✔	–	✔	✔
Episode 4 (Sunday, 9 July 2017)	5	Glory Amanyi	26	Irreplaceable	–	–	✔	–
Episode 4 (Sunday, 9 July 2017)	6	Olawaol Olusi	22	Pillowtalk (song)	✔	✔	–	–
Episode 4 (Sunday, 9 July 2017)	7	Nwando Okoli	27	Don't Take It Personal (Just One of Dem Days)	–	–	–	✔
Episode 4 (Sunday, 9 July 2017)	8	Victor Thompson	28	I Knew You Were Trouble	–	–	–	✔
Episode 5 (Sunday, 16 July 2017)	1	Ebube Obioma	24	Too Close (Alex Clare song)	✔	–	✔	✔
Episode 5 (Sunday, 16 July 2017)	2	Efezino Akpo	25	I'm with you	–	✔	✔	–
Episode 5 (Sunday, 16 July 2017)	3	Chuks Aniobonam	34	Shape of My Heart (Backstreet Boys song)	✔	✔	✔	✔
Episode 5 (Sunday, 16 July 2017)	4	Favour Johnson	25	Kissing by Yemi	–	✔	–	–
Episode 5 (Sunday, 16 July 2017)	5	Omueijevoke Ofiekpene	29	The Vow by Timi	✔	–	–	–
Episode 5 (Sunday, 16 July 2017)	6	Grace Udoh	29	Be Without You	–	–	–	✔
Episode 5 (Sunday, 16 July 2017)	7	Yimika Akinda	22	Ordinary (Cobahams)	✔	✔	–	–
Episode 5 (Sunday, 16 July 2017)	8	Chukwuemeka Chike	25	Sugar (Maroon 5 song)	✔	✔	–	–
Episode 6 (Sunday, 23 July 2017)	1	Gerald Agwunobi	23	Some nights	✔	✔	–	✔
Episode 6 (Sunday, 23 July 2017)	2	Amarachi Ugoeke	18	Wide Awake (Katy Perry song)	–	✔	✔	–
Episode 6 (Sunday, 23 July 2017)	3	Kelvin Audu	22	Take a Bow (Rihanna song)	✔	✔	✔	✔
Episode 6 (Sunday, 23 July 2017)	4	Happiness Osassumwen	21	Where Have You Been	✔	–	–	✔
Episode 6 (Sunday, 23 July 2017)	5	Bunmin Oshin	21	Only Girl (In the World)	–	✔	–	–
Episode 6 (Sunday, 23 July 2017)	6	Daniel James	27	Here and Now (Luther Vandross song)	✔	Team full	✔	–
Episode 6 (Sunday, 23 July 2017)	7	Tara & Bella	24	Heartbreak Hotel (Whitney Houston song)	–	Team full	–	✔
Episode 6 (Sunday, 23 July 2017)	8	Eserophe "EseQliC" Urinrin Okoro	27	Big Girls Don't Cry (Fergie song)	✔	Team full	✔	–
Episode 6 (Sunday, 23 July 2017)	9	Aloma Isaac Junior	25	Okay	Team full	Team full	Team full	✔

=== Battles ===
The battles began on 30 July 2017. The coaches can steal 2 losing artists from other coaches and proceed to live shows. At the end of battles, only 8 artists will remain on each team, 6 will be from battles that were won, and 2 from steals. A total of 32 advancing to live shows and 17 eliminated.

Battles color key
Artist won the Battle and advanced to the live shows
Artist lost the Battle, but was stolen by another coach, and, advanced to the live shows
Artist lost the Battle and was eliminated

Battles results
Episode	Coach	Order	Winner	Song	Loser	'Steal'/'Save' result			
Episode	Coach	Order	Winner	Song	Loser	Patoranking	Yemi	Waje	Timi
Episode 7 (Sunday, 30 July)	Yemi	1	Ifeoma	I'm Every Woman	Olla	—	N/A	—	—
Episode 7 (Sunday, 30 July)	Timi	2	Idyl	Love Me Now (John Legend song)	Happiness	—	—	—	N/A
Episode 7 (Sunday, 30 July)	Waje	3	Efezino	Awe	Daniel	✔	—	N/A	—
Episode 7 (Sunday, 30 July)	Patoranking	4	KessyDriz	Na gode	Favour	N/A	—	✔	—
Episode 7 (Sunday, 30 July)	Yemi	5	Oge	Firework (song)	Tori	—	N/A	—	—
Episode 7 (Sunday, 30 July)	Timi	6	Jahtell	The woman I love	Gee6ixx	—	—	—	N/A
Episode 8 (Sunday, 6 August)	Waje	1	Obichi	Romantic	Zicsaloma	—	—	N/A	—
Episode 8 (Sunday, 6 August)	Patoranking	2	Annie C	Beneath Your Beautiful	Tama Nisa	N/A	—	—	—
Episode 8 (Sunday, 6 August)	Yemi	3	Majeeka	Toh Bad	Wolei	—	N/A	—	✔
Episode 8 (Sunday, 6 August)	Timi	4	Bada	Signed, Sealed, Delivered I'm Yours	Blessed	—	—	—	N/A
Episode 8 (Sunday, 6 August)	Patoranking	5	Hightee	No Air	Blessing	N/A	—	—	—
Episode 8 (Sunday, 6 August)	Waje	6	Glowrie	Hurt You	Wilson	—	✔	N/A	—
Episode 9 (Sunday, 13 August)	Patoranking	1	Afolayan	Drag Me Down	Syemca	N/A	✔	✔	✔
Episode 9 (Sunday, 13 August)	Timi	2	Kendris	If love is a crime	Nwando	—	steal used	—	N/A
Episode 9 (Sunday, 13 August)	Waje	3	Wow	Jealous (Labrinth song)	Paulyn	—	steal used	N/A	—
Episode 9 (Sunday, 13 August)	Yemi	4	Bunmi	Aye Adaba	Yimika	✔	steal used	—	—
Episode 9 (Sunday, 13 August)	Patoranking	5	Ebube	Suit & Tie	Grey	N/A	steal used	—	—
Episode 9 (Sunday, 13 August)	Timi	6	Precious	When a Man Loves a Woman	Grace	steal used	steal used	—	N/A
Episode 10 (Sunday, 20 August)	Waje	1	Shapera	What Do You Want from Me (Adam Lambert song)	Zorah	steal used	steal used	N/A	—
Episode 10 (Sunday, 20 August)	Yemi	2	Chris Rio	More Than Words (Westlife song)	J'Dess	✔	N/A	✔	✔
Episode 10 (Sunday, 20 August)	Patoranking	3	Voke	Wanted	EseQliC	N/A	Team full	steal used	—
Episode 10 (Sunday, 20 August)	Waje	4	Arewa	What I Did for Love (David Guetta song)	Amarachi	Team full	Team full	N/A	✔
Episode 10 (Sunday, 20 August)	Timi	5	Victor	Ain't No Mountain High Enough	Tara & Bella and Sandra	Team full	Team full	Team full	N/A

=== Live Shows ===
The Live Shows began on 27 August 2017. All the 32 artists who advanced from the battles performed in the live shows for a place in the semifinals. This was divided into two episodes where 4 artists per team would perform in each episode. Two artists per team advanced from each episode, one as the coaches' vote and the other from public votes. A total of 8 artists advanced to the semifinals. All the 8 artists performed in the semifinal rounds for the public votes. Only 4 artists went through to the live finals. Idyl from Team Timi was announced as the winner of the second series of The Voice Nigeria and Ebube from Team Patoranking as runner-up.

Elimination Chart
Artist	Semifinals	Finale
Idyl	Safe	Winner
Ebube	Safe	Runner-up
Syemca	Safe	Third Place
Wow	Safe	Fourth Place
Chris Rio	Eliminated	
Yimika	Eliminated	
J'Dess	Eliminated	
Jahtell	Eliminated	

== Season 3 (2021) ==
After 3 years away, The Voice Nigeria is back with Season Three. Organisers have announced that the singing competition is open for online auditions - *25 August – 19 September 2020* and is expected to attract and help Nigerian musical talents. The Coaches for the Season 3 includes first-time coaches Darey, and Falz, as well as returning coaches Waje and Yemi Alade. The programme will be hosted by Nancy Isime, co-hosted by Toke Makinwa during the blind auditions and Stephanie Coker hosting the Red Room from the Live Shows. The show promises to take an interesting twist this season with many virtual engagements with fans, talents and the general public The winner of this edition is Esther Benyeogo

=== Teams ===
Teams color key
Winner
Top 3
Fourth place
Top 6
Top 8
Top 12
Stolen in the Knockout rounds
Eliminated in the Knockout rounds
Eliminated in the Battles

Coaches	Top 24 artists			
Falz				
Falz	Naomi Mac	Dapo Zacchaeus	Tamara Ebelike	Peace Amaefula
Falz	~~Kpee Okoro~~	Nneka Ngwe	Okemdiya Chimomez	
Waje				
Waje	Eazzie	Nuel Ayo	Inioluwa	Ayomikum
Waje	~~Anu Okinlagun~~	Teslim	Ifunanya Nwangene	
Yemi Alade				
Yemi Alade	Kitay Okiemute	Anu Okinlagun	Toseen Emehinola	Vanilla Chinagoro
Yemi Alade	Charles Loven	Oluwabukola Ogunbodede	Tim Ayo	
Darey				
Darey	Esther Benyeago	Kpee Okoro	Jeremiah Ranti	Rachel Ogondi
Darey	~~Dapo Zacchaeus~~	~~Ayomikum~~	Blessing Ucheonye	
Note: Italicized names are stolen artists (names struck through within former teams).

=== Blind Auditions ===
Blind auditions color key
✔	Coach pressed "I WANT YOU" button
	Artist elected a coach's team
	Artist defaulted to a coach's team
	Artist was eliminated with no coach pressing their button

Blind auditions results
Episode	Order	Artist	Age	Hometown	Song	Coach's and artist's choices			
Episode	Order	Artist	Age	Hometown	Song	Falz	Waje	Yemi	Darey
Episode 1 (Saturday, 27 March 2021)	1	Rachel Ogondi	31	Bayelsa State	Ijoba Orun	✔	✔	✔	✔
Episode 1 (Saturday, 27 March 2021)	2	Oluwabukola Ogunbodede	28		Girl on Fire (song)	✔	✔	✔	–
Episode 1 (Saturday, 27 March 2021)	3	Shallom Mathew	23	Benue	Ego	–	–	–	–
Episode 1 (Saturday, 27 March 2021)	4	Oluwatosin	25	Ondo State	What Is Love (V. Bozeman song)	–	–	✔	✔
Episode 1 (Saturday, 27 March 2021)	5	Opko Eyo	22	Cross River State	When I Was Your Man	–	–	–	–
Episode 1 (Saturday, 27 March 2021)	6	Peace Amaefula	20	Abia State	Try Me	✔	✔	–	–
Episode 2 (Saturday, 3 April 2021)
Episode 2 (Saturday, 3 April 2021)	1	Nuel Ayo	21	Kogi State	Fix You	✔	✔	✔	✔
Episode 2 (Saturday, 3 April 2021)	2	Tim Ayo	23	Kogi State	Sade	–	–	✔	–
Episode 2 (Saturday, 3 April 2021)	3	Amarachi Ben Ikenador	23	Imo State	Big Girls Don't Cry (Fergie song)	–	–	–	–
Episode 2 (Saturday, 3 April 2021)	4	Okemdiya Chimomez	28	Abia State	Memories (Maroon 5 song)	✔	✔	–	–
Episode 2 (Saturday, 3 April 2021)	5	Adedotun Adeleye	25	Osun State	Forever Young	–	–	–	–
Episode 2 (Saturday, 3 April 2021)	6	Vanilla Chinagoro	32	Imo State	Freedom (Beyoncé song)	✔	✔	✔	–
Episode 3 (Saturday, 10 April 2021)	1	Elizabeth Osesiameh	24	Edo State	Love on the Brain	✔	✔	–	–
Episode 3 (Saturday, 10 April 2021)	2	Clifford Enobun	27	Oyo State	It's a Man's Man's Man's World	–	–	–	–
Episode 3 (Saturday, 10 April 2021)	3	Inioluwa Adeyemi	21	Kwara State	Photograph (Ed Sheeran song)	✔	✔	–	–
Episode 3 (Saturday, 10 April 2021)	4	Pamela Scott	22		Hero (Mariah Carey song)	–	–	–	–
Episode 3 (Saturday, 10 April 2021)	5	Avwerosua Teslim	30	Delta State	Redemption Song	✔	✔	–	–
Episode 3 (Saturday, 10 April 2021)	6	Gifty Ighiwiyisi	20	Edo State	Pretty Hurts	–	–	–	–
Episode 3 (Saturday, 10 April 2021)	7	Esther Benyeago	23	Delta State	Rise Up (Andra Day song)	✔	✔	–	✔
Episode 4 (Saturday, 17 April 2021)
Episode 4 (Saturday, 17 April 2021)	1	Charles Loven		Osun State	"Need you" fireboy	✔	✔	✔	–
Episode 4 (Saturday, 17 April 2021)	2	Dick Sarah	22	Delta State	"Power rangers" Teni	–	–	–	–
Episode 4 (Saturday, 17 April 2021)	3	Jeremiah Ranti	26	Ondo state	I'm Not the Only One	–	–	–	✔
Episode 4 (Saturday, 17 April 2021)	4	Ayiebafere	27	Bayelsa State	listen	–	–	–	–
Episode 4 (Saturday, 17 April 2021)	5	Ifunanya Nwangene	21	Enugu state	Take a Bow (Rihanna song)	–	✔	✔	–
Episode 4 (Saturday, 17 April 2021)	6	Ayomikun	20	Ondo State	'Pray for you" Nosa	✔	✔	✔	✔
Episode 5 (Saturday, 24 April 2021)
Episode 5 (Saturday, 24 April 2021)	1	Kpee Okoro	20		Safa - Kizz Daniel	✔	✔	–	–
Episode 5 (Saturday, 24 April 2021)	2	Blessing Ucheonye	25	Delta State	Un-Break My Heart	–	–	–	✔
Episode 5 (Saturday, 24 April 2021)	3	Paul Mogbolu	28	Delta State	Jealous (Labrinth song)	–	–	–	–
Episode 5 (Saturday, 24 April 2021)	4	Alade Kolade	26	Ekiti State	You Are the Reason (Calum Scott song)	–	–	–	–
Episode 5 (Saturday, 24 April 2021)	5	Tamara Ebelike		Bayelsa State	I Have Nothing	✔	–	–	–
Episode 5 (Saturday, 24 April 2021)	6	Ifeoma	22	Delta State	Issues (Julia Michaels song)	–	–	–	–
Episode 5 (Saturday, 24 April 2021)	7	Naomi Mac	29	Delta State	(Everything I Do) I Do It for You	✔	✔	✔	–
Episode 6 (Saturday, 1 May 2021)
Episode 6 (Saturday, 1 May 2021)	1	Dapo Zacchaeus	28	Lagos State	Let Me Love You (Mario song)	✔	✔	✔	✔
Episode 6 (Saturday, 1 May 2021)	2	Adeola Oladipupo	22	Oyo State	Case - Teni	–	–	–	Team Full
Episode 6 (Saturday, 1 May 2021)	3	Anu Okinlagun	29	Lagos State	Wrecking Ball (Miley Cyrus song)	✔	✔	✔	Team Full
Episode 6 (Saturday, 1 May 2021)	4	Nneka Ngwe	27	Ebonyi State	From This Moment On (Shania Twain song)	✔	Team Full	✔	Team Full
Episode 6 (Saturday, 1 May 2021)	5	Cabrini Nwankwo	23	Anambra State	Read All About It, Pt. III	Team Full	Team Full	–	Team Full
Episode 6 (Saturday, 1 May 2021)	6	Kitay Okiemute	25	Delta State	Away - Oxlade	Team Full	Team Full	✔	Team Full

=== Knockouts ===
Knockouts began on 9 May 2021. 6 artists per team compete against each other for a spot in the battle rounds. One can either advance to the battles by a safe from their coach or steal from another coach.

Results color key
Artist won the knockout and advanced to battles.
Artist lost the knockout and was eliminated
Artist lost the Knockout but was stolen by another coach and advanced to battles

Knockouts results per team
Episodes	Coaches	Order	Artist	Song	Result
Episode 7 (Saturday, 8 May 2021)	Yemi Alade	1	Toeseen	What Now - Rihanna)	Advanced
Episode 7 (Saturday, 8 May 2021)	Yemi Alade	2	Loven	Away - Wande Coal	Eliminated
Episode 7 (Saturday, 8 May 2021)	Yemi Alade	3	Vanilla	Titanium - (Sia)	Advanced
Episode 7 (Saturday, 8 May 2021)	Yemi Alade	4	Ewalouwa	Dangerous Woman - Ariana Grande)	Eliminated
Episode 7 (Saturday, 8 May 2021)	Yemi Alade	5	Tim Ayo	Live Riddim - Rotimi	Eliminated
Episode 7 (Saturday, 8 May 2021)	Yemi Alade	6	Kitay	Laye - Kizz Daniel	Advanced
Episode 8 (Saturday, 15 May 2021)	Falz	1	Neky	Killing me Softly - Fugees	Eliminated
Episode 8 (Saturday, 15 May 2021)	Falz	2	Naomi Mac	I Look to You (Whitney)	Advanced
Episode 8 (Saturday, 15 May 2021)	Falz	3	Okemdiya	Something Different - Adekunle Gold	Eliminated
Episode 8 (Saturday, 15 May 2021)	Falz	4	KPee	Risky - Davido	Steal(Darey)
Episode 8 (Saturday, 15 May 2021)	Falz	5	Peace	Wanted - Tiwa Savage	Advanced
Episode 8 (Saturday, 15 May 2021)	Falz	6	Tamara	Bleeding Love - Leona Lewis	Advanced
Episode 9 (Saturday, 22 May 2021)	Waje	1	Teslim	Run Away - Styl-Plus	Eliminated
Episode 9 (Saturday, 22 May 2021)	Waje	2	Ifunanya	Right Away - Seyi Shay	Eliminated
Episode 9 (Saturday, 22 May 2021)	Waje	3	Nuel Ayo	When a Woman Loves	Advanced
Episode 9 (Saturday, 22 May 2021)	Waje	4	Eazzie	"California King Bed"	Advanced
Episode 9 (Saturday, 22 May 2021)	Waje	5	Inioluwa	Fire on the mountain - Asa	Advanced
Episode 9 (Saturday, 22 May 2021)	Waje	6	Anu	God Is a Woman - Ariana Grande	Steal(Yemi)
Episode 10 (Saturday, 29 May 2021)	Darey	1	Jeremiah	Believe - Ric Hassani	Adcanced
Episode 10 (Saturday, 29 May 2021)	Darey	2	Blescene	Stick with you - Pussy cat dolls	Eliminated
Episode 10 (Saturday, 29 May 2021)	Darey	3	Rachel	Smash Into You - Beyonce	Advanced
Episode 10 (Saturday, 29 May 2021)	Darey	4	Ayomikum	Just the Way You Are (Bruno Mars song)	Steal(Waje)
Episode 10 (Saturday, 29 May 2021)	Darey	5	Dapo	I Wanna Know (Joe song)	Steal(Falz)
Episode 10 (Saturday, 29 May 2021)	Darey	6	Esther	Flying without win	Advanced

=== Battles ===
The Battles began on 5 June 2021 and concluded on 12 June 2021. In this round, each coach pairs 2 artists against each other to battle out. At the end of the battle, a coach chooses one artist in each battle to advance to the live shows. Later, the public then chooses one of the losing artists per team to advance.

Battles color key
Artist won the Battle and advanced to the Live shows.
Artist lost the Battle, but was chosen by the public and advanced to Live shows.
Artist lost the Battle and was eliminated.

Battles results
Episode	Coach	Order	Winner	Song	Loser
Episode 11 (Saturday, 5 June)
Episode 11 (Saturday, 5 June)	Falz	1	Dapo	Already - (Beyonce)	Peace
Episode 11 (Saturday, 5 June)	waje	2	Eazzie	Perfect - Ed (Sheeran)	Nuel Ayo
Episode 11 (Saturday, 5 June)	Waje	3	Inioluwa	Nobody - (Dj Neptune)	Ayomikum
Episode 11 (Saturday, 5 June)	Falz	4	Naomi Mac	Ladies and gentlemen - Rookado	Tamara
Episode 12 (Saturday, 12 June)	Yemi	1	Kitay	Uptown funk - (Bruno Mars)	Vanilla
Episode 12 (Saturday, 12 June)	Darey	2	Esther	Uyo Meyo - (Teni)	Jeremiah
Episode 12 (Saturday, 12 June)	Yemi	3	Anu	Stay - (Rihanna)	Toseen
Episode 12 (Saturday, 12 June)	Darey	4	Kpee	Oliver Twist - (D'banj song)	Rachel

=== Live Shows ===
The live shows started on 3 July 2021. A total of 12 artists performed in front of the coaches and a live audience for a spot in the next round. Only 2 artists per team advanced, one from judge's choice and the other from public votes. On the 2nd week of live shows, all 8 who advanced performed for a spot in the semifinals. A total of 6 from the top vote getters from the public advanced. During the 3rd week of live shows, the top 6 performed for a chance to be crowned the winner of the voice season 3.

Live shows color key
Artist was saved by public's vote
Artist was saved by his/her coach
Artist was eliminated

Live Show results
Episode	Coach	Order	Artist	Song	Result
Episode 15 (Saturday, 3 July 2021)	Waje	1	Eazzie	If you ask me - Omawumi	Waje's choice
Episode 15 (Saturday, 3 July 2021)	Waje	2	Inioluwa	Essence - Wizkid ft Tems	Eliminated
Episode 15 (Saturday, 3 July 2021)	Waje	3	Nuel Ayo	Diamonds - Rihanna	Public's vote
Episode 15 (Saturday, 3 July 2021)	Darey	4	Esther	In the music - Omawumi	Darey's choice
Episode 15 (Saturday, 3 July 2021)	Darey	5	Jeremiah	Billionaire - Teni	Eliminated
Episode 15 (Saturday, 3 July 2021)	Darey	6	Kpee	Roju - Chike	Public's vote
Episode 15 (Saturday, 3 July 2021)	Yemi	7	Toseen	The Climb Miles Cyrus	Eliminated
Episode 15 (Saturday, 3 July 2021)	Yemi	8	Kitay	Dance with My Father - Luther Vandross	Yemi's choice
Episode 15 (Saturday, 3 July 2021)	Yemi	9	Anu	Feeling Good - Nina Simone	Public's vote
Episode 15 (Saturday, 3 July 2021)	Falz	10	Tamara	Halo - Beyoncé	Eliminated
Episode 15 (Saturday, 3 July 2021)	Falz	11	Dapo	Ordinary People - (John Legend )	Public's vote
Episode 15 (Saturday, 3 July 2021)	Falz	12	Naomi Mac	Glory - Common and John Legend	Falz's choice
Episode 16 (Saturday, 10 July 2021)	Falz	1	Naomi Mac	I Will Always Love - Whitney Houston	Public's vote
Episode 16 (Saturday, 10 July 2021)	Falz	2	Dapo	Fall in love - D'banj	Public's vote
Episode 16 (Saturday, 10 July 2021)	Yemi	3	Kitay	Ada Ada - Flavour	Public's vote
Episode 16 (Saturday, 10 July 2021)	Yemi	4	Anu	This Is Me (The Greatest Showman song)	Eliminated
Episode 16 (Saturday, 10 July 2021)	Waje	5	Eazzie	I Want to Know What Love Is	Public's vote
Episode 16 (Saturday, 10 July 2021)	Waje	6	Nuel Ayo	Eye Adaba - Asa	Eliminated
Episode 16 (Saturday, 10 July 2021)	Darey	7	Esther	Never enough - greatest showman	Public's vote
Episode 16 (Saturday, 10 July 2021)	Darey	8	Kpee	Lady - Rema	Public's vote
Episode 17 (Saturday, 17 July 2021)	Darey	1	Esther	Love On Top - Beyoncé	
Episode 17 (Saturday, 17 July 2021)	Falz	2	Dapo	When a Man Loves a Woman - Michael Bolton	
Episode 17 (Saturday, 17 July 2021)	Yemi	3	Kitay	Sexual Healing - Marvin Gaye	
Episode 17 (Saturday, 17 July 2021)	Falz	4	Naomi Mac	Vulindela - Brenda Fassie	
Episode 17 (Saturday, 17 July 2021)	Darey	5	Kpee	Vibration - Fireboy	
Episode 17 (Saturday, 17 July 2021)	Waje	6	Eazzie	And I Am Telling You - Jennifer Hudson	

=== Finale ===
The finale aired on 24 July from 8.30pm. The artists performed duets in the 1st round after which the top 4 were revealed. The top 4 performed solo performances thereafter and the winner of the voice was crowned at the end of the show.

Battles color key
Top 4

Duets(round one)
Episode	Coach	Order	Artist	Song	Result
Episode 18 (Saturday, 24 July 2021)	Falz	1	Naomi Mac & Dapo	A Million Dreams - Greatest Showman	Naomi Mac
Episode 18 (Saturday, 24 July 2021)	Darey	2	Esther & Kpee	Duduke - Simi	Esther & Kpee
Episode 18 (Saturday, 24 July 2021)	Yemi & Waje	3	Kitay & Eazzie	For you - Teni ft Davido	Eazzie

Battles color key
Top 3
Artist was eliminated

Solos(round two)
Episode	Coach	Order	Artist	Song	Result
Episode 18 (Saturday, 24 July 2021)	Falz	1	Naomi Mac	Excess Love - Mercy Chinwo	Eliminated
Episode 18 (Saturday, 24 July 2021)	Darey	2	Kpee	Emergency - D'banj	Top 3
Episode 18 (Saturday, 24 July 2021)	Waje	3	Eazzie	We Are Here - Alicia Keys	Top 3
Episode 18 (Saturday, 24 July 2021)	Darey	4	Esther	Hello - Adele	Top 3

Solos(round three)
Episode	Coach	Order	Artist	Song	Result
Episode 18 (Saturday, 24 July 2021)
Episode 18 (Saturday, 24 July 2021)	Darey	1	Esther	You Raise Me Up	Winner
Episode 18 (Saturday, 24 July 2021)	Waje	2	Eazzie	Writing's on the Wall - Sam Smith	Top 3
Episode 18 (Saturday, 24 July 2021)	Darey	3	Kpee	Champion - fireboy	Top 3

== Awards and nominations ==
Year	Award	Category	Result	Ref
2021	Net Honours	Most Popular Event	Nominated	

== See also ==
- Idols
- Nigeria's Got Talent
- Nigerian Idol
- Project Fame
