= Naomi Mac =

Nigerian singer and Songwriter

- Born: Naomi Oyintare Mac Ebiama
- Origin: Bayelsa, Nigeria
- Genres: Contemporary Gospel
- Occupations: Singer songwriter
- Instrument: Vocal
- Years active: 2011–present
- Spouse: Frank Paladini

Naomi Oyintare Mac Ebiama popularly known as Naomi Mac, is a Nigerian singer and songwriter. She has appeared on Nigerian Idol where she was the second runner up and also appeared on The Voice Nigeria. She later released an album called The Pathfinder and a single titled I Believe.

== Early life and background ==
Mac is a native of Bayelsa State, Nigeria but is based in Lagos, Nigeria. She married Francesco Paladini in 2017 after her appearance on the reality competition show Nigerian Idol and has two daughters.

== Career ==
In 2011, Naomi was the first runner up of the popular TV reality show in Nigeria called the Nigerian Idol.

In 2021, Naomi Mac was among the finalists of The Voice Nigeria.

== Discography ==
=== Singles ===
- My Heart feat Adekunle Gold (2015)
- Ori Mi feat Pheelz (2016)
- Mujo (2016)
- Together Forever (2017)
- I Am (2020)
- Worship Medley (2022)
- I Believe (2023)
- Melody (2023)

=== Albums ===
- The Pathfinder (2021)
