= Nara Unateze =

Nara Unateze (originally eraranwata) is a town in the Nkanu East Local Government Area of Enugu State Nigeria. It belongs to the Nkanu clan of Igbo land and speaks the Nkanu dialect of Igbo language. It is popularly known as Obodo Iwewe (the town that never gets angry).

Politically, Nara consists of the electoral wards Nara Ward I and ward II. Each ward elects a Councillor, a local parliamentarian who represents it at the Nkanu East Local Government legislative Council at the Council Headquarters at Amagunze.

Nara has four autonomous communities, Nara, Amagu/Amofia, Umuawalagu and Isiogbo Nara. Each community is headed by a Traditional Rulers usually called "Igwe".

Nara is bordered by Ugbawka, Ihuokpara, Ezza, Nkerefi, Mburubu and Isu/Ohaozara.

== Town ==
The town contains eight communities, Umueze, Umuawalagu, Amagu, Amofia, Umuiba, Isiogbo, Umuawaragu, and Umuokparangene.

== Boundaries ==
The town is bordered by Ugbawka, Nkerefi, Ihuokpara, Mburubu, and Isu Ohaozara.

== Villages ==
The major villages are Amofia, Umueze, Umuiba, Amagu, Umunze, Umuokparangene, Umuawaragu

== Features ==
Nara Unataeze has predominantly two major rivers, the Esu river and the Ojorowo River, with confluence at Obeagu Umueze.

This town has two major markets, Nkwo and Orie Nara, whose market days are only four days apart from each other. On each market day large quantities of goods and commodities which Naraunateze produces are displayed. It is said that the farm produce of garri and palm oil bought in the town serves a quarter of the state's populace.

The major delicacy of the Unataeze people is Ofe-awa (awa-soup) which is prepared with the awa leaf together with the egusi seeds preferably.

Nara Unateze as community is nicknamed "Obodo Iwe-ewe" which translates "a town that never gets angry".

The palace of former Igwe Nathan Ogbu is a tourist attraction.

== Rulership ==
Nara Unataeze became popular under the reign of the king Igwe Nathan Anyi Ogbu, Odenigbo 1 of Nara-unataeze, who was influential throughout his reign of over four decades. Several years after he died, his son Igwe Ifeanyi Ogbu (Ivurube), Odenigbo II of Nara unateze became king. The first paramount ruler before the reign of Igwe Nathan Ogbu was Chife Edeani Ede from Obinagu village who took over from Chief Ogbuka Edeanyi from Agbariji village.

Three other autonomous communities have since been created out of the original Nara Kingdom with each community headed by a traditional ruler: Isiogbo Nara, whose ruler, Igwe S.A. Arinze died; Umuawalagu with Igwe (Ezeudo) Abel O. Nwobodo (JP), KJWI, MFR as its traditional ruler; and Amofia/Amagu. The traditional ruler of Amofia/Amagu was Igwe Okoro Egbo, who died leaving no immediate successor.

== See also ==
- Populated places in Enugu State
