= Aloma Isaac Junior =

Nigerian comedian

- Born: November 7, 1991 (age 34); Kaduna State, Nigeria
- Education: Abia State University
- Occupations: Comedian, actor and singer
- Years active: 2017–present

Aloma Isaac Junior (born November 7, 1991) known by his stage name Zicsaloma is a Nigerian, comic skit maker, content creator, actor and singer. He rose to prominence for comedic videos he posts to Instagram, and TikTok.

== Early life and education ==
Zicsaloma was born in Kaduna State which is located in the Northern region of Nigeria, and originally hails from Abia State in the southeastern region of Nigeria. He attended the Sacred Heart Primary School for his primary education and Airforce Secondary School for his secondary education. He studied English and Literary Studies at the Abia State University.

== Career ==
Prior to becoming a comedian, Zicsaloma contested in The Voice Nigeria season 2 competition and got eliminated in the semi-finals. After bagging his degree, he embarked on full time comedy in 2017, and became an internet sensation after his viral comic skit on TikTok.
