= Timi Dakolo =

Nigerian singer

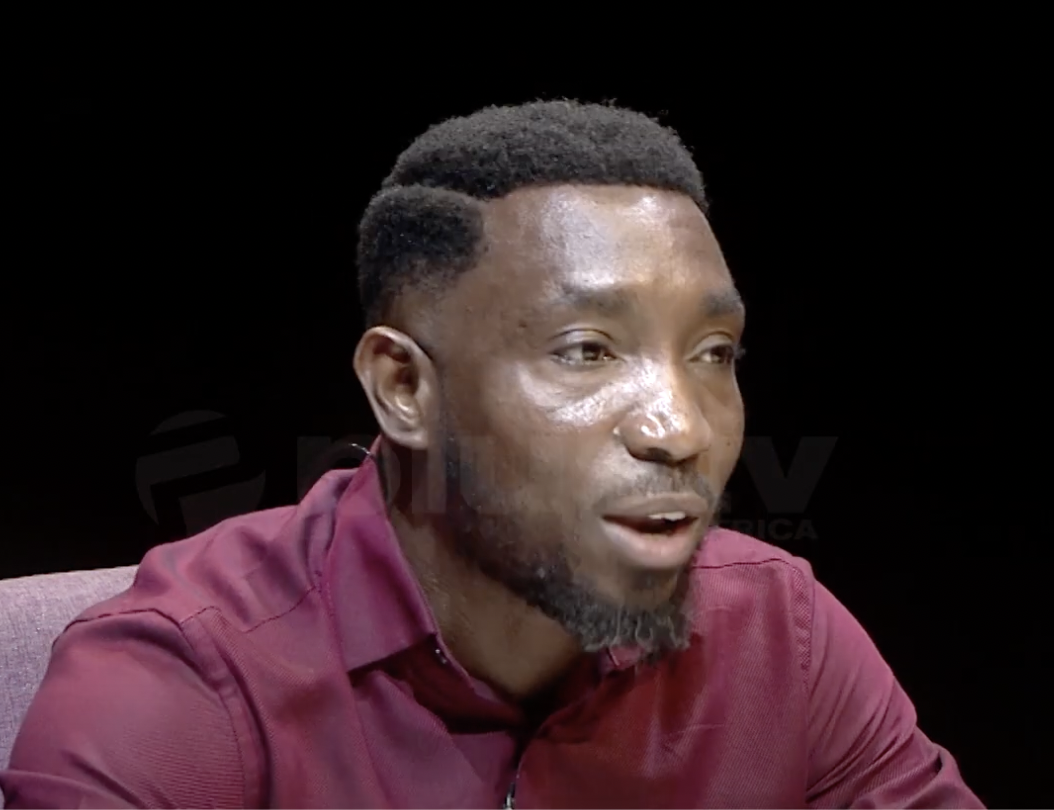

Background information
- Born: January 20, 1981 (age 45); Accra, Ghana
- Origin: Gbarantoru, Yenagoa Local Government Area, Bayelsa State, Nigeria
- Genre: Soul music
- Occupation: Singer
- Instrument: Vocals
- Years active: 2007–present
- Label: Virgin Records (UMG)
- Website: timidakolo.com

Timi Dakolo (born January 20, 1981) is a Nigerian singer, songwriter, and music producer. He emerged winner of the inaugural season of Idols West Africa in 2007. Accompanying his victory was a recording contract with Sony BMG, in addition to other prizes.

== Early life ==
Timi Dakolo was born in Accra, Ghana to a Nigerian father, Bayelsa-native David and a Ghanaian mother, Norah Kimmy Head, who died when Dakolo was thirteen years old. Although born in Ghana, Dakolo holds Nigerian citizenship and does not claim dual nationality. He was raised in Port Harcourt by his grandmother Ateni Dakolo and his aunt Susan Larry, and he credits his aunt as his early singing teacher.

Timi started singing in church at the age of twelve. In 2003, he joined the singing group Purple Love as a founding member. They dominated the Port Harcourt club circuit, but disbanded in 2005 as all its members had gained admission into the University of Port Harcourt. Around that same period, Timi won a local talent hunt contest G.E FACTO, which held in Port Harcourt.

== Career ==
Timi Dakolo began his music career singing in church choirs as a teenager in Port Harcourt, Nigeria. In 2003, he co-founded the group Purple Love, which gained regional popularity before disbanding in 2005 when Dakolo left to focus on his university education.

In 2007, Dakolo rose to national prominence after winning the inaugural season of Idols West Africa. His soulful performances throughout the competition earned him widespread acclaim and a recording contract with Sony BMG Africa.

In 2009, he released his debut single "Heaven Please," which introduced him to mainstream Nigerian audiences. In 2011, Dakolo released "There's a Cry" and "Great Nation," the latter becoming an anthem promoting national unity and hope in Nigeria.

That same year, Dakolo released his debut studio album Beautiful Noise, which featured tracks such as "Great Nation" and "Love Song." The album was praised for its emotive lyrical content and Dakolo’s powerful vocal delivery.

In 2014, Dakolo released "Iyawo Mi," which became a wedding anthem across Nigeria, showcasing his mastery of soulful R&B infused with African highlife influences. The following year, he released "Wish Me Well," which won Best Recording of the Year and Best Vocal Performance (Male) at The Headies 2015.

Between 2016 and 2018, Dakolo continued to release successful singles, including "The Vow" (2016), "Medicine" (2017), and "I Never Know Say" (2018), all of which explored themes of love and devotion.

In 2019, Dakolo signed a record deal with Virgin EMI Records. That same year, he released his second studio album, Merry Christmas, Darling, featuring international collaborations such as Emeli Sandé on the title track.

In 2020, Dakolo released "Take," featuring Nigerian rapper Olamide, blending soulful melodies with Afrobeat rhythms. In 2021, he released "Everything (Amen)," which received widespread airplay across West Africa and reinforced his influence in the region’s music industry.

Between 2022 and 2023, Dakolo continued to solidify his reputation as one of Nigeria’s leading soul singers. In 2023, he served as a coach on The Voice Nigeria, mentoring emerging vocal talents.

In 2024, Dakolo released his third studio album, The Chorus Leader, which showcased his growth as a vocalist and songwriter. The album blended soul, gospel, and Afrobeat influences and featured collaborations with artists such as Patoranking, Phyno, Falz, Black, Geez, and Ebuka. Critics praised the project for its rich vocal arrangements and socially conscious lyrics addressing faith, resilience, and African pride.

== Idols West Africa ==
In 2006, Dakolo auditioned for reality show Idols West Africa in Calabar, Cross River State of Nigeria. Timi Dakolo's songs of choice were Commissioned's More Than I and Lemar's Time to Grow. His vocals impressed the judges, and he was seen as a contender for the prize.

While in the competition, Timi Dakolo was never in the bottom 3. In the final three weeks of the competition it was revealed by the producers of the show that Timi had the highest number of votes each of those weeks.

During the competition, Timi's grandmother died, a week before the viewing of the Top 24 performances. This was a big emotional blow to him. At that time, he turned to his Christian faith for strength to pull through in the competition. Before going to Idols West Africa, Timi was a student of Communication Studies in the University of Port Harcourt.

== After Idol ==
After winning Idol West Africa in 2007, on January 1, 2008, Dakolo was shot and injured during an attack by militants at the Presidential Hotel in Port Harcourt. He sustained a minor wound and was discharged the same day.

Timi Dakolo released his first single comprising three songs in October 2009.

In 2011, he released the song "There's a Cry". The music video was filmed in Nigeria. He is currently signed with Lone Records/Now Muzik.

Timi Dakolo is one of the Judges on The Voice Nigeria.

Timi Dakolo released a Christmas album titled "Merry Christmas, Darling" featuring guest duets such as Emeli Sandé and Kenny G in November 2019.

== Personal life ==
Timi Dakolo married Busola Dakolo (née Amupitan) in 2012. They have three children.

== Discography ==
=== Albums ===
- 2011: "Beautiful Noise"
- 2019: "Merry Christmas, Darling “
- 2024: "The Chorus Leader"

=== Singles ===
- 2011: "There's a Cry"
- 2011: "Great Nation"
- 2014: "Iyawo Mi"
- 2015: "Wish Me Well"
- 2016: "The Vow"
- 2017: "Medicine"
- 2018: "I Never Know Say"
- 2019: "Merry Christmas Darling feat. Emeli Sande"
- 2020: "Take" Ft. Olamide
- 2021: "Everything (Amen)"

== Awards and nominations ==
- 2010: Hip Hop World Revelation of the Year – Nominated, during The Headies
- 2015: Best Recording of the Year- Wish Me Well
