= List of Nigerian gospel musicians =

This is a list of notable Nigerian gospel musicians arranged in alphabetical order.

- Ada Ehi
- Ayo Vincent
- Bidemi Olaoba
- Bola Are
- Chigozie Wisdom
- Chinyere Udoma
- Chioma Jesus
- Cobhams Asuquo
- Cornelius Adam Igbudu
- Dunni Olanrewaju
- Ebuka Songs
- Eben
- el Mafrex
- Emmanuel Iren
- Folabi Nuel
- Frank Edwards
- Funmi Aragbaye
- Gaise Baba
- Greatman Takit
- Jahdiel
- Jeremiah Gyang
- Joe Praize
- Joseph Adebayo Adelakun
- Joshua Mike-Bamiloye
- Judikay
- Kefee
- Kunle Ajayi
- Lara George
- Limoblaze
- Mairo Ese
- Mega 99
- Mercy Chinwo
- Mike Abdul
- Minister GUC
- Moses Bliss
- Nathaniel Bassey
- Neon Adejo
- Nikki Laoye
- Nimix
- Nosa
- Obiwon
- Onos Ariyo
- Onyeka Onwenu
- Osinachi Nwachukwu
- Ossy Brown
- Patty Obasi
- Samsong
- Sammie Okposo
- Sinach
- Snatcha
- Sola Allyson
- Sunmisola Agbebi
- Tim Godfrey
- Tomi Favored
- Tope Alabi
- TY Bello
- Victor Thompson
- Victoria Orenze
