= Dunni Olanrewaju =

Nigerian gospel singer (born 1960)

- Born: December 2, 1960 (age 65); Akinyele, Oyo State, Nigeria
- Other name: Opelope Anointing
- Citizenship: Nigerian
- Occupations: gospel singer; songwriter; evangelist
- Years active: 1998–present

Dunni Olanrewaju (December 2, 1960), popularly known as Opelope Anointing is a Nigerian gospel singer, songwriter and televangelist.

== Early life ==
Opelope Anointing was born on 2 December 1960 at Akinyele, a local government area in Oyo State, southwestern Nigeria into a Christian family of the late Isaiah and Deaconess Elizabeth Olaniyi.

== Education ==
Dunni began her early primary education in a village called Sannu before she later proceeded to Elekuro Secondary Modern School in Ibadan, but left to Ejigbo High School in Lagos State, where she finally dropped out to focus on gospel music.

== Career ==
Her debut album titled Adun-Igbeyawo was released in 1998 but she was famous for the album title Opelope Anointing, music she scripted and recorded in one day. She got her appellation, "Opelope Anointing" from this album. She launched her 20th album on October 26, 2014 and in attendance were renowned Nigerian gospel singers, Joseph Adebayo Adelakun, Tope Alabi, Bola Are and Funmi Aragbaye. In 2010, she established "Opelope Anointing Foundation (OPAF), a charity initiatives, Non-Governmental Organization.

== Personal life ==
In May 2013, her daughter Ibironke was married to Olawunmi and the wedding ceremony was held at Isolo in Lagos State. Guests in attendance were Bola Are, Funmi Aragbaye and Mega 99 who performed at the event centre.

== Discography ==
- Opelope Anointing (1998)

== See also ==
- List of Nigerian gospel musicians
