= Akhabue Ebalu Evans =

Nigerian producer and film editor

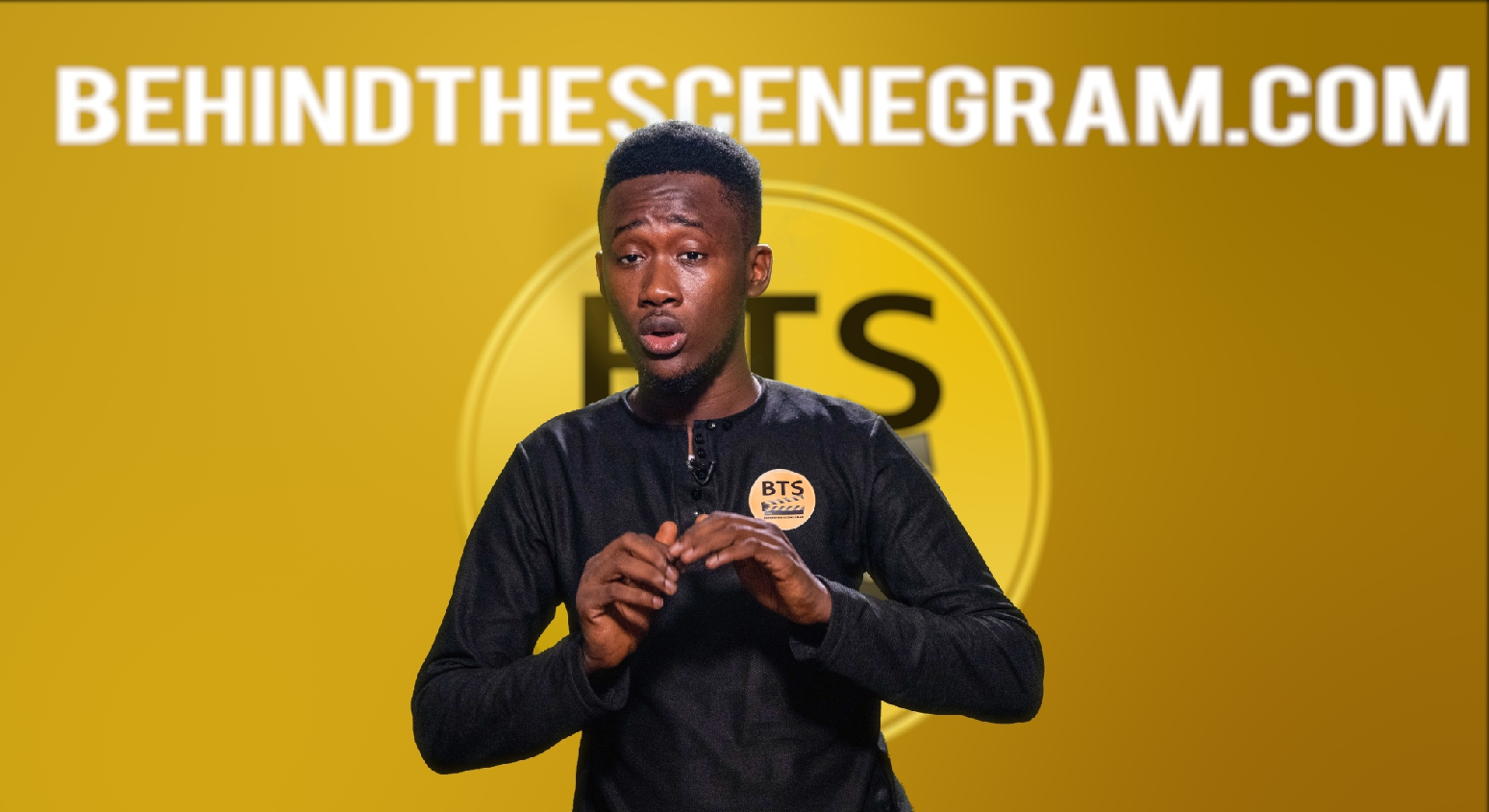
- Education: Lawyer by profession
- Occupations: Producer, cinematographer and video director
- Years active: 2002-present
- Spouse: Akhabue Blessing (m. 2018)

Akhabue Evans Ebalu, also known as Director En'man, is a Nigerian producer, cinematographer and film director. He works and directs for Carel Films, where he is also the chief executive officer of the company. He has directed music videos of Nathaniel Bassey, Dunsin Oyekan, Sinach, Ada Ehi, Rozey, Eben, Jahdiel, Testimony Jaga, Samsong, Victoria Orenze, Sunmisola Agbebi and the late Liberian gospel minister Moses Swarey.

== Biography ==
=== Early life ===
He started playing musical instruments at age five and became a music producer at age twelve, beginning with tape overdub before entering into filmmaking at age 20.

=== Career ===
Evans is a lawyer by profession and was called to the Nigerian bar at age 21. He has founded two companies; BTSGram (Behind The Scene Gram) and Music Video Market Place. BTS-Gram is a filmmaking blog that has collaborated with brands like; Feiyiu tech FY, Hollyland Technology, 3d lut creator, Teffest by Omotola Jalande-Ekeinde, Gvm LED, Insta360, Gudsenmoza, Zhiyun_tech, Filmcrux. In October 2022, he directed Tim Godfrey’s “FEARLESS CONCERT” which was held at Eko Convention Center, Lagos Nigeria. He’s so responsible for Yamaha’s high-level visual productions in Africa.

== Filmography ==
Year	Artist	Song	Directed
2014	Rozey	Kinging	Yes
2015	Sinach	I know who I am	Yes
2016	Ada Ehi	I Testify	Yes
2016	Ada Ehi	Only You	Yes
2016	Eben	Victory	Yes
2016	Jahdiel	This My Hands	Yes
2017	Jahdiel	Like You	Yes
2017	Testimony	Igara	Yes
2019	Samsong	E Dey Work	Yes
2019	Sinach	Omemma (Sinach live in concert 2019)	Yes
2020	Sinach	All Things are Ready	Yes
2020	Eben feat. Nathaniel Bassey	No one like you	Yes
2020	Moses Bliss	Too Faithful	Yes
2025	Luwi	Armament	Yes
2025	Nathaniel Bassey	O Dara	Yes
2025	Mercy Chinwo	From The Rising (LIVE)	Yes
2025	Sunmisola Agbebi	Tomorrow	Yes
2025	Nathaniel Bassey	Hallelujah Festival	Yes
2025	Judikay	Not Done	Yes
2025	Sunmisola Agbebi	Hallelujah	Yes
2025	Rotimikeys x Gaisebaba	Benefit	Yes
2025	Grace Oluwaloju x Theophilus Sunday	Power Of God	Yes
2025	Judikay	Have You Seen	Yes
2025	Mercy Chinwo feat. MOG Music	None Like You Lord	Yes
2025	Grace Oluwaloju, Kaestrings	The Glory (Live)	Yes
2025	Sunmisola Agbebi	WORSHIP MEDLEY Vol. 3	Yes
2025	Mercy Chinwo	Onyeoma	Yes
2025	Moses Bliss	Ebenezer	Yes
2025	Ebukasongs x Okopi Peterson	Whatever	Yes
2025	Nathaniel Bassey	Dancing Around Medley	Yes
2025	Moses Bliss	Thank You	Yes
2025	Bidemi Olaoba	Many Many Things	Yes
2025	Rotimikeys	Light	Yes
2025	Anthony Kani, Minister GUC	Never Again (Live)	Yes
2026	Dunsin Oyekan	Burn	Yes
2026	Tim Godfrey	Inifinity	Yes
2026	Aidee Ime feat. Dasola Akinbule	YHWH	Yes
2026	Moses Bliss	Unending Joy	Yes
2026	Tkeyz, Gaise Baba	Baba Modupe	Yes
2026	Chinyere Udoma	IF E NOR BE GOD	Yes
2026	Chinyere Udoma	Unbelievable Miracles	Yes
2026	Testimony JOE	SUDDENLY SUDDENLY	Yes
2026	Nathaniel Bassey	Jehovah	Yes
2026	Dunsin Oyekan feat. Pastor E.A Adeboye	AMEN	Yes
2026	Preye Odede feat. Prinx Emmanuel	Dey Pray	Yes
2026	Judikay	Riwa Otito	Yes
2026	Rhema Onuoha	I Love Your Name	Yes
2026	Dunsin Oyekan	New Wine	Yes
2026	Moses Bliss	The Mountain Experience	Yes
2026	Joan Kaboleri	You Reign	Yes
2026	ElSammy, Sinach	Mighty	Yes
2026	Dr Ugonma, Nathaniel Bassey	What a God	Yes
2026	Tim Godfrey, Fearless C., Nosa	We Raise A Sound	Yes
2026	Victoria Orenze	Room	Yes
2026	Mercy Chinwo	Okaka	Yes

== Awards ==
- SSMA (South-South Media Awards) 2014, Video Director of the Year (En’man – Kilq (Ileke) (Nominated & won it)
- Loveworld Awards- Nominated as Video Editor of the year in 2016 & 2017
- LMAM (Loveworld Music and Arts Ministry Awards) Category- Directing, Editing & motion graphics (2016-2019)
