= Funmi Aragbaye =

Nigerian gospel singer (born 1954)

- Born: July 5, 1954 (age 72); Ondo State, Nigeria Protectorate
- Other name: Veronica
- Citizenship: Nigerian
- Occupations: gospel singer; songwriter; evangelist
- Years active: 1983–present

Funmi Aragbaye (born July 5, 1954) is a Nigerian gospel singer, songwriter and televangelist.

== Early life ==
Funmi Aragbaye was born on July 5, 1954, in Ondo town, into a Christian family. She was trained at Ondo State's Civil Service training schools before she joined the Oyo State Civil Service, where she retired as Principal Administrative Officer in 1997. She started her musical career at Evangelical Church Winning All at Ilorin, the capital of Kwara State, Nigeria shortly after she obtained the West Africa School Certificate. Her debut album titled Olorun Igbala, along with Sioni Ilu Ayo were released in 1983. She celebrated her 60th birthday and 30th year in gospel music on July 5, 2014, in Lagos state. In attendance were veteran Nigerian gospel singers and artistes including chief Ebenezer Obey, Joseph Adebayo Adelakun, Dunni Olanrewaju, Kunle Ajayi, a saxophonist, and evangelist Bola Are, the two-term President of Gospel Musicians Association of Nigeria.

== Discography ==
- Olorun Igbala (1983)
- Sioni Ilu Ayo (1983)
- Ipin Rere (Good Portion)
- Glory of God (Ogo Oluwa)

== See also ==
- List of Nigerian gospel musicians
