= Efe (name) =

- Gender: Male
- Language: Turkish

Origin
- Meaning: 'Brave'

Other names
- Related names: Ege

Efe is a masculine Turkish given name meaning 'brave' or 'valiant'. It was historically used as a title for respected men in Western Anatolia. Sometimes the name also appears as a family name.

== People ==
=== Given name ===
- Efe Elmas (born 1989), Turkish writer and symbologist
- Efe Abogidi (born 2001), Nigerian basketball player
- Efe Afe (born 1967), Nigerian politician
- Efe Ajagba (born 1994), Nigerian boxer
- Efe Akman (born 2006), Turkish footballer
- Efe Ali (born 2003), Bulgarian footballer
- Efe Ambrose (born 1988), Nigerian footballer
- Efe Arda Koyuncu (born 2005), Turkish footballer
- Efe Aydan (born 1955), Turkish basketball player
- Efe Bayram (born 2002), Turkish volleyball player
- Efe Cakarel, Turkish entrepreneur
- Efe Echanomi (born 1986), footballer
- Efe Grace, Ghanaian singer and songwriter
- Efe Irele (born 1990), Nigerian actress
- Efe İnanç (born 1980), Turkish footballer
- Efe Jerry Obode (born 1989), Nigerian footballer
- Efe Korkut (born 2006), Turkish footballer
- Efe Mac Roc, Nigerian composer
- Efe Murad (born 1987), Turkish poet, translator, and historian
- Efe Obada (born 1992), British American football player
- Efe Paul Azino, Nigerian writer
- Efe Ronald Chesterfield, Nigerian writer
- Efe Sarıkaya (born 2005), Turkish footballer
- Efe Sodje (born 1972), footballer
- Efe Uwaifo (born 1995), British triple jumper
- Efe Özarslan (born 1990), Turkish footballer
- Efe Üstündağ (born 1977), Turkish tennis player

=== Middle name ===
- Ali Efe Yeğin (born 1993), Turkish motorcycle racer
- Gökçen Efe (1881–1919), Turkish folk hero
- Mert Efe Kılıçer (born 2004), Turkish artistic gymnast
- Poyraz Efe Yıldırım (born 2005), Turkish footballer

=== Surname ===
- Nevin Efe (1947–2026), Turkish actress
- Sam Loco Efe (1939–2011), Nigerian actor
