= Efe Mac Roc =

Nigerian Music Producer

- Born: Efeoghene Donald Idu; Lagos State, Nigeria
- Genres: Contemporary gospel; Pop; Rock; Soul
- Occupations: Record producer; Songwriter
- Instruments: Piano; Vocals
- Years active: 2012–present

Efeoghene Donald Idu popularly known as "Efe Mac Roc" or "Mac Roc" is a Nigerian composer and music producer. He officially started his music career in 2012 with the debut single "Hope".

== Early life ==
Efe Mac Roc was born in Lagos State, Nigeria as the last of two children but originally hails from Ughelli North, Delta State. Mac Roc later moved to Yola, Adamawa State where he completed his primary school education. After his secondary education, he proceeded to Benson Idahosa University, Edo State where he acquired his Bachelor's Degree in Computer Science.

== Career ==
Mac Roc started his music journey in 2004 as a keyboardist in his local church. However, he officially started his music career in 2012 with the debut single "Hope". That same year, he released his sophomore single titled "Oremi" featuring Brenda Moses.

Mac Roc released his first album "Unstripped - Mac Roc Sessions, Vol. 1 (Acoustic)" in April 2022, comprising 16 tracks.

Mac Roc was announced as one of the judges alongside Simi Drey and Daniel Etim Effiong for Covers Africa Season 2, a music TV show and competition. In March 2023, he ventured on a talent hunt for upcoming artistes in states across Nigeria.

== Discography ==
=== Album ===
| Title | Details | Ref |
|---|---|---|
| Unstripped Vol 1 | Date Released: October 2022 Number of tracks: 16 Format: streaming, digital download | |
| Ascension | Date Released: November 2024 Number of tracks: 8 Format: streaming, digital download | |

=== Singles ===
| Title | Year released |
|---|---|
| Hope | 2012 |
| Ore Mi | 2012 |
| Without You (Mac Roc featuring Ginika) | 2016 |
| Yahweh (Mac Roc featuring E-Daniels) | 2016 |
| You Alone (Mac Roc featuring Kelvocal) | 2017 |
| Shine (Mac Roc featuring Stanflux) | 2017 |

=== Production discography ===
List of songs produced
| Title | Year released | Album | Ref |
|---|---|---|---|
| Yahweh (Eben) | 2015 | The Harvest | |
| Chukwu Okike (Samsong) | 2016 | Non-Album Single | |
| Wish Me Well - Cover (Timi Dakolo) | 2016 | Non-Album Single | |
| God of the Nations (Samsong Ft Eben) | 2017 | Non-Album Single | |
| Koseunti (Sunmisola Agbebi) | 2022 | Non-Album Single | |
| Want You - Acoustic Version (Oxlade) | 2023 | Non-Album Single | |
| My Daddy, My Daddy - Acoustic Version (Sunmisola Agbebi) | 2023 | Non-Album Single | |
| Izrukeme (Dr. Ymc featuring Neon Adejo, Tobi Osho and Adachi) | 2023 | Non-Album Single | |
| B'Ola (Honour) (Sunmisola Agbebi) | 2023 | Non-Album Single | |

== Awards ==
| Title | Category | Year | Results |
|---|---|---|---|
| Top Naija Music Awards | Best Song With A Message | 2012 | Won |
