= Adekunle =

- Gender: Male
- Language: Yoruba

Origin
- Origin: Nigeria
- Meaning: The crown fills the house
- Region of origin: South-west Nigeria

Adékúnlé audio is a name of Yoruba origin, meaning "the crown or royalty fills up the (family) house."

== Given name ==
- Adekunle Adejuyigbe, Nigerian filmmaker and producer
- Adekunle Adesoji, Nigerian Paralymupic sprinter
- Adekunle Adeyeye (born 1968), Nigerian academic and university administrator
- Adekunle Adeyoola, Nigerian gospel rap artist, actor, and businessman
- Adekunle Akinlade (born 1969), Nigerian politician
- Adekunle Fajuyi (1926–1966), Nigerian Army officer and martyred military governor of Western Nigeria
- Adekunle Gold (born 1987), Nigerian musician
- Adekunle Lawal (1934–1980), Nigerian military officer and former Governor of Lagos State
- Adekunle Lukmon (born 1984), Nigerian footballer
- Adekunle Ojora (born 1932), Nigerian businessman
- Michael Adekunle Ajasin (1908–1997), Nigerian politician
- Adekunle Adeniyii (born 1988) first Mushin (Lagos) born to school in University of Derby, UK

== Surname ==
- Benjamin Adekunle, Nigerian Army officer who led the successful assault on Biafra in the Nigerian Civil War
- Prince Adekunle, Nigerian musician
