= Emmanuel Iren =

Nigerian gospel artist and pastor (born 1989)

- Born: Emmanuel Aniefiok Iren; 18 December 1989 (age 36)
- Origin: Akwa Ibom, Nigeria
- Occupations: Singer; songwriter; pastor
- Instruments: Vocals and drums
- Years active: 2008–present
- Spouse: Laju Iren

Emmanuel Aniefiok Iren (born 18 December 1989), known as Emmanuel Iren, is a Nigerian preacher, gospel singer, and songwriter. He is the founder of Celebration Church International (CCI), headquartered in Lagos, Nigeria. He is the current President of the Pentecostal Fellowship of Nigeria (PFN) Youth Wing.

As part of his music career, he is the President of Outburst Music Group, a gospel music band formed out of the church choir for which he has written fourteen songs across the albums Kerygma released in 2017 and Octane released in 2020. He also wrote the band's most recent single "Light Up The Way" which featured the gospel artist Eben. In 2022, he released his album Apostolos: Sounds of Transition.

== Early life and education ==
Iren comes from Akwa Ibom State, Nigeria. He completed his primary education at Saint Bernadette's Nursery and Primary School in Ipaja, Lagos. He went on to Queen's Choice Nursery and Primary School College in Ikotun, Lagos and later attended Doregos Private Academy where he acquired his secondary education.

In 2011, he obtained a bachelor's degree in Building Technology from Covenant University, Ota, Nigeria. He also holds a Master of Business Administration from the University of Lagos, Nigeria.

== Ministry ==
In 2008, Emmanuel Iren started a Christian campus fellowship known as Triumphal Youth Fellowship as an undergraduate student in Covenant University. The fellowship soon grew beyond the campus walls, and into a full-time ministry.

On 11 November 2012, the Life Triumphal Church was opened in Lagos. Two years after, in 2014, it was renamed the Celebration Church International, also known as CCI. Presently, the Celebration Church International has over 100,000 members worldwide with 30 branches: across Nigeria, the United Kingdom, Canada and the USA.

On 11 June 2025, Emmanuel Iren was inaugurated as the President of the Pentencostal Fellowship of Nigeria (PFN) Youth Wing. A position he is expected to hold for a period of four years. He is also the chairman of the Executive Council that also has members Apostle Femi Lazarus, Reverend Ohis Ojeikere, Pastor Daniel Olawande, Pastor Oge C. Ogwe, Pastor Philip Olubakin, Pastor Olumese E. Olumese, Pastor Anwinli Ojeikere, Pastor Olusola Okodugha, Pastor Sam Obiora, and Pastor Karis Ameh Wealth.

In a bid to disciple a lot of people around the world and answer different Bible questions, Pastey is known to organize an online class which is tagged 100 Days of Discipleship, (100DOD) which is aired every week day on his YouTube channel.

== Career ==
=== Music career ===
Emmanuel Iren debuted his first album Kerygma in 2017 with the Outburst Music Group. In 2021, he was featured by Nigerian gospel artiste Odunayo Adebayo in the hit song "Zoe".

In August 2022, he announced the release of his second album Apostolos: Voice of Transition, which comprised 13 tracks including "Overcome", "In Your Name", "Holy Ghost" and "Glory". The album featured other gospel artistes like Sinach, Nosa and Judikay. Shortly after its release, the album peaked as one of the top 10 on Apple Music.

=== Filmmaking ===
Iren made his debut movie as an executive producer with What About Us which released nationwide on 12 July 2024.

He released his second movie, titled Meltdown , on 24 July 2026. The story focuses on mental health, family trauma, and dealing with unresolved anger. The cast includes: Efa Iwara, Timini Egbuson, Omowunmi Dada, and Olumide Oworu.

== Discography ==
=== Albums ===
Year of Release	Title	Details	Ref
2018	Kerygma (feat Outburst Music Group)	Recording Type: Live; No. of Tracks: 15; Format: Digital Download, Streaming	
2021	Prophetic Chant (Live) (feat Nosa)	Recording Type: Live; Format: Digital Download, Streaming	
2022	Apostolos: (Sounds of Transition)	Recording Type: Live; No. of Tracks: 13; Format: Digital Download, Streaming	
2024	Spirituals	Recording Type: Live; No. of Tracks: 12; Format: Digital Download, Streaming	

=== Singles ===
==== As lead artist ====
- Grace Changes Everything (feat Sinach)
- Holy Ghost (feat Sinach)
- Overcome (feat E-Daniels)
- Prophetic Chant (feat Nosa)
- Fire on my Altar
- Power in Abundance (feat Bajulaye Victor)
- The Glory (feat Outburst Music Group)
- Yes To Your Will
- In Your name (feat Judikay)
- The Glory of the Lord reveals
- Agalliao (feat Nathaniel Bassey)
- Agbara Olorun po (feat Yetunde Are)
- Anointed (feat Godswill Oyor)

==== As featured artist ====
- Zoe (Odunayo Adebayo feat Emmanuel Iren)
- Bo Ta Jor (Prinx Emmanuel feat Emmanuel Iren)
- Agalliao (Aigbeh Dgong ft Pastor Emmanuel Iren)
- Ambience (Damilola Praiseworth ft Pastor Emmanuel Iren)

== Bibliography ==
- Leading Seeks You
- Purposefully
- Am I Being Fooled? FAQs about God, the Bible and Jesus Christ
- Saving Grace
- LoveCode
- Come To Me Bible Book
- Pray Book: Strategies for Building a Prayer Life

== Personal life ==
Iren married Laju Arenyeka (now Laju Iren) in November 2014. They have three daughters and one son.

== Recognition ==
- In 2021, he was mentioned in YNaija Magazine among the 100 most influential people in ministry in Nigeria.
- In 2022, Apostolos was nominated as the album of the year (Kingdom Achievers Awards)
- In 2023, he was bestowed with an honorary Doctorate Degree from Myles Leadership University.
