= Folabi Nuel =

Nigerian gospel musician (born 1992)

- Born: Afolabi Emmanuel Fagbemi; January 7, 1992 (age 34); Lagos State, Nigeria
- Genres: Contemporary worship; contemporary gospel; pop
- Occupations: Singer; songwriter; producer
- Instruments: Vocals; Guitar; Keyboard
- Years active: 2015–present

Afolabi Emmanuel Fagbemi, popularly known as “Folabi Nuel” (born 7 January 1992) is a United Kingdom-based Nigerian gospel singer, songwriter and worship leader. He released his first ever single "God of Heaven" in 2015, which later ranked as Number 1 on the "Rhythm 93.7FM" and “Holy Holla Top 5”.

== Early life ==
Folabi Nuel was born on 7 January 1992 in Lagos State, Nigeria. He grew up singing in the choir but started writing songs as a teenager in secondary school. At first, music was a way he comforted himself and expressed his feelings. With time, he started writing worship songs for his fellowship choir in secondary school. He obtained his Bachelor's Degree from the Federal University of Agriculture, Abeokuta, Ogun State. He has an MBA in International Business from Universidad Católica San Antonio de Murcia, Spain.

Folabi Nuel married Gboremi in September 2022.

== Music career ==
Folabi Nuel started singing from a young age but his music career officially started in 2015 with his debut single “God of Heaven” which peaked as no. 1 on the “Rhythm 93.7FM” and “Holy Holla Top 5” for several weeks after its release. Subsequently, he returned with his sophomore single, a song titled “Everlasting” that same year. In 2017, he released another single titled "My Heart".

His first album "Good God" was released in 2017. In 2020, Folabi Nuel released his second album live "Hunger - From Our Heart to Yours" consisting of 15 tracks and featuring gospel artistes like Nosa, TY Bello, Freke Umoh, Prospa Ochimana and Minister Kenn. His subsequent album titled "Revival Is In The Air (RIITA)" was released in July 2022.

Folabi Nuel debuted his first extended play "Songs From My Bedroom" in May 2020. In September 2022, he released his second EP "Bobibi" featuring artistes like Remii, Johnny Drille and Timi Dakolo. The EP album which was released on his wedding day consisted of romance/love songs and included tracks like 911, Be Mine and For You.

On 7 April 2023, he released a single “He’s Alive” featuring gospel artiste Sunmisola Agbebi.

== Discography ==
=== Studio albums ===
List of Studio Albums
Title	Album details	Year released
Good God	Number of Tracks: 8; Label: Showgear Records; Formats: Streaming, digital download	2017
Revival Is In The Air (RIITA)	Number of Tracks: 12; Label: Showgear Records; Formats: Streaming, digital download	2022

=== Live albums ===
List of Live Albums
Title	Music Details	Year released
Hunger - From Our Heart to Yours	Number of Tracks: 15; Label: Showgear Records; Formats: Streaming, digital download	2020

=== Extended plays ===
List of EPs
Title	Music Details	Year released
Songs From My Bedroom	Number of Tracks: 6; Formats: Streaming, digital download	2020
Bobibi	Number of Tracks: 5; Formats: Streaming, digital download	2022

=== Singles ===
As lead artiste
Year	Title	Album
2015	Everlasting	Non-Album Single
2015	God of Heaven	Non-Album Single
2017	My Heart	Non-Album Single
2018	Good God	Non-Album Single
2022	Glory	Non-Album Single
2022	At the Altar	Non-Album Single
2023	Melody	Non-Album Single
2023	He's Alive	Non-Album Single

=== Other appearances ===
As a featured artiste
Title	Year released	Ref
I Still Believe by Mr. Ibk (featuring Folabi Nuel)	2020	
If God be for me by Nosa (featuring Folabi Nuel)	2020	
Chasing Doubt by Jo Deep (feat. Tomiwa Immanuel & Folabi Nuel)	2020	
Fire Fire by TY Bello (featuring Greatman Takit, Folabi Nuel and 121 Selah)	2022	
The Weight of Your Glory by TY Bello (featuring Greatman Takit, Folabi Nuel and 121 Selah)	2022	
Hallelujah by Tomi Favored (featuring Folabi Nuel)	2022	
Sugar Melody by Same OG (featuring Folabi Nuel)	2023	

== Awards and nominations ==
Year	Award	Result	Ref
2018	The Beatz Awards	Nominated	
2018	Africa Gospel and Media Awards UK	Nominated	
