= Psalmos =

Nigerian gospel singer (born 1981)

Mobolaji Yemisi Adekunle-Oniyo, (born October 31, 1981), popularly known as Psalmos, is a Nigerian gospel singer, praise and worship leader and a songwriter who rose to prominence following the release of her song "Oluwa ku'se" featuring K'ore. Since then, Psalmos has ministered in a number of churches across Nigeria and the UK, including Gloryhouse church in London.

== Early life and career ==
Psalmos was born in Ekiti State, Nigeria, the youngest of six children. She attended Community High School, Ojodu Abiodu, Berger, Lagos State, and then went to the University of Ado Ekiti, where she obtained a diploma in Banking and Finance. She also earned a B.Sc. in Industrial Relations and Personnel Management from Lagos State University.

Psalmos worked as a banker for three years at Reliance Bank, worked for an aluminium company, and was employed by Avion Travels. She became a music minister after she joined the choir in Christ Livingspring Apostolic Ministry (CLAM) in 2004.

Psalmos is married to her music producer, Dekunle Oniyo.

== Discography ==
=== Studio albums ===
- Ku ishe featuring Kenny K’ore
- Jesu Joba featuring Tope Alabi
- Oku Itoju mi
- Miracle Working God
- Orin Titun
- Odara
- Big God
- Mogbagbo
- Emmanuel
- Agame
- Kos'Oba Bire (ft. Tope Alabi)
