= Adejo (name) =

- Gender: Male
- Language: Igala

Origin
- Origin: Nigeria
- Meaning: servant of God
- Region of origin: Christianity

Adejo audio is a male given Igala language name, which originated from Kogi State, the north-central part of Nigeria. In the Igala language, "Adejo" means "slave of God and God's servant."

Notable people with the name include:

- Neon Adejo Nigeria gospel singer
