= What About Us =

What About Us may refer to:

== Music ==
=== Albums ===
- What About Us (Livin Out Loud album) or the title song, 2006
- What About Us?, by Ruth-Ann Boyle, 2007

=== Songs ===
- "What About Us?" (Brandy song), 2002
- "What About Us" (The Coasters song), 1959
- "What About Us" (Jodeci song), 1994
- "What About Us" (Pink song), 2017
- "What About Us" (The Saturdays song), 2012
- "What About Us?" (Total song), 1997
- "What About Us", by ATB from Future Memories, 2009
- "What About Us", by Ella Henderson from Everything I Didn't Say, 2022
- "What About Us?", by John Barrowman from Music Music Music, 2008
- "What About Us?", by Ministry from Greatest Fits, 2001
- "What About Us?", by Point Break, 2000
- "Earth Song" (working title "What About Us"), by Michael Jackson, 1988

== Other uses ==
- What About Us (film), a 2024 Nigerian film
- What About Us?, a 1996 book by Maureen Freely

== See also ==
- Paradise (What About Us?), an EP by Within Temptation, or the title song
