= Jahdiel =

Nigerian Musical artist

- Born: Grace Jahdiel Okoduwa Omokhua; Ikoyi, Lagos State, Nigeria
- Genres: gospel; afrocentric pop
- Occupations: singer-songwriter, vocalist
- Instruments: Keyboard, Vocals
- Years active: 2006–present
- Labels: Loveworld; Hammer House

Grace Jahdiel Benjamin (maiden name 'Okoduwa') popularly known by her stage name Jahdiel, is a contemporary Nigerian gospel singer, songwriter and vocalist. She professionally began her music career in 2006, releasing her debut album Heritage in 2008. She is one of several gospel artists under Loveworld Records of Christ Embassy. Jahdiel is signed to Hammer House Records, a record label owned by her husband Eben.

== Early life and education ==
Jahdiel was born in Ikoyi, Lagos State, Nigeria, where she had her primary and secondary school education at Aunty Ayo International School, Ikoyi before proceeding to further her education by obtaining a BSc degree in Chemistry.

== Career ==
Jahdiel started singing at the age of five upon joining the choir of her local church before she began to play musical equipments like the piano and keyboard at the age of thirteen. After being part of various singing groups, she released her debut album Heritage in 2008 to massive reception, thereby gaining her new grounds in the industry and further earning her a nomination spot in the "Most Promising Artist or Group" category at the 2008 edition of Kora Awards. Her follow-up album Under Oath was released in 2010. Contained with songs like "Ebube Dike", "Oh God" and "Ayaya", Under Oath earned her a nomination at the 2013 Nigeria Gospel Music Awards. In November 2015, she released her third studio album titled Majesty. In 2017, she was listed in YNaija's list of "100 Most Influential People in Christian Ministry in Nigeria".

== Artistry ==
Jahdiel's music style is influenced by a blend of rock, English and afrocentric pop. When asked about her style of gospel music, she told The Nation: "I think the blend of the English pop with African music makes it very, very different. If you listen to it for the first time you probably feel it's not from Nigeria". Her musical influences include Kirk Franklin and Celine Dion.

== Discography ==
=== Studio albums ===
- Heritage (2008)
- Under Oath (2010)
- Majesty (2015)

== Awards and nominations ==
| Year | Award ceremony | Prize | Recipient/Nominated work | Result | Ref |
|---|---|---|---|---|---|
| 2008 | 2008 Kora Africa Music Awards | Most Promising Artist or Group | Herself | Nominated | |
| 2013 | Nigerian Gospel Music Video Awards 2013 | Best Contemporary Music Video | "Oh God" | Nominated | |
| 2013 | Nigeria Gospel Music Awards 2013 | Best Rock Artist | Herself | Nominated | |

== Personal life ==
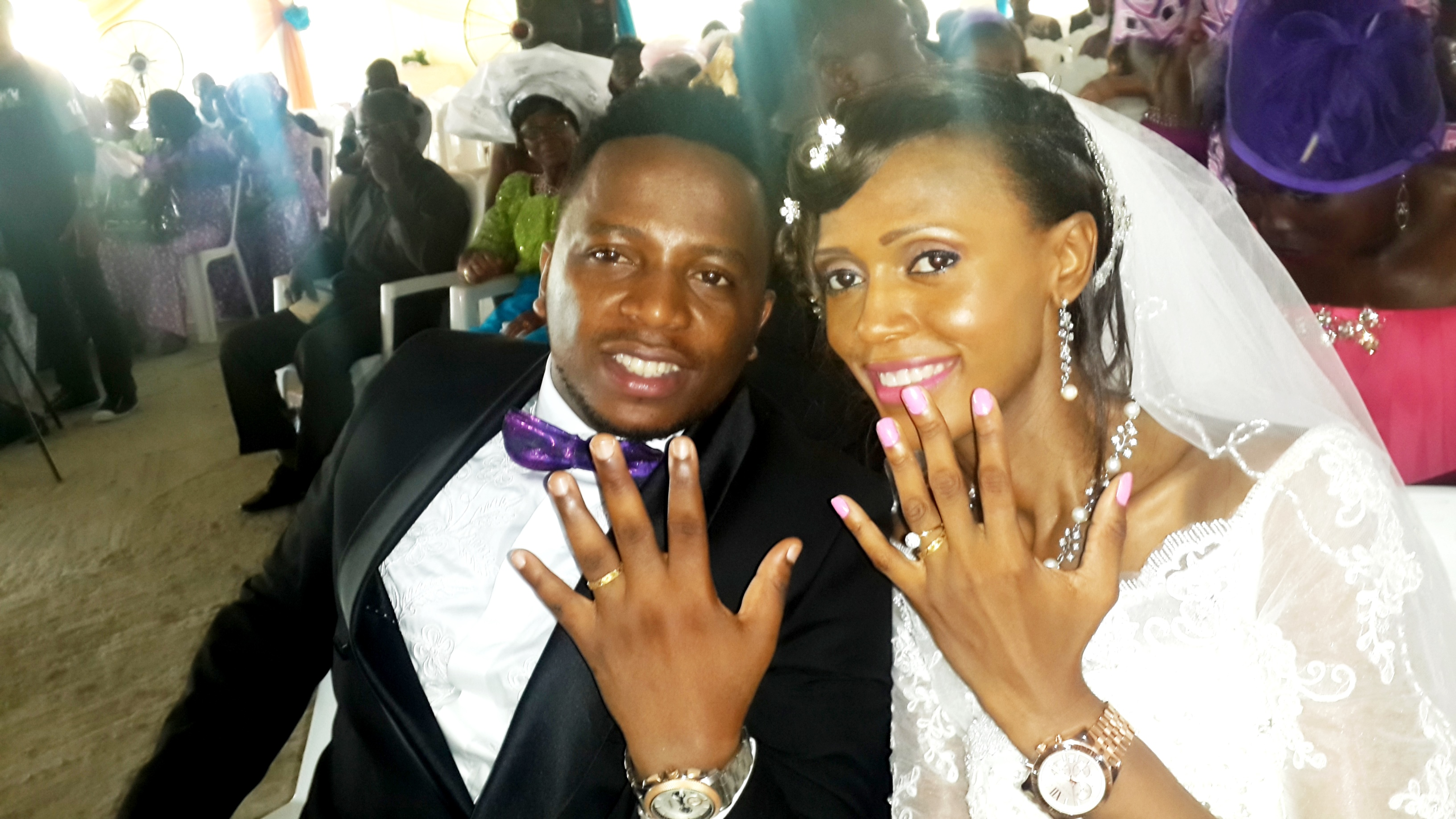
Eben and Jahdiel during their wedding in 2013

On 30 November 2013, she married Emmanuel Benjamin, popularly known as Eben (singer), a Nigerian gospel singer with whom she has two children.

== See also ==
- List of Nigerian gospel musicians
