= Chinyere Udoma =

Nigerian gospel singer (born 1976)

- Also known as: Odudu Woman, Lady of Songs, Dutchess of Music, Ambassador Chinyere
- Born: 1976; Ibadan, Nigeria
- Origin: Nigeria
- Genres: gospel, contemporary gospel, worship
- Occupations: Singer, songwriter
- Instrument: Vocals
- Years active: 1999–present
- Label: CGVM studio musics
- Spouse: Ifeanyi Akaekpuchionwa

Chinyere Udoma (born 1976) is a Nigerian gospel singer-songwriter. She is best known for her use of the Igbo language. She released her first album “Ịdịghị ajọ njọ” in 1999, and subsequently, other powerful albums such as Agunechemba, Pure praise 1&2, Adim Well Loaded, Wind of Glory, and many more.

== Early life and education ==
Udoma had her education in mass communication from University of Nigeria although she was born in Ibadan. She is from Igbo descent. She started out as a chorister at St Mary's Catholic Church, Nnokwa where she garnered recognition. In 1999, she debuted her first song, "Ị dịghị ajọ njọ." In 2018 during the Women of Praise inaugural concert, She was featured alongside Cece Winans to perform.

== Personal life ==
She is married to Ifeanyi Akaekpuchionwa, whom she said had met in a crusade.

== Accolades ==
Her songs have been featured in CLIMA awards. Her debut, Agu N'eche mba, has been praised on African contemporary musical education calling it "Christology." In 2022, The Stone Magazine awarded her the Gospel Artiste of the year for South East, Nigeria. She was nominated as the stage most outstanding music minister of the year for the 2023 CLIMA AFRICA Awards.

== Discography ==
=== Albums ===
- Idighi Ajo Njo (1999)
- Glorious Praise (1999)
- Agu N’eche Mba (2000)
- Divine Praise (2001)
- Evergreen Worship (2001)
- Chim Si Afo N’afo Goziem (2002)
- Omeokachie (2002)
- Chim Mechiri Akwukwo (2003)
- Pure Praise (2005)
- Pure Praise 2 (2008)
- Wind of Glory (2009)
- Adim Well Loaded (2010)
- It’s Done (Omewo Ya) (2013)
- Marvelous God (2016)
- Manifestation Time (Udo Di) (2016)
- Endless (2019)
- Merciful God (2021)
- Walk With Jesus (2021)
- Eze Mmuo (ENDLESS WALK WITH JESUS RELOADED) (2023)
- Eze Abata track (2025)

=== EPs ===
- Year Of Blessing (2024)

=== Singles ===
- Agu N'eche mba
- Adim Well Loaded
- Pure Praise
- Wind Of Glory
- To You Be All The Glory
- Jesus Surprise Me
- Come and See
- The Marvelous God
- Jehovah Mara Over
- Oke Ebube
- Chimamaka
- Imenem l
- Ebenebe
- Eze Abata
- Oke Orimili

== See also ==
- List of Nigerian gospel musicians
- List of Nigerian musicians

== Work cited ==
- Njoku, M.C.Anya (2017). "Revamping the unpopularity of music as a school subject in Nigeria through indigenization: A Proposal". International Journal of Social Sciences and Humanities Reviews. 7 (1). ISSN 2276-8645.
