= Mega 99 =

Nigerian gospel singer

Abel Oluwafemi Dosunmu, known as Mega 99, is a Nigerian gospel juju musician and songwriter.

== Early life ==
Mega99 was born in Oshodi, Lagos State, Nigeria. He obtained a Bachelor of Science (B.Sc) degree in accountancy from Olabisi Onabanjo University.

== Career ==
In 1994, Mega99 established a musical group called Abel Dosunmu and the Mega 99 Band. His debut album titled My mother was released in 1998, another album titled Prayer was released in 2000, and his album titled Money was released in 2004. He later released "Ona Ara" in 2006 followed by "Weep Not" in 2008 and Thanksgiving in 2010. Another album titled Victory at last was released in 2012, Fear Not in 2013 and Emajo Emayo in 2014. Mega 99 has also sang songs alongside some other gospel singers in nigeria like Bola Are.

== Discography ==
- My Mother (1998)
- Prayer (2000)
- Money (2003)
- Ona Ara (2006)
- Weep Not (2008)
- Thanksgiving (2010)
- Fear Not (2013)
- Emajo Emayo (2014)

== See also ==
- List of Nigerian gospel musicians
