= Victor Thompson (musician) =

Nigerian gospel singer

- Born: Victor Ufuoma Thompson; November 11, 1986 (age 39); Lagos State, Nigeria
- Origin: Delta State
- Genres: Contemporary worship; contemporary gospel
- Occupations: Singer; songwriter
- Instrument: Vocals
- Years active: 2017–present
- Spouse: Henrietta Victor Thompson
- Website: victorthompsonmusic.com

Victor Ufuoma Thompson known professionally as Victor Thompson (born 11 November 1986) is a Nigerian gospel singer and songwriter.He is notable for the song “This Year (Blessings)” released in January 2023.

== Biography ==
Victor Thompson was born on 11 November 1986 in Lagos State, Nigeria but originally hails from Okpara-Inland in Ethiope East Local Government Area of Delta State. He had his primary education at St. Anthony Nursery and Primary School, and later moved to Caleb International School, while he had his secondary education at Government College, Ikorodu both in Lagos State.

He obtained his Bachelor's Degree from the Federal University of Petroleum Resources, Effurun, Delta State in Environmental Science.

== Career ==
Thompson started singing at an early age. He was a contestant in The Voice Nigeria, Season 2 in 2017.

He debuted the music scene officially with his first single "Miyeruwe" in November, 2018. In January 2023, he released the single "This Year (Blessings)" featuring Nigerian co-singer Ehis D'Greatest. The single topped the Billboard U.S. Afrobeats chart at number 35 and also peaked as No. 14 in the United Kingdom according to the Official Charts.

In July 2023, he was nominated for the 16th Headies Awards in the category for Best Inspirational Single, alongside Davido, Neon Adejo, Nathaniel Bassey and others.

== Singles ==
- You Are Jesus with Phil Thompson (2024)
- This Year (Blessings) Ft Ehis D'Greatest (2023)
- My Back (2022)
- Not Moved (2022)
- Fall in Love (2022)
- Thank You (2022)
- Miyeruwe (2018)

== Awards/nominations ==
| Year | Award | Category | Result | Ref |
|---|---|---|---|---|
| 2024 | Billboard Music Awards | Top Gospel Song | Nominated | |
| 2023 | The Headies | Best Inspirational Single | Nominated | |
| 2023 | Premier Gospel Awards | Best International Artist | Nominated | |
| 2023 | Kingdom Achievers Award | Digital Artiste of the year | Won | |
| 2023 | Kingdom Achievers Award | Viewers Choice | Nominated | |
| 2023 | Marathana Awards | Best Overall Hit Song | Won | |
| 2023 | Marathana Awards | Best Prophetic/Uplifting Song (Africa) | Won | |
| 2023 | Marathana Awards | Best Thanksgiving song (Africa) | Won | |
| 2023 | Marathana Awards | Best Collaboration Song | Won | |
