= Ossy Brown =

Nigerian singer-songwriter

- Born: Osamudiamhen Kingsley Idemudia; Lagos, Nigeria
- Genres: Soul; jazz; R&B; Afrobeats; EDM; Gospel
- Occupations: Singer; songwriter; producer
- Years active: 2009–present
- Label: Crystalcity Records

Osamudiamhen Kingsley Idemudia professionally known as Ossy Brown is a Nigerian-born singer-songwriter and music producer, based in the United Kingdom. He is popularly known for his breakout songs, OMG, Love it x2 and Osamudiamhen, for which he received the Maranatha Awards (USA) for Best Gospel Album, and the Rhema Awards (UK) for Artist of Excellence in 2022.

== Early life ==
Ossy Brown was born in Lagos, in southwestern Nigeria, and is from Igueben LGA, Edo State in the South-south region of Nigeria. He had his high school education in King's College Lagos and obtained a bachelor's degree in Geophysics from Ambrose Alli University, Ekpoma in 2012. He also has a master's degree in international business from the University of Hertfordshire, and a Diploma in Cinematography from London Film Academy.

== Career ==
Ossy Brown began his career as a professional recording and performing artiste in 2009. In 2014, he released his first major hit single, Love it 2x, which enjoyed rave reviews and airplay on radio and online platforms. He followed it up with the release of Gbuke in 2015. These offerings earned him nominations for Xclusive Gospel Award for Next Rated Artiste in 2015 and Best New Act at the LIMA Awards in 2016.

In 2021, after relocating to the UK, Ossy Brown released his third studio album LED, which had the breakout single, Osamudiamhen. After which he hosted a virtual concert, The LED Experience, which garnered several thousand views online. The album earned him the Maranatha Award for Best Gospel Album and the Rhema Award for Artiste of Excellence.

In 2023, he released two singles, "Slow Whyne" and "Roma Roma (Mr Romantic)", which have been lauded as showing his range and versatility and enjoyed appreciable airplay on digital and terrestrial platforms.

Ossy Brown founded his own record label, Crystalcity Entertainment, where he has signed on two Afrobeats artistes, Lakhid and Juvy Jakes.

== Discography ==
=== Studio albums ===
- Unleash (2012)
- My Life (2019)
- LED (2021)

=== Selected singles ===
Single	Year released
Love it 2x	2014
Gbuke	2015
Love to Love You	2021
Osamudiamhen	2021
Slow Whyne	2023
Roma Roma	2023

== Awards and recognition ==
Year	Award	Category	Result	Ref.
2015	Xclusive Gospel Awards	Next Rated Artiste	Nominated	
2016	LIMA Awards	Best New Act	Nominated	
2022	Rhema Awards (UK)	Artiste of Excellence	Won	
2022	Maranatha Awards (USA)	Best Gospel Album	Won	

== See also ==
- List of Nigerian gospel musicians
