= Celebration Church International =

Church in Nigeria founded in 2012

- Classification: Evangelicalism
- Theology: Charismatic
- Origin: 11 November 2012 (13 years ago) Ikotun Lagos, Nigeria
- Official website: ccing.org

Celebration Church International (also known as CCI) is an international orthodox and charismatic Christian denomination headquartered in Lagos, Nigeria. It was founded by Emmanuel Iren and has several branches located in Nigeria, the United Kingdom, United States and Canada.

== History ==
Celebration Church International first started as a campus youth fellowship called "Triumphal Youth Fellowship" in Covenant University, Ota, Ogun State. The fellowship was founded in 2008, and was led by Emmanuel Iren while he was an undergraduate student at the university.

In November 2012, the church was officially established and inaugurated. Two years after, in 2014, the church was renamed from Life Triumphal Church to Celebration Church International.

The church's first branch was in opened in Ikotun, Lagos. With time, Celebration Church International was moved to Ikeja and later expanded to other parts of the world.

== Locations ==
Celebration Church International has over 54 campuses worldwide. There are over 30 campuses in different cities in Nigeria including Lagos, Abuja, Port Harcourt, Abeokuta, Uyo, Warri, Ife, Akure, Enugu, and Ibadan. Its headquarters is located in Ikeja, Lagos State, Nigeria.

Celebration Church International also has nine campuses located in the United Kingdom, three in London (CCI West London, CCI South East London and CCI East London), two in Birmingham (Birmingham Central and Birmingham West), two in Greater Manchester (Manchester and Bolton), one in Coventry and one in Glasgow, Scotland. There are eight campuses in Canada (Toronto, Winnipeg, Hamilton, Calgary, Barrie, Oshawa, Edmonton and Ottawa) and four campuses in the United States(Dallas, DMV, Boston and Austin).

== Beliefs ==
The theological standing of the church is Orthodox but the ministry is yet Charismatic. The church's website outlines that it believes in the death, burial, and resurrection of Christ.
