= Open Doors (album) =

Studio album by Nosa
- Released: 14 March 2014
- Recorded: 2013–2014
- Genre: R&B, soul
- Length: 1:02:45
- Label: Chocolate City
- Producer: Nosa (also exec.); Audu Maikori; Eddy Isaacs; Bigfoot of Micworx; Tune x; Ultrasound; Dr Drexx

Singles from Open Doors
- 1. "Always Pray For You" Released: 21 January 2013; 2. "Why You Love Me" Released: 15 August 2013; 3. "Always On My Mind" Released: 12 February 2014

Open Doors is the first studio album by Nigerian Gospel artist Nosa. The album was released by Chocolate City on 14 March 2014. It was supported by the hit single "Always Pray For You", which peaked at number 5 on Nigezie's and peaked at number 6 at Rhythm Radio Afrobeat chart. The album features Chocolate City artist MI. Production was handled by Nosa, Audu Maikori, Eddy Isaacs, Bigfoot of Micworx, Tune x, Ultrasound and Dr Drexx.

== Background and production ==
The album was mixed and mastered by Bigfoot at Micworx Studios, Lagos.

== Singles ==
On 21 January 2013, Nosa released the album's lead single "Always Pray For You". The music video for the single was shot and directed in Lagos by AK One; it was uploaded onto YouTube on February 7, 2013, and ran for 4 minutes and 5 seconds.

On 15 August 2013, "Why You Love Me" was released by "Why You Love Me" as the album's third single.

On 12 February 2014, "Always on My Mind" was released by "Always on My Mind" as the album's eight single.

== Track listing ==
No.	Title	Writer(s)	Producer(s)	Length
1.	"A Star"	Nosa Omoregie	Nosa; Bigfoot of Micworx	4:02
2.	"Always Pray For You"	Nosa Omoregie	Nosa; Bigfoot of Micworx	3:59
3.	"Why You Love Me"	Nosa Omoregie	Nosa	3:36
4.	"No Worry"	Nosa Omoregie	Nosa	4:55
5.	"I Go Stay"	Nosa Omoregie	Nosa; Bigfoot of Micworx	5:01
6.	"Higher"	Nosa Omoregie	Nosa	4:55
7.	"Already Done"	Nosa Omoregie	Nosa; Bigfoot of Micworx	5:21
8.	"Always On My Mind"	Nosa Omoregie	Nosa	4:21
9.	"Vanity"	Nosa Omoregie	Nosa; Bigfoot of Micworx	4:39
10.	"Just One Encounter"	Nosa Omoregie	Nosa	3:44
11.	"Open Doors"	Nosa Omoregie	Nosa	4:25
12.	"Undisputed"	Nosa Omoregie	Nosa; Dr Drexx	5:26
Total length:				1:02:45

Bonus track
No.	Title	Writer(s)	Producer(s)	Length
13.	"God Bless Nigeria"	Nosa Omoregie	Nosa; Ultrasound	3:59
14.	"Always On My Mind (remix)" (featuring MI)	Nosa; MI		4:22

== Personnel ==
- Nosa Omoregie - Primary artist, producer, executive producer
- Jude Abaga - featured artist
- Ultrasound - Producer
- Dr Drexx - Producer
- Bigfoot of Micworx - Producer
