= Greatman Takit =

Nigerian gospel singer (born 1992)

- Born: Greatman Ademola Takit; 11 March 1992 (age 34); Surulere, Lagos State
- Genres: Gospel Afrobeats; Gospel Hip-hop; Gospel Afropop; Contemporary worship; contemporary gospel
- Occupations: Singer; songwriter; rapper
- Years active: 2011–present

Greatman Ademola Takit, professionally known as Greatman Takit (born 11 March 1992), is a Nigerian songwriter, singer and artist. He released his first single "Ain't Nobody" in 2011 but gained popularity with his debut EP "Wildfire" in 2016.

== Early life and education ==
Greatman Takit was born on 11 March 1992 in Surelere, Lagos State, but originally hails from Kwara State. He studied at Government Science Secondary School, Pyakasa, Abuja and the Federal University of Technology, Minna.

== Career ==
Greatman started singing at an early age but officially debuted the music scene with his first single in 2011 titled "Ain't Nobody". His second official single “IJO” was released in 2013 and his third single titled “Farewemi” was released in 2014. His first EP "Wildfire" was released in October 2016 and comprised 9 tracks including "Jungle Up Here" and "Run" .

Greatman was a member of "The Gratitude", a Nigerian gospel music group but later left the group to continue his independent music career in 2020. He released another single "Sound of Rain" on 15 August 2019. His second EP "Energy" was released in 2021 and comprised 7 tracks.

In July 2023, the remix of the hit song "Daddy Wey Dey Pamper" was released by Moses Bliss featuring Greatman Takit and Prinx Emmanuel.

He made his acting debut in Undersiege, a musical produced by Mount Zion Film Production. The movie also featured Gaise Baba and Mike Abdul

== Discography ==
=== Albums ===
Year released	Title	Details
2016	Wildfire	Number of Tracks: 9 Format: Streaming, digital download
2021	Energy	Number of Tracks: 7 Format: Streaming, digital download
2022	Commando	Number of Tracks: 5 Format: Streaming, digital download
2024	Worship SZN	Number of Tracks: 8 Format: Streaming, digital download
2024	Ghetto Gospel	Number of Tracks: 8 Format: Streaming, digital download

=== Selected singles ===
==== As lead artist ====
- ADML (2026)
- Correct (2023)
- Holy Spirit (2024)
- Holiday (2025)
- In Your Arms (2023)
- Melody with Folabi Nuel and Limoblaze (2023)
- Look What You've Done (2022)
- Commando with Ko'rale (2022)
- Leave Am (2022)
- We Prevail Ft Nosa (2021)
- Bulie Ft Limoblaze (2021)
- Sound of Rain (2020)

==== As featured artist ====
- Jugular Jugular by Lawrence Oyor and Greatman Takit
- Daddy Wey Dey Pamper (Gbedu Version ) by Moses Bliss ft Greatman Takit and Prinx Emmanuel
- Heaven Has Come by TY Bello ft Greatman Takit
- Blessing and Favour by DJ Shunz ft Greatman Takit
- Fire Fire (TY Bello ft Greatman Takit, Folabi Nuel, 121 Selah)
- Follow Follow (Tim Godfrey ft Greatman Takit)
