= Ehis D'Greatest =

Nigerian gospel singer

- Born: Israel Ehinomen Okosun; 23 January 2002 (age 24); Abuja, Nigeria
- Origin: Edo State
- Genres: Afrobeats
- Occupations: Singer; songwriter
- Instrument: Vocals
- Years active: 2020–present

Israel Ehinomen Okosun, known by the stage name Ehis D'Greatest (born January 23, 2002) is a Nigerian Afrobeats singer and songwriter. He gained popularity with the song "This Year (Blessings)" released in January 2023. The song topped the Billboard Charts and went on to appear as No. 1 on the Official Charts in the United Kingdom. His music is featured on Apple Music.

== Biography ==
Okosun was born on January 23, 2002 in FCT Abuja, Nigeria, but hails originally from the Esan North East part of Edo State. He received his primary education at Ecole D'Excellence and pursued his secondary education at the Federal Government Academy in Suleja. In 2023, he obtained a Bachelor's degree in International Studies and Diplomacy from the University of Benin, Nigeria.

Israel's musical journey began at a young age, when he discovered his passion for music. His family amplified his passion for music throughout his childhood, as all four siblings also sang. He did not come from the richest family so getting started with his career was a struggle for him. He first discovered his actual passion for music at this University, and that jumpstarted his career.

Attending the University of Benin catapulted him to start his professional music career, where he took great influence from other Afrobeat artists such as Wande Coal and Victor Thompson.

== Career ==
Okosun debuted in the music industry in 2020 with the release of his single, “Love You”. In January 2023, at the age of 21, Israel and Victor Thompson released the hit record "This Year (Blessings)." The single quickly gained traction, topping the Billboard U.S Afrobeats chart, debuting at number 35, and peaking at number 3. Additionally, it reached the number 1 spot on the Official Charts in the United Kingdom. In October 2023, Israel and Victor Thompson collaborated with American rapper, Gunna to release a remix version of “This Year (Blessings)”. Since then, Ehis has culminated a total of 230.7 million plays on Spotify, with almost 3 million monthly listeners and over 5,000 followers.

== Awards/nominations ==
Year	Award	Category	Result	Ref
2024	Billboard Music Awards	Top Gospel Song	Nominated	
2023	The Headies	Best Inspirational Single	Nominated	
2022	Marathana Awards	Best Overall Hit Song	Won	
2022	Marathana Awards	Best Prophetic/Uplifting Song (Africa)	Won	
2022	Marathana Awards	Best Thanksgiving song (Africa)	Won	
2022	Marathana Awards	Best Collaboration Song	Won	
