= Sidney Wade =

American poet (born 1951)

- Born: 1951 (age 74–75); Englewood, New Jersey, U.S.
- Occupations: Professor, Department of English
- Years active: 1993–2016
- Employer: University of Florida
- Awards: Fulbright Fellowship

Academic background
- Education: University of Vermont; University of Houston
- Website: http://www.sidneywade.com/

Sidney Wade (born 1951) is an American poet. She held the position of professor of creative writing at the University of Florida, where she taught from 1993 through April 2016.

== Early life and education ==
Wade was born in Englewood, New Jersey, in 1951. She attended the University of Vermont, receiving a Bachelor of Arts degree in philosophy in 1974 and an M.Ed. in counseling in 1978. She earned a Ph.D in English from the University of Houston in 1994.

== Career ==
Wade decided she wanted to write after reading Willa Cather's Death Comes for the Archbishop, and has published multiple poetry collections, including Celestial Bodies, Green, From Istanbul/Istanbul'dan (1998), and Empty Sleeves (1990). Istanbul'dan/From Istanbul was published in Turkish and English by Yapi Kredi Publications. Stroke was published by Persea Books, as was Straits and Narrows. Atelier26 Books publisher her 2017 collection, Bird Book, and Johns Hopkins University published her 2020 collection, Deep Gossip.

Her poems have also appeared in The New Republic, The New Yorker, Poetry Magazine, Southern Review, and other publications. She co-translated a selection from the poems of Melih Cevdet Anday together with Efe Murad under the title Silent Stones: Selected Poems of Melih Cevdet Anday. The translation received the 2014 Meral Divitçi Prize. Some of these translations also appeared in literary journals such as The American Reader, Asymptote, Five Points, Critical Flame, Denver Quarterly, Guernica, The Kenyon Review Turkish Poetry Today, Poet Lore, and Two Lines.

Wade received a Fulbright Fellowship and was a senior lecturer at Istanbul University from 1989–1990. She was awarded the Stanley P. Young Fellowship from the Bread Loaf Writers' Conference in 1994. Wade was the president of the Association of Writers & Writing Programs in 2006 and 2007.

She served as the judge for the BkMk Press John Ciardi Prize for Poetry in 2009. Wade also served as faculty for the 26th through 30th Sewanee Writers' Conferences. (Note: 26th; 27th; 28th; 29th; 30th)

== Personal life ==
Wade lives in Gainesville, Florida. She has two children with ex-husband Padgett Powell.

== Works ==
- Empty Sleeves. University of Georgia Press. 1991. ISBN 978-082031-278-1.
- From Istanbul/Istanbul'dan. Istanbul: Yapi Kredi Yayinlar. 1998. ISBN 975-363-964-3.
- Green. University of South Carolina Press. 1998. ISBN 978-157003-267-7.
- Celestial Bodies. Louisiana State University Press. 2002. ISBN 978-080712-824-4.
- Stroke. New York: Persea Books. 2008. ISBN 978-0-89255-337-2. LCCN 2007038375.
- Straits & Narrows. New York: Persea Books. 2013. ISBN 978-0-89255-425-6.
- Bird Book. Atelier26 Books. 2017. ISBN 978-0-99765-233-8.
- Deep Gossip. Johns Hopkins University Press. 2020. ISBN 978-142143-788-0.

=== Translations ===
- Anday, Melih Cevdet (2017). Silent Stones: Selected Poems of Melih Cevdet Anday. Translated by Efe Murad; Sidney Wade. Northfield: Talisman. ISBN 978-1-58498-125-1.
- Yemenici, Elif (2022). Pina. Translated by Sidney Wade. Tilbury House Publishers. ISBN 978-0-88448-948-1.

== Sources ==
- "Contributors". Poetry. Vol. 168, no. 3. June 1996. pp. 172–174. JSTOR 40733285.
- "Contributors". Southwest Review. 81 (3): 461–463. Summer 1996. JSTOR 43471779.
- "Index to Volume 38 – 2002". The Southern Review. 2002. p. 930 – via Internet Archive.
- "Meral Divitçi Prize for Turkish Poetry in Translation". Nazim Hikmet Poetry Festival. n.d. Archived from the original on August 17, 2026.
- "New & Noteworthy / Poetry". The New York Times Book Review. April 5, 2020. p. 4(L). Gale A619448094.
- "Sewanee Writers' Conference". Poets & Writers Magazine. Vol. 46, no. 2. March 2018. pp. 128–129. Gale A527196013.
- "Sidney Wade". University of Florida. n.d. Archived from the original on August 17, 2026.
- "Spring 2016 Newsletter". MFA@FLA: Creative Writing. University of Florida. Spring 2016. Archived from the original on August 17, 2026.
- "Table of Contents". The New Republic. Vol. 217, no. 26. December 29, 1997. p. 3.
- "Voice". Guernica. May 1, 2012.
- Clark, Alisson (May 15, 2003). "The 'write' stuff for summer". The Gainesville Sun. Archived from the original on October 14, 2026.
- Davidson, Caroline (March 2016). "Sewanee Writers' Conference". Poets & Writers Magazine. Vol. 44, no. 2. p. 139. Gale A442041730.
- Davidson, Caroline (March 2017). "Sewanee Writers' Conference". Poets & Writers Magazine. Vol. 45, no. 2. p. 131. Gale A485578917.
- Derby, Edward (May 18, 2018). "A Book with Wings: Bird Book by Sidney Wade". The Rumpus. Archived from the original on August 17, 2026.
- Fronk, Katharine (April 15, 2013). "Straits & Narrows". Booklist. Vol. 109, no. 16. p. 6. Gale A327988371.
- Halpern, Dan (October 18, 2009). "Southern Discomfort". The New York Times Magazine. pp. 32–35. ProQuest 215468064.
- Hartig, Jean (November 2009). "Recent Winners". Poets & Writers Magazine. Vol. 37, no. 6. pp. 151–153. Gale A241944340.
- Hoffert, Barbara (May 1, 2008). "Wade, Sidney. Stroke". Library Journal. Vol. 133, no. 8. p. 70. Gale A178758092.
- Isokawa, Dana (March 2015). "Sewanee Writers' Conference". Poets & Writers Magazine. Vol. 43, no. 2. pp. 147–148. Gale A414825163.
- Isokawa, Dana (March 2019). "Sewanee Writers' Conference". Poets & Writers Magazine. Vol. 47, no. 2. p. 121. Gale A573558682.
- Kauffman, Ellen (January 2003). "Wade, Sidney. Celestial Bodies". Library Journal. Vol. 128, no. 1. pp. 115–116. Gale A97174489.
- Sultan Abdal, Pir (Summer 2005). "#247". The Kenyon Review. Vol. 27, no. 3. p. 21. Gale A133756100.
- Taylor, John (February 4, 2000). "Green". Poetry. Vol. 175, no. 4. p. 278. Gale A59410204.
- Thompson, Bill (March 31, 1996). "Novelist Powell returns to 'Edisto'". The Post and Courier. p. 7. ProQuest 373729565.
