= What About Us (film) =

2024 Nigerian film

What About Us (2024 film)
- Directed by: Kayode Kasum
- Produced by: Emmanuel Iren
- Starring: Kunle Remi; Folu Storms; Uzor Arukwe
- Release date: 12 July 2024
- Country: Nigeria
- Language: English

What About Us is a 2024 Nigerian film produced by Emmanuel Iren. The film which doubles as Emmanuel Iren's debut production was released to cinema nationwide on 12 July 2024. The film centers around complexities of marriages and how a Christian couple struggle to keep their marriage features in lead character; Kunle Remi, Uzor Arukwe, Folu Storms, Seyi Awolowo, Teniola Aladese and others.

== Synopsis ==
What About Us tells the story of a Christian couple who struggle to keep their marriage together, but more problem ensued when a new couple moves in next door and this further heightened the problem in their marriage. The story expands on the complexities of marriages as shown through the lenses of the two interwoven Christian couples.

== Selected cast ==
- Kunle Remi
- Uzor Arukwe
- Folu Storms
- Seyi Awolowo
- Teniola Aladese
- Atlanta Bridget Johnson
- Marycolette Unamka

== Production ==
The film which is directed by Kayode Kasum marks the Lead Pastor of Celebration Church International debut production work, he has stated that this new production cap that he has put on marks 'a new chapter in his mission to spread his message and shape culture'.
