= Kefee =

Nigerian gospel singer and composer (1980–2014)

- Born: February 5, 1980; Sapele, Delta, Nigeria
- Died: June 12, 2014 (aged 34) Los Angeles, California, United States
- Genre: Gospel
- Occupation: Singer
- Years active: 2000–2014

Evelyn Irikefe Don Momoh (February 5, 1980 – June 12, 2014), also referred to by her stage name Kefee, was a Nigerian gospel singer and composer.

== Early life ==
She was born in Sapele, Delta on February 5, 1980 to the family of Andrew Obareki, who were at a time deacons at a church founded by the parents of her ex-husband Alec Godwin. Kefee graduated from University of Benin with a degree in Business Administration. As a teenager, she actively engaged herself in church activities, especially singing in the choir.

== Career ==
As her passion for music kept growing bigger, she started writing and composing songs. In 2000 she released an album titled "Trip" that made her way into the Nigerian music scene as a Gospel artist. In 2003, she got signed to Alec's Entertainment, a record label founded by her former choir director, and she released her debut studio album Branama shortly after that. Branama sold nine thousand cassettes in three weeks and over two million CD/VCDs in a month. It served as a starting point for her successful career as a Nigerian gospel artist. Her best known hits are "Branama" and "Kokoroko".

== Awards ==
She was awarded the International Young Ambassador for Peace Award in 2009. Kefee won the 2010 Headies Awards for Best Collaboration with Timaya for "Kokoroko".

== Private life ==
Kefee was married twice. She was married to Alec Godwin for three years until 2008. She married radio host Teddy Esosa Don-Momoh on 3 March 2013 in Sapele, Delta state.

== Death and burial ==
Though the cause of death was rumoured to be pre-eclampsia, Kefee Obareki Don Momoh died of lung failure at a hospital in Los Angeles, California on June 12, 2014. She had been in a coma for fifteen days.

She was buried on Friday July 11, 2014 in her hometown Okpara Inland, Ethiope East Local Government Area of Delta State, Nigeria.

== Discography ==
Studio albums

- Branama (2003)
- Branama 2 (2005)
- A Piece Of Me (2008)
- A Chorus Leader (2012)

EPs

- Dan Maliyo (2012)

Posthumous albums

- Beautiful (2015)

== See also ==
- List of Nigerian gospel musicians
