= Tomi Favored =

Nigerian gospel singer

- Born: Adetomi Akinbode; March 20, 1987 (age 39); Kaduna, Nigeria
- Genres: Contemporary worship; contemporary gospel
- Occupations: Singer; songwriter; author
- Instrument: Vocals
- Years active: 2014–present

Adetomi Aleshinloye (born 20 March 1987) known professionally as ‘Tomi Favored’ is a Nigerian-American gospel artiste and songwriter. She debuted her first album in 2014 and is the convener of "B.O.W".

== Early life and career ==
Adetomi was born on 20 March 1987 to the family of Mr. and Mrs. Adebayo Akinbode in Northern Nigeria, Kaduna State. She is an indigene of Abeokuta, Ogun State, and grew up in a Christian home. Her mother was a nurse and her father was a soldier. At the age of 12, she moved to the United States to further her education.

She acquired her primary education from Command Primary School, Kaduna State. In 2005, she graduated from Etiwanda High School, California. In 2010, she completed her nursing program at North Valley.

Adetomi discovered her passion for music when she was a teenager. However, her music career officially started in 2014 with the debut of her first album ‘I am Tomi Favored’.

Adetomi is the co-convener of ‘B.O.W’, meaning "Bringing Our Worship". It is a live, non-denominational worship experience, with the first edition held in Dallas, Texas. She has collaborated with several other artists including Nathaniel Bassey, Tope Alabi, TY Bello among others.

== Discography ==
=== Albums ===
Year released	Title	Details
2014	I am Tomi Favored	Number of Tracks: 10; Formats: Streaming, digital download
2017	YHWH	Number of Tracks: 15; Formats: Streaming, digital download
2018	Jesus Christ in Everything	Number of Tracks: 12; Formats: Streaming, digital download
2019	Accompaniment	Number of Tracks: 12; Formats: Streaming, digital download
2019	Trusting Jesus	Number of Tracks: 10; Formats: Streaming, digital download
2019	Jesus in my Words	Number of Tracks: 10; Formats: Streaming, digital download
2024	More of Jesus	Number of Tracks: 12; Formats: Streaming, digital download
2024	Rep Jesus	Number of Tracks: 12; Formats: Streaming, digital download

=== Singles ===
- Committed to You (2022)
- You are Good (2022)
- Hallelujah (2022)
- Reckoning (2021)
- Do it all in love (2021)
- Ignite (2020)
- Wonderful God (2020)
- Jehovah (2020)
- You are God (2019)
- Jesus is the Way (2019)

== Bibliography ==
- Living to die
- Jesus in my thoughts

== Personal life ==
Adetomi is married to Seyi Alesh, a saxophonist and music teacher. They have two lively children, Isaac and Bella.
