= Snatcha =

Nigerian gospel singer

- Also known as: Soul Snatcha; Snatcha
- Born: Adekunle Adeyoola
- Genres: Christian hip hop; urban contemporary gospel; CCM; Reggae; gospel
- Occupations: HipHop Artist-Songwriter; Filmmaker; Musician; Producer

Adekunle Adeyoola, popularly known as Soul Snatcha or simply Snatcha, is a Nigerian gospel rap artist, actor and CEO of Assalt TV. He is part of the duo, Rooftop Mcs who released singles including Lagimo ft Cobhams, and Shock Therapy which were nominated for The Headies Award for Best Rap Single in 2008.

He formed Rooftop Mcs in 2002—the name was inspired by the Bible verse: Matthew 27: 10. The Group released four albums including "Shock Therapy", "The 2nd First Impression", "Minority Report" and "Back At One" and they also released several other singles.

After several years, the band went on a break in 2010. Snatcha moved to the UK, got married in 2011 and started his family. He released a solo album The Value of Nothing in 2016.

He also released the "Drunken Masters: Live" album in 2020 and other singles including "Mighty God (Drunk'n Worship)" with Nikki Laoye and "Children of God "featuring Angeloh.

Snatcha and his wife had 4 children. She died after a long-term illness in November 2019.

== See also ==
- List of Nigerian gospel musicians
