= Nimix =

Nigerian gospel singer (born 1995)

- Born: Ojonimi Abraham Ejigbo; 4 April 1989 (age 36); Kogi State, Nigeria
- Origin: Kogi State, Nigeria
- Genres: Afro gospel; contemporary gospel
- Occupations: Singer; songwriter
- Instruments: Vocals; piano
- Years active: 2013–present
- Spouse: Prisca Uyo-ojo (m. 2022)

Ojonimi Abraham Ejigbo (born 4 April 1989) better known by the stage name Nimix, is a Nigerian Afro gospel singer and songwriter. He is well known for the hit song “Sapa no fit catch me”, which was released in 2021

== Early life and education ==
Ojonimi Abraham Ejigbo was born on 4 April 1989 in Agodo Bassa, Kogi State. After his primary and secondary education, he proceeded to Demonstration Secondary School, Ankpa, Kofo state and graduated in 2007. In 2015, Nimix graduated from Kogi State University where he earned his bachelor's degree in accounting.

== Career ==
Ojonimi discovered his passion for music when he was a teenager. He played the keyboard for his local church where he also served in the choir and later joined the music group in his secondary school. However, his music career officially started in 2013, with his debut single "Alaye". In 2019, he released his first album Kilimanjaro comprising 14 tracks including "Open Doors" and "Demoot". In 2020, he released the hit single "Hasinibu" featuring Ada Ehi.

In 2020, he was signed to the Freenation record label. In December 2022, he announced the release of his first EP project Loud, comprising 6 tracks, and featuring Malawian rapper and singer, Gwamba.

== Discography ==
=== Albums ===
| Year | Title | Details | Ref |
|---|---|---|---|
| 2019 | Kilimanjaro | No. of tracks: 14 Format: | |
| 2022 | Uyomi | No. of tracks: 6 Format | |
| 2023 | Loud | No. of tracks: 8 Format | |

=== Singles ===
- "Chiwaya" (2022)
- "Jayama" (2022)
- "Jesus Nation" (2021)
- "Sapa No Fit Catch Me" (2021)
- "Oyel" (2021)
- "Hasinibu" (2020)
- "Do You Know Somebody" (2020)
- "Miracle Night" (2020)
- "Hand of God" (2019)
- "Alaye" (2013)

== Awards/nominations ==
| Year | Title | Category | Result |
|---|---|---|---|
| 2020 | Gospel Choice Music Awards | International Artist of the year | Nominated |

== Personal life ==
In 2022, Ojonimi married Prisca Uyo-ojo in Kogi State, Nigeria.
