= Joseph Adebayo Adelakun =

Nigerian gospel singer (born 1949)

- Born: June 11, 1949 (age 77); Saki, Oyo State, Nigeria
- Other name: Baba Ayewa
- Citizenship: Nigerian
- Occupations: gospel singer; songwriter; evangelist
- Years active: 1968 - present
- Website: Official website

Joseph Adebayo Adelakun (born June 12, 1949) is a Nigerian gospel singer, songwriter and televangelist.

== Early life ==
Adelakun was born into the family of Salami Adebayo who was a Muslim. He hails from Saki, a town situated in the northern part of Oyo State, western Nigeria. He was trained as an Electrical engineer at Kareem Electrical Engineering Company in the city of Ibadan, the capital of Oyo State. Having completed his training in 1968, he joined the Nigerian Army and was deployed to the Nigerian Army Barrack, the Engineering Construction Regiment at Ede in Oyo State. He was baptized at Christ Apostolic Church in 1972, the same year he began his evangelism.

== Career ==
In 1976, he was transferred to Kaduna where his musical career began as a member of the Christ Apostolic Church choir. His debut album titled Emi yio kokiki Re was released in 1978 and in 1982. He retired from the Nigerian Army to focus on gospel music, the same year he established a musical group called "Ayewa International Gospel Singers". He was famous for his 9th album titled Amona tete maa bo, released in 1984. He has released over 30 musical album over the years as a Nigerian gospel singer. He was honoured with the "Evergreen Award" at the Crystal Awards 2014 held on Sunday, July 20, 2014.

== Discography ==
- Amona Tete Maa Bo (1984)
- Abundant Grace ()
- Gboro Mi Ro (Re-Mix) Evergreen ()
- Agbara Olorun Ki I Baati ()
- Emi yio kokiki Re Vol 1
- Okan mi Bale Vol 2
- Emmanuel ti de Vol 3
- Amona tete mabo (1) Vol 4
- Eyin Omo Igbala Edide Vol 5
- Bami se Jesu Vol 6
- Bere Ohun Edun Okan re Vol 7
- Emi yio fiyin f'Oluwa Vol 8
- Amona tete mabo (2) Vol 9
- Agbara Olorun Ki I Baati Vol 10
- Gboro mi ro Vol 11
- Ilekun Anu Vol 12

== See also ==
- List of Nigerian gospel musicians
