= Eben (singer) =

Nigerian gospel singer and songwriter (born 1979)

- Born: Emmanuel Benjamin; September 9, 1979 (age 47); Lagos, Nigeria
- Genres: gospel; afrocentric pop
- Occupations: Gospel singer; Vocalist; Songwriter
- Years active: 2005–present
- Label: Hammer House of Rock

Emmanuel Benjamin (born 9 September 1979), known professionally as Eben is a Nigerian gospel singer, vocalist, and songwriter.

== Early life and education ==
Eben was born and raised in Lagos, Nigeria, the fifth of six children. He is from a Christian family and attended Orile Primary School, and Community Grammar School, Orile, Lagos.

== Career ==
In 1997, Eben started his singing career and was mentored by his elder brother as a rapper but he later discovered his talent in singing and became a gospel singer. In 2005, as a gospel singer, Eben became popular after his first big public appearance, at a youth conference organized by Pastor Chris where "Imarama" was first heard.

In 2006, Eben was a member of Christ Embassy founded by Pastor Chris Oyakhilome. In 2007, Eben released his first album, "On the Rock", which includes songs like “Imaranma”, ”God Dey”, ”Iwo Nikan”, "I Don Hammer", and other tracks. In 2010, he released a follow-up album, “Phenomenon”, which included songs like "Supper Man", "Imele Papa", "Siya Nma" and several other tracks. In 2013, Eben released another album titled “Justified”, which included songs like “You Alone Are Worthy”, "Onye Nwem", "How I Love You", "For Ever" and "All The Way". Eben also has a record label called Hammer House of Rock, with a business arm called the Hammer House Ventures, which specializes in video and music production, event management and interior decoration. And also another album titled "Magnified", with songs like “Stayed On You”, "Everything", "Idi Nma", "Lifted Hands" and other worship songs. Eben went viral after he released a song titled “Victory”.

On 15 September 2019, Eben host a live concert called Joyful Noise 2019 which featured top gospel musicians and also popular American musicians Bob Fitts and Phil Thompson.

== Discography ==
=== Studio albums ===
- On the Rock (2007)
- Phenomenon (2010)
- Justified (2013)
- Victory (2017)
- Magnified

== Awards and nominations ==
- In 2012, he won the PBO Musical Video Awards
- ‘Best Male Artiste’ Africa gospel Music Awards UK
- Best Male Artiste at the National Gospel Awards Nigeria
- Best Gospel Video Award at the Nigerian Music Awards
- Best Gospel Video ‘NMVA’
- In the year 2013, he won the Best West Africa award at the Africa Gospel Music Awards
- in 2014, he won the Album of the Year at the Crystal Awards
- Male Vocalist of the year at the LIMA AWARDS (2020)
- Songwriter of the Year at the LIMA AWARDS (2020)

== Personal life ==
On 30 November 2013, Eben married Jahdiel (Grace Okoduwa), his fellow gospel singer. In December 2013, Eben and Jahdiel had a white wedding and was joined in holy matrimony by Pastor Chris Oyakhilome of Christ Embassy. They are blessed with 2 children.
