= Gaise Baba =

Nigerian musician (born 1986)

- Born: Akinade Ibuoye; August 5, 1986 (age 40); Ile-Ife, Nigeria
- Occupations: Singer, songwriter, author, festival curator, culture architect
- Years active: 2010–present
- Spouse: Funto Ibuoye
- Musical career
- Origin: Okemesi-Ekiti, Nigeria
- Genres: AfroGospel
- Years active: 2010–present
- Label: Independent

Gaise Baba (born 5 August 1986 as Akinade Ibuoye) is a Nigerian singer, songwriter, and culture architect. His music blends Gospel music with Afrobeats, and urban contemporary styles.

== Early life and education ==
Gaise Baba studied Economics at Obafemi Awolowo University and later completed a program in Music Business at Berklee College of Music.

== Career ==
Gaise Baba released his debut album, Gaisebaba, in 2011. The album featured lyrics in English, Yoruba, and Nigerian Pidgin, and introduced his fusion-based style with Afrobeat and gospel influences. His second album, A Decade After, was released in 2022 and has been described as more reflective, focusing on personal and social themes.

In interviews, he has emphasized the importance of making faith-based music that resonates with younger, urban audiences. He has performed at venues across Nigeria and internationally, including a concert in Kigali, Rwanda as well as in London, Leicester, Manchester & Birmingham, United Kingdom

Gaise Baba made his acting debut in Undersiege, a musical produced by Mount Zion Film Productions in 2025. The musical also featured Greatman Takit and Mike Abdul

== Discography ==
=== Studio albums ===
- Gaisebaba (2011)
- A Decade After (2022)

=== Live albums ===
- Live in Lagos (2023)

=== Extended plays (EPs) ===
- Logo (The EP) (2020)
- Elijah Level EP (2023)

=== Singles ===
- "Movie Song" (2011)
- "Follow Follow" (2011)
- "Awa O Tush Oh" (2012)
- "Dobale" (2012)
- "Little Drops" (2013)
- "Gbagbe Oshi" (2015)
- "Work in Progress" featuring J Lyricist (2015)
- "Titilai" (2015)
- "Womina" (2017)
- "Holy Sauce" featuring Angeloh, Tobi Toun, Oluwanifise & Manolo (2018)
- "Logo"(2019)
- "Logo Reimagined (2020)
- Elijah Level Remix featuring Limoblaze (2023)
- "Particularly" featuring Tope Alabi (2024)
- "No Turning Back" (2024)
- "No Turning Back II" featuring Lawrence Oyor (2025)
- "We Outside" (2025)

== Projects and initiatives ==
Gaise Baba founded the LightOut High School Initiative in 2017. The project combines music, lectures, and creative sessions aimed at secondary school students. It promotes education, positive values, and civic responsibility.

In 2024, the initiative partnered with the German Consulate in Lagos and private sector actors to organize recycling and climate action programs in schools.

Gaise Baba is also the creator of the Aramanda Festival, an arts and music event that features faith-based music, spoken word, and cultural performances.

He hosts the Blackflame Podcast, where he and guests discuss African identity, spirituality, and social issues.

== Recognition ==
In 2018 and 2020, Gaise Baba was named on the Church100 list by YNaija, which recognizes influential figures in Nigerian Christian ministry.

In 2013, he was honored as a Cultural Ambassador by the Government of Ekiti State for his contributions to music and youth development.
