= Rozey =

Rozey also known as Rose Adjahore Esiso, is a Nigerian Christian gospel singer and is also a member of Believers Love World also known as Christ Embassy.

== Early life ==
Rozey's late father, who was a dental surgeon, played a role in her music life as a source of encouragement. His motivation encouraged her to sing at a very young age. Her involvement in singing activities in her secondary and tertiary education led her to pursue a career in music. Born and bred in Delta State, she was raised by her mother's family as both her parents died early in her life.

== Music and discography ==
In 2016, Rozy performed "Kinging" to a large crowd in collaboration with other artists such as CSO, her producer Kelly Lyon, and Provabs.

Her debut album, Enthroned, was released in November 2018. Singles from the album such as "Kinging", "I Shine", "Overflow", and "You alone" went on to receive large airplay. This album is said to be inspired by Pastor Chris Oyakhilome, the president of Believers Love world Nation.

In December 2019, the singer announced she would be releasing new music at the end of the year.
