= El Mafrex =

Nigerian musical artist (born 1984)

el Mafrex
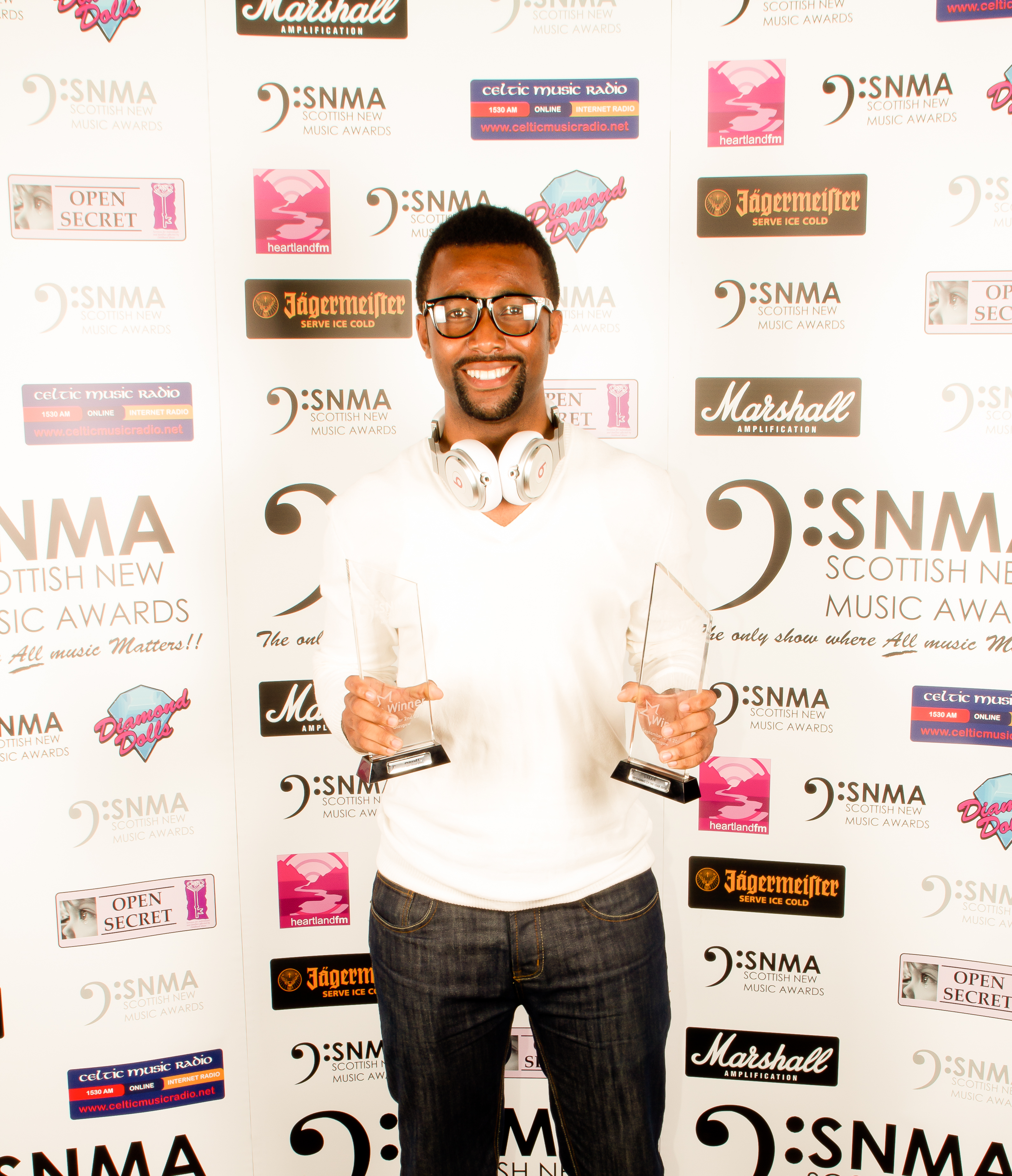
- el Mafrex at the 2012 Scottish New Music Awards in Glasgow, Scotland.

Background information
- Born: Mfreke Obong Ibanga; 14 May 1984 (age 42); Nigeria
- Origin: Nigeria; Edinburgh, Scotland, United Kingdom
- Genres: Afrobeat, Christian hip hop, R&B, ragga, urban contemporary gospel
- Occupation: Singer-songwriter
- Instruments: Vocals, drums and keyboard
- Years active: Since 2004; 22 years ago
- Label: 316 Muzik Factory
- Website: elmafrex.com

El Mafrex (born Mfreke Obong Ibanga; 14 May 1984) is a Nigerian-born, urban gospel singer-songwriter based in Edinburgh, Scotland.

He was nominated for Best Gospel Act consecutively at the 2012 and 2013 editions of the (MOBO) Music of Black Origin Awards. He won Artiste of the year and Urban Recording of the year at the 2012 Scottish New Music Awards, making him the first black man to win the SNMA.

His song, "Jehovah", which features Christian rock band Royal Foundlings had more than 500,000 hits in the first five months of its release on YouTube. He released "That Man from Galilee" in the first quarter of 2013, which debuted at no 49 on the iTunes UK Chart for Gospel and had over a million hits on YouTube in its first 6 months.

On 30 September 2012, he was featured in the Sunday Mail.

He was nominated for the Season 8 of The Future Awards Africa on 10 July 2013.

== Early life and education ==
He was born in Nigeria and educated at the Nigerian Military School in Zaria, Kaduna State.

He graduated in 2006 from the University of Uyo, Akwa Ibom State, where he studied physics and majored in electronics. In 2010, he obtained a master's degree in information-systems development from the Edinburgh Napier University.

== Career ==
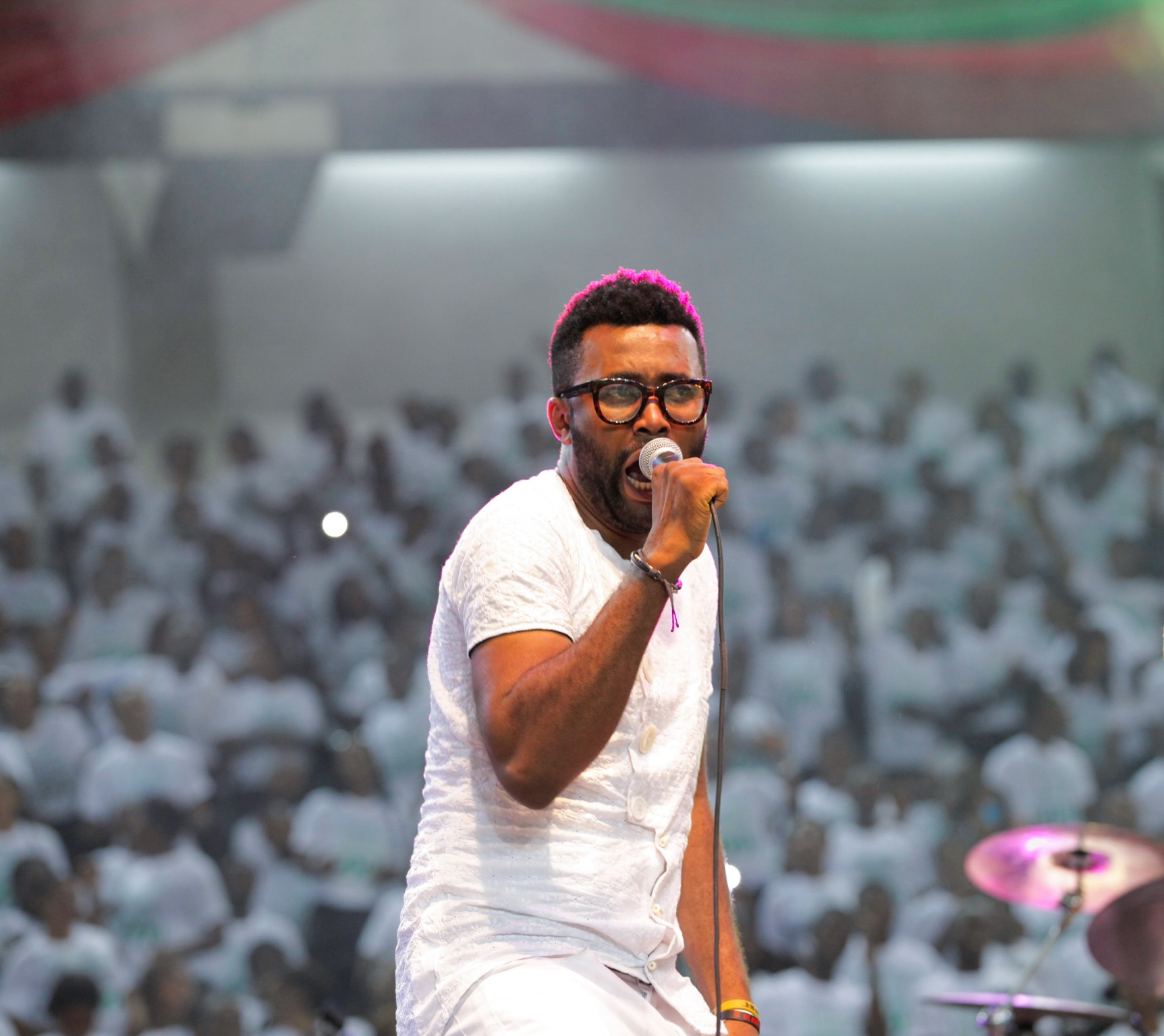
el Mafrex ministering during the 2014 AKSG Carol night at Ibom International Stadium, Uyo, Nigeria.

In 2001, El Mafrex started a boy band, M.O.D. (Men of Destiny), and was the lead vocalist of the five-man group. The band toured and played shows in Nigeria, especially in its south-south region before later expanding from a boy band to a family project. The family project gave birth to the Destiny Kids and MOD dancers.

While in the University of Uyo, he formed another boy band, Da Grooves, made up of Louis and GeePee. Together they played gigs on campus and its environs.

At the end of 2004, he left the band to start his own solo career, which he called the "el MAFREX" project. He was voted Artiste of the year in 2005 by the SUG of University of Uyo, and his songs "Rhythm in the Air" and "Esio Mkpo" were played on radio and television stations in Nigeria. "Rhythm in the Air" won song of the month, on the then Cosmo FM Enugu.

On 21 December 2013, el Mafrex headlined the Sixth edition of the Akwa Ibom State Government Christmas Carol (9999 Carol SIngers) night with other International gospel artists like Israel Houghton, South African gospel legend Lionel Peterson and Nigerian Gospel acts like Frank Edwards, Aity Dennis, Freke' and Nathaniel Bassey. He led a Reggae praise session in the Guinness book of world records listed event at the Uyo Township Stadium.

=== STV interview ===
In November 2012, he was interviewed by Scottish television news STV, where he talked about his music and recent MOBO Awards nomination.

=== Business interest ===
El Mafrex has other interests besides music as he prepares to launch his own line of designers eyeglasses. He told The Scotsman that he had his own personal sunglasses customized specially for himself and has since received compliments from many people who are interested in acquiring them, which has propelled him towards the direction of having a line for his sunglasses. The name of the line would be 3:16 derived from the Bible verse, John 3:16.

=== Singles ===
Year	Title
2006	"Rhythm in the Air"
2010	"Ibagaba"
2011	"Thank You"
2012	"Jehovah"
2012	"No Denying"
2012	"Bounce"
2012	"Your Word"
2013	"Since I be Pikin"
2013	"Oh that men will praise the Lord"
2013	"That Man from Galilee"

=== Awards and nominations ===
Year	Category	Award	Result
2012	Scottish New Music Awards	Artiste of the Year	Won
2012	Scottish New Music Awards	Urban Recording of the Year	Won
2012	Scottish New Music Awards	Video of the year	Nominated
2012	MOBO Awards	Best Gospel Act 2012	Nominated
2013	The Future Awards Africa	Entertainment Talent	Nominated
2013	MOBO Awards	Best Gospel Act 2013	Nominated
2016	Scepters Award	Best Album	Pending

== See also ==
- List of Christian hip hop and rap artists
- List of Nigerian gospel musicians
- List of Edinburgh people
- List of gospel musicians
- List of Nigerians
- List of R&B musicians
- List of reggae musicians
- List of Scottish musicians
- List of singer-songwriters
- Music of Nigeria
- Music of Scotland
