= Efe Afe =

Nigerian politician (born 1967)

Efe Afe is a Nigerian politician. He is a member representing Okpe/Sapele/Uvwie Federal Constituency in the House of Representatives.

== Early life ==
Efe Afe was born in 1967 and hails from Delta State.

== Political career ==
He served as a member of the Delta State House of Assembly from 1999 to 2011. In 2019 he was elected under the platform of the Peoples Democratic Party (PDP) as member representing Okpe/Sapele/Uvwie Federal Constituency.
