= Efe Murad =

Turkish poet, translator and historian

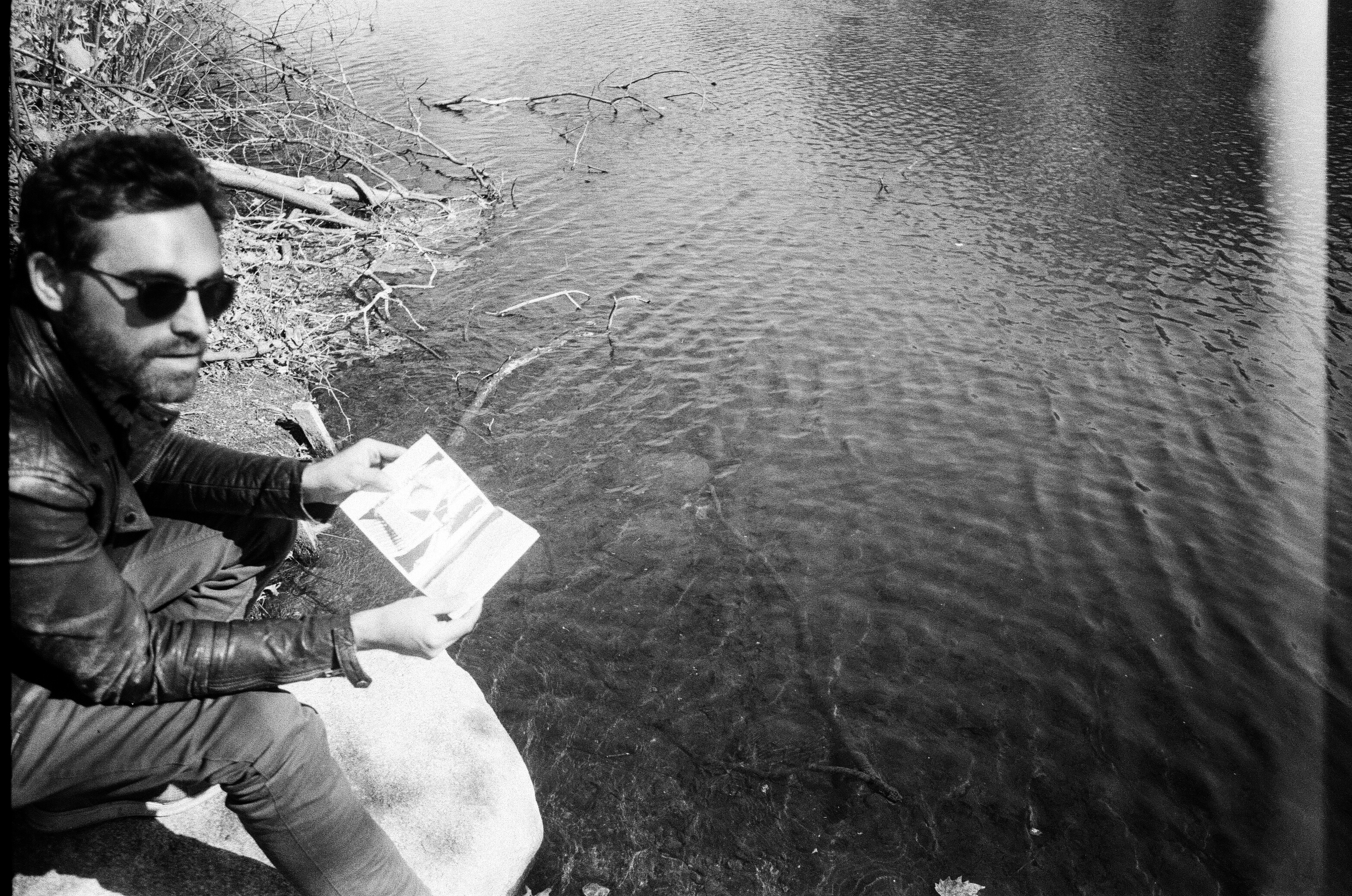
- Efe Murad (Cambridge, MA, 2021)
- Born: Efe Murat Balıkçıoğlu; Istanbul, Turkey
- Education: Princeton University; Harvard University
- Occupations: Poet, professor

Efe Murad is a Turkish poet, translator, and historian. He is currently Assistant Professor at Ca' Foscari University of Venice and Associate at Harvard University’s Center for Middle Eastern Studies. He has previously taught at Harvard University, Wellesley College, and New York University. He is scheduled to join Trinity College Dublin in July 2027 as Yunus Emre Assistant Professor in Turkish Cultural History.

== Biography ==
Born and raised in Istanbul, Turkey, Efe Murad studied philosophy at Princeton University and completed his PhD in Ottoman history and Arabic philosophy at Harvard University. Together with Cem Kurtuluş, he wrote the Matter-Poetry Manifesto in 2004. During his senior year at Robert College, he received the gold medal in the International Philosophy Olympiad, which was organized in Cosenza, Italy in 2006.

He is the author of six books of poetry and the translator of ten more, including the first complete translation of Ezra Pound’s Cantos into Turkish; volumes by the American poets Susan Howe, Lyn Hejinian, Jack Spicer, Ron Padgett-Tom Clark, and C. K. Williams, the German author Thomas Bernhard, the Zimbabwean writer Dambudzo Marechera, as well as the Iranian poets Mahmoud Mosharraf Azad Tehrani and Fereydoon Moshiri. Together with the American poet and translator Sidney Wade, he co-translated a collection of poems by the Turkish modernist Melih Cevdet Anday under the title Silent Stones (Talisman Press, 2017), which was awarded "the Meral Divitçi Prize for Turkish Poetry in Translation." His poems, writings, reviews, and translations in English have appeared in a wide range of journals including The American Reader, Denver Quarterly, Guernica, Critical Flame, Second Factory, The Markaz Review, Words Without Borders, Asymptote, Jacket2, and Two Lines, and exhibitions including the 13th Istanbul Biennial. In 2021, he published a volume of memoiristic essays, The Pleasures of Empty Lots, which concerns the culture of the flaneur and the rise of authoritarianism in his hometown Istanbul. His bilingual book of poetry, Breaking of Symmetry/Simetrinin Kırılması, a collaboration with the Harvard University quantum physics researcher Dr. Sina Zeytinoğlu and poet-artist Sevinç Çalhanoğlu came out in a special edition of 400, funded by the European Union Grant Scheme for Common Cultural Heritage, as well as Turkey's Aşina Project. According to the description included in the book, Murad recorded various conversations with Dr. Zeytinoğlu about his research on symmetry breakings and phase transitions. Having transcribed these recorded conversations, Murad chiseled Dr. Zeytinoğlu's words into poetry by mixing them with corresponding contexts in Islamic philosophy and Sufism.

A scholar of Islamic history and philosophy, he taught history, religion, and writing at Wellesley College for four years, and he served as a faculty fellow in Islamic history at New York University’s Department of Middle Eastern and Islamic Studies from 2023 to 2024. Since 2025, he has served as Assistant Professor in the Department of Philosophy and Cultural Heritage at Ca' Foscari University of Venice, where he researches the reception of Aristotelian natural philosophy in postclassical Islamic intellectual traditions. Murad translates from several languages, and his poetry melds post-punk lyrics and experimental poetics with Islamic philosophy and mysticism, incorporating found texts, soundscapes, and fragments of archival material.

== Books in English ==
- Verifying the Truth on Their Own Terms Ottoman Philosophical Culture and the Court Debate Between Zeyrek (d. 903/1497-98 [?]) and Ḫocazāde (d. 893/1488) (Edizioni Ca’ Foscari, 2023) ISBN 978-88-6969-644-2.
- Breaking of Symmetry/Simetrinin Kırılması, in collaboration w/ Sina Zeytinoğlu, Sevinç Çalhanoğlu, and translator Fahri Öz (European Union Grant Scheme for Common Cultural Heritage, 2022) ISBN 978-60571523-3-6.
- The Pleasures of Empty Lots (Bored Wolves Press, 2021) ISBN 978-83-954871-6-3.
- Silent Stones, co-trans. w/ Sidney Wade (Talisman House, 2017) ISBN 978-1584981251.

== Poems in English Translation ==
- "Encirclings" (trans. Murat Nemet-Nejat from "An Organ of Quality") published in an anthology of Mediterranean poets Circle Surface Sun: From Somewhere in the Mediterranean, eds. Irena Eden & Stijn Lernout (Schlebrügge.Editor, 2020) ISBN 978-3-903172-50-0.
