= Samsong (gospel musician) =

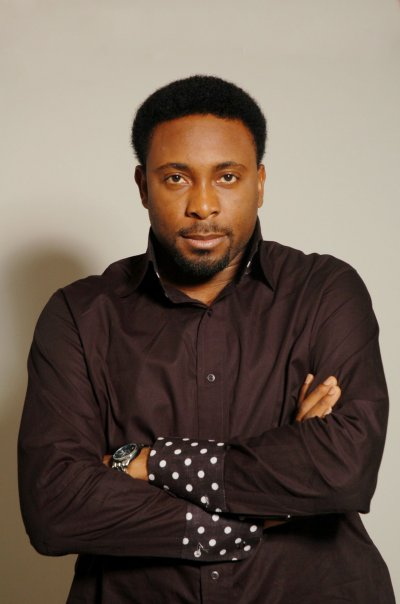

Background information
- Born: Samson Uche Mogekwu; November 30, 1974 (age 51)
- Origin: Delta State, Nigeria
- Genres: Contemporary gospel, R&B
- Occupations: Singer, songwriter, minister
- Instrument: Vocals
- Years active: 1990–present
- Label: Boogie Down Concept
- Formerly of: Praise Creation
- Website: samsongonline.com

Samson Uche Mogekwu, known as Samsong, is a Nigerian gospel artist, based in Abuja, the federal capital territory of Nigeria.

== Early life and education ==
Samson Uche Mogekwu was born on November 30, 1974, in Delta State, southern region of Nigeria. He began singing while in high school, where he also took on the name Samsong. He attended Ambrose Alli University, Ekpoma, Edo State, majoring in Accounting.

== Career ==
Samsong formed a quartet known as Praise Creation. They were signed to Ivory Music Label, and released their debut album, Best of Life, in 1996.

The group subsequently broke up, and Samsong became a solo artist, releasing his debut album, Count Your Blessings, in 2002. The album won The Psalmist Award that same year.

His second album Still Counting was released in 2004. He won the "Best Male Vocalist of the Year" Award at Today's Music Award in 2004, and "Best Male Vocalist of The Year" Award in 2005 at The Amen Awards. At the Vigoma Awards in 2005, he received the "Best Video of The Year" Award. His third release, The World of My Dreams, was issued in 2007, featuring a remake of the well-known hit "One Love" by Onyeka Onwenu, with whom he performed the song as a duet. The album also featured a duet with Styl-Plus entitled "Live Right". He won the Grace Honorary Award for Excellence, that same year.

In 2008, he was nominated for the award of "Best Gospel Artist" at the Nigerian Entertainment Awards (NEA) in New York City. He embarked on an international tour to promote his album, including South Africa, the United Kingdom and Germany. In Germany, he recorded and performed with German gospel producer Chris Lass.

His most recent headlining tour was in August 2009. He toured the island of Seychelles, where he was received by Vice President Joseph Belmont.

== Discography ==
- Best of Life (with Praise Creation) (1996)
- Count Your Blessings (2002)
- Still Counting (2004)
- The World of My Dreams (2007)
- Church Boy (2010)
- On Top of The World (2015)

== See also ==
- List of Igbo people
- List of Nigerian gospel musicians
- List of Nigerian musicians
