= Christ Embassy =

Church and mission group based in Nigeria

- Classification: Evangelicalism
- Theology: Neo-charismatic movement
- Region: World
- Headquarters: Lagos, Lagos State, Nigeria
- Founder: Chris Oyakhilome
- Origin: 1987
- Official website: www.christembassy.org

Christ Embassy (also known as LoveWorld Kingdom or Believers' Loveworld) is a megachurch and Christian denomination founded in 1987 by Chris Oyakhilome.

The denomination, with its headquarters in Lagos, has since become a global network of churches. By 2019 it had 145 branches on five continents, with ministries in Canada, Ghana, Nigeria, South Africa, the United States, and the United Kingdom.

== History ==
The church started with a prayer group led by Chris Oyakhilome, at Ambrose Alli University, Ekpoma, while he was studying architecture in 1987. The church celebrated its 30th anniversary in November 2017.

Christ Embassy is an independent church of pentecostal persuasion, formerly known as Believers' Love World Incorporated. It follows an American megachurch model of large auditoria and focuses on healing by the supernatural power of the Holy Spirit. During an event, a segment where past and present testimonies were shared, with reports of recoveries from conditions including stomach disorders, tumours, and long-standing pain. Specific individuals from the UAE, Congo, Qatar, and Cyprus were spotlighted during the testimony session, including a woman who claimed a breast lump of eight years vanished during the event. Congregational spaces are reserved for worship and not for community engagement work, and has been criticised for "opulence amid poverty". Oyakhilome's teaching is that prosperity is a blessing of God. This prosperity theology encourages followers to give money as seeds, teaching that those who donate to his ministry will also be rewarded with wealth and health and escape poverty. He has responded to criticism of this aspect of his ministry, stating that, "True prosperity comes from spiritual growth and adherence to God's principles, not mere material accumulation."

Several other ministries around the world participate in its programs and conferences including the International Pastors and Partners Conference (IPPC), which is held every November in Lagos, Nigeria; the International Cell Leaders' Conference (ICLC), which is held in the middle of the year; the International School of Ministry, and the Healing School.

=== United Kingdom ===
Christ Embassy is a registered charity in the UK, established in 1996. In July 2013, the Charity Commission launched an inquiry regarding the use of charitable funds; however, inspections of records did not resolve concerns about its financial management, and in August 2014, the Charity Commission appointed an interim manager to run the charity until 2016. British tax authorities withheld £2.8 million in Gift Aid tax refunds from the charity as they were concerned not all of the charity's income was being spent for charitable purposes.

=== Australia ===
A branch of the Christ Embassy Church in Sydney was ordered to close for seven days in August 2021 after an illegal in-person service was conducted there during a COVID-19 lockdown. The service was attended by 60 people. The pastor of the church had previously discouraged his followers from receiving COVID-19 vaccines.

== LoveWorld television stations ==
Christ Embassy runs seven TV channels, including LoveWorld TV, LoveWorld SAT, LoveWorld Plus, LoveWorld UK, LoveWorld Nigeria, LoveWorld India, and LoveWorld USA. LoveWorld USA is run in partnership with Pastor Benny Hinn, who appears in many programs on the channel.

=== LoveWorld UK ===
Oyakhilome's UK TV channel was sanctioned twice for sharing misinformation about COVID-19, including suggesting that Covid was planned and vaccines included manipulative nanochips.

=== LoveWorld USA ===
LoveWorld USA was an American Christian cable television network launched by Chris Oyakhilome and Benny Hinn in 2017. It was available on Charter Spectrum and DirecTV as well as other small cable operators in the U.S. Currently, LoveWorld USA has stopped cable broadcasting and is no longer available on DirectTV or Charter Spectrum, but is still available for streaming on its website.

== Loveworld Publications ==
Oyakhilome's publishing house, Loveworld Publications, publishes his books, including ‘Rhapsody of Realities,’ a monthly Christian devotional that sells 2 million copies.

Christ Embassy also has a book publishing firm called LoveWorld Publishing Ministry.

== Loveworld Records ==
Loveworld Records was an independent record label established by Oyakhilome with the aim of discovering and developing gospel artists. Founded in 2009, the record label groomed and produced notable gospel musicians including Sinach, Frank Edwards, Joe Praize; among others.

== See also ==
- Rozey
