= Sunmisola Agbebi =

Sunmisola Agbebi Okeleye
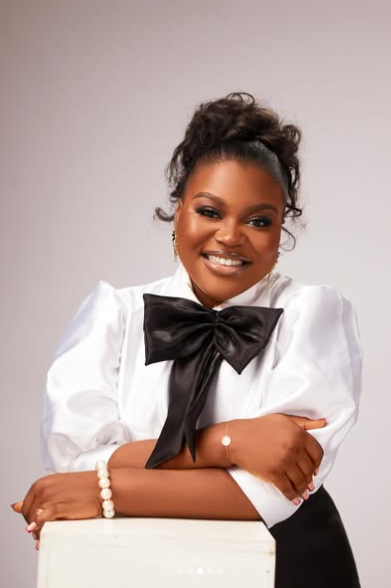

Background information
- Born: Sunmisola Elizabeth Agbebi; May 2, 1998 (age 28); Lagos State, Nigeria
- Genres: Contemporary worship; contemporary gospel
- Occupations: Singer; songwriter
- Instrument: Vocals
- Years active: 2020–present
- Spouse: Yinka Okeleye (Married 2023 – present)
- Website: https://sunmisola.com

Sunmisola Elizabeth Agbebi Okeleye, well known as Sunmisola Agbebi, is a Nigerian gospel singer, songwriter, and worship leader. She is popularly known for her covers on gospel songs.

== Early life ==
Sunmisola Agbebi was born on 2 May 1998 to Mr. & Mrs. Kayode Agbebi in Lagos State, Nigeria.

== Music career ==
Sunmisola Agbebi had her first music performance at the age of four. In 2023, she released "B'ola" and "My Daddy, My Daddy" featuring Lawrence Oyor. She collaborates with several artists and participates in spontaneous worship sessions with her husband, Yinka. In 2017, she won the Ikorodu Radio Music Challenge.

In October 2022, Agbebi organized a live recording music concert titled AIIIH ("As It Is In Heaven") at the Charis Event Center, Lagos State. At the concert, she released a modified version of the song "My Daddy My Daddy" featuring its original singer, Lawrence Oyor.

In November 2022, she was invited to perform "The Garden of Our Heart" at the Dubai Expo alongside Grammy award winner A. R. Rahman and the Firduas Orchestra.

In December 2022, she performed at an annual Christmas concert with musician Joe Mettle. In April 2023, she was featured by Folabi Nuel on the song "He's Alive".

== Personal life ==
On 2 March 2023, Agbebi got engaged to fellow gospel singer, Yinka Okeleye in an enclosed private ceremony. Their marriage introduction took place on 5 March 2023 at her residence in Lagos State, Nigeria, and they were married on 3 June 2023.

== Discography ==
=== Singles ===
As a lead artist
Title	Date of release	Album
Amazing	November 2020	Non-album single
Koseunti	February 2022	Non-album single
B'Ola (Honour)	May 2023	Non-album single
Oba Ni (He is King)	December 2023	Non album single
Aileyipada (Unchangeable)	March 2024	Non album single.
Holy spirit	November 2024	Non album single.
Awamaridi	march 2025	Non album single.

=== Live performances ===
- The Garden of our heart with A R Rahman and Firduas Orchestra (2022)
- My Daddy My Daddy featuring Pastor Lawrence Oyor (2022)
- B'Ola Remix featuring Shola Allyson (2023)
- Oba Ni featuring Nosa Omoregie (2023)

=== Features ===
As a featured artiste
Title	Date of release	Details
Most Holy One (TY Bello and Sunmisola Agbebi)	August 2022	Format: Streaming, Digital Download
He's Alive (Folabi Nuel featuring Sunmisola Agbebi)	April 2023	Format: Streaming, Digital Download
Closer than close (Ty bello ft Sunmisola Agbebi)	May 2023	Format: Streaming, Digital Download
Mercy (Moses Bliss) featuring Sunmisola Agbebi and Pastor Jerry Eze)	August 2023	Format: Streaming, Digital Download
Mu na chi mu so remix (Chee ft Sunmisola Agbebi)	September 2023	Format: Streaming, Digital Download
All Glory (Tim Godffery, fearless community ft Sunmisola Agbebi)	October 2023	Format: Streaming, Digital Download
Never seen (Yadah ft Sunmisola Agbebi)	April 2024	Format: Streaming, Digital Download
Oba Awon Oba (Joe Mettle ft Sunmisola Agbebi)	June 2024	Format: Streaming, Digital Download
Lion of Judah ( Mr M & Revelation ft Sunmisola Agbebi).	October 2024	Format: streaming, digital Download.
Shekinah (pastor iren Emmanuel ft Sunmisola Agbebi).	October 2024	Format: Streaming, Digital Download.

== Achievements ==
In November 2022, Sunmisola Agbebi was announced as one of the artistes to perform at the African All-Star US Tour, a gospel music concert held in cities around the U.S.

== Awards and nominations ==
Year	Award	Category	Result	Ref
2024	Kingdom Achievers Awards 2024	ARTIST OF THE YEAR - FEMALE	Nominated	
