= Nosa (musician) =

- Born: Nosakhare Shadrack Omoregie; 26 February 1981 (age 45); Edo State, Nigeria
- Genres: CCM, contemporary worship music, gospel
- Occupations: Singer-songwriter, performer, worship leader, musician, producer
- Instruments: Vocals, piano, guitar
- Years active: 2009–present
- Labels: Chocolate City; Salt Music
- Website: saltmusic.ng

Nosakhare Shadrack Omoregie, professionally known as Nosa, is a Nigerian recording artist, singer, songwriter and performer. He is currently signed to Warner Music Group African partner, Chocolate City.

== Early life and education ==
Nosakhare Shadrack Omoregie was born on 26 February 1981, a native of Benin City, Edo State. He started his singing journey in the children's choir in his church. Omoregie studied engineering at the University of Benin (UNIBEN) in his home state of Edo.

== Career ==
Nosa's source of joy as a growing child was in music and attending church, where he began exploring his developing talents. He is majorly influenced by gospel singers like Fred Hammond and Kim Burrell and the noted R&B group Boyz II Men. He later grew to love the sound of jazz and soul music and the simplicity of rock. He is also greatly influenced by Afro-Highlife, particularly music from Sonny Okosun, Christy Essien-Igbokwe, King Sunny Adé and Onyeka Onwenu, thus venturing from a wide array of childhood career fantasies of becoming an engineer, military man, or footballer to becoming a music producer and singer.

Nosa has described his musical aim as wanting 'to create a bridge between music genres while making sure the gospel aspect of it is on a fore-front platform just as the other genres', i.e. a unique merger of sorts: creatively superimposing a soul tune on a high-life beat, writing a high-life verse with a rock-inspired chorus, or singing Nigerian Pidgin English with an R&B flavor, all while endeavouring to give an inspirational and uplifting message to his listeners.

=== Music career and Open Doors ===
Nosa was signed to Chocolate City in 2012. On 11 November 2009, Nosa released his debut single "Always Pray for You", under the Chocolate City label His debut studio album, Open Doors, was released on 14 March 2014 and supported by the singles "Always Pray for You", "Why You Love Me" and "Always on My Mind".

In May 2014, he partnered with Nokia for the release of his song "Love is Calling". On 16 May 2014, The Punch newspaper reported that Nosa signed an endorsement deal with Unilever. On 26 February 2020, which coincided with his birthday, Nosa founded his record label, Salt Music.

== Discography ==
=== Albums ===
- Open Doors (2014)

=== Singles ===
As lead artist
Year	Title	Album
2009 / 2013	"Always Pray for You"	Open Doors
2013	"Why You Love Me"	Open Doors
2014	"Always on My Mind"	Open Doors
2016	"I Am Blessed"	
2016	"God Is Good"	
2017	"Most High" (feat. Nathaniel Bassey)	
2018	"We Will Arise" (feat. LCGC)	
2019	"Na Your Way" (feat. Mairo Ese)	
2020	"Dry Bones"	
Promotional singles
2014	"Always on My Mind (Remix)" (Nosa featuring MI)	Non Album Singles
As featured artist
2011	"Standing" (Zee featuring Nosa)	Non-album single
2013	"New Day" (Masterkraft featuring Frank Edwards, Nosa)	Non-album single
2014	"Fly Like The Eagles" (Ice Prince featuring Dammy Krane, Sasha P, Seyi Shay)	Non-album single

== Awards and nominations ==
Year	Awards ceremony	Award description(s)	Recipient(s)	Results	Ref
2013	African Gospel Awards	Song of the Year	"Always Pray for You"	Nominated	
2014	African Gospel Awards	Song of the Year	"Why You Love Me"	Nominated	
2014	Crystal Gospel Awards	Song of the Year	"Why You Love Me"	Nominated	
2014	Mega Awards	Song of the Year	"Always Pray for You"	Won	
2014	YadaMag Readers' Choice Awards	Artiste of the Year	Nosa	Won	
2014	Gospel Touch Music Awards	African Artiste of the Year	Nosa	Won	

== See also ==
- List of Nigerian musicians
- List of Nigerian gospel musicians
