= Nigerian gospel =

Gospel songs are a kind of motivational Christian music that has become a major part of Nigerian music. In the 1960s the Evangelical Church of West Africa Choir was popular, and in the early 1970s Bola Aare, Ebenezer Obey and later, Panam Percy Paul, Onyeka Onwenu, Tope Alabi, and Kefee were notable. Also, in the early 1970s and 1980s Arch Bishop Benson Idahosa's choir, The Christian Redeemed Voices were known for their gospel sound. Idahosa would purchase instruments for the choir.

A number of gospel artists have released notable albums such as TY Bello and Samsong among others. In 2012, el Mafrex was nominated for the 2012 MOBO Awards.

== Origin of Nigerian gospel songs ==
The act of singing gospel songs is a practice that was brought into Nigeria about late 15th century, by Portuguese Catholic who had arrived Benin city at this time for missionary work. These songs were mostly rendered then during Church worship service. They took the form of monophonic liturgy like the Gregorian chant - these are songs without polyphony and not written (rendered in parts) but having only one line of melody. By mid-19th century, missionary activities (which had diminished earlier) had revived in Nigeria. This time around, it was championed by the Church Missionary Society (CMS), which is owned and funded by the Church of England (Anglican Communion). At this time, the activities of CMS centered mostly around South-west, Nigeria. The CMS introduced a different genre of Church music that involved congregational singing of hymns led by a choir.

He was the first known Nigerian to record gospel songs was a product of the Anglican Communion’s CMS. He is the late Reverend Josiah Jesse Ransome-Kuti.

=== Reverend Josiah Jesse Ransome-Kuti ===
Revd. Ransome-Kuti was a Christian music minister from Ogun State, Nigeria. His influence and inspiration are from the Anglican Church songs. He was baptized in the Anglican communion in 1859 at age four. He grew through the ranks in the Anglican Communion to become an established Minister of God; and in 1922 was ordained Canon of the Cathedral Church of Christ, Lagos.

In 1879 Ransome-Kuti took up a job as music teacher in CMS Girls college, Lagos, where he taught music for eight years. In the 1890s, as the Organist of St. Peter’s Church, Abeokuta, he began to compile the Anglican Communion hymns in Yoruba, and to compose other songs in Yoruba language. These songs gained him fame as he was said to have won more converts through singing, and therefore was described as “The singing minister”; whereas in other quarters, he has been described as “The revolutionary music minister”. In the year 1925 Revd. Ransome-Kuti recorded and released a 43 songs under Zonophone Records (now Warner Music Group), making him the first Nigerian to have recorded gospel songs.

=== Ikoli Harcourt Whyte ===
Another landmark in the birth of Nigeria gospel songs was in the person of the late Ikoli Harcourt Whyte. He was a leprosy patient. For 45 years (until his death in 1977 at the age of 72), he lived in a leprosy colony in Uzuakoli, Abia State, Nigeria. The colony was owned by the Methodist Church.

Harcourt Whyte was a member of his school choir, where he played flute and side drum but in 1919 at age 14, he was diagnosed with leprosy and expelled from school. At the leprosy colony, he devoted most of his time to studying the Bible and the Methodist hymn book, from where he drew inspiration for his songs. A huge source of encouragement for him was Rev. Dr. Frank Davey C.B.E. (Director of Methodist Leprosy Settlement at Uzuakoli from 1936 to 1959). Dr. Davey who himself was an ardent lover of music guided and supported Harcourt Whyte’s musical flair.

Though a Kalabari man from Abonema, Rivers State, his stay in Uzuakoli influenced him to write songs in Ibo language. He is referred to as "The father of Igbo church music". Between 1921 and 1977, he wrote over 200 songs. He raised a choir, which traveled and ministered around Nigeria. He performed for British dignitaries who visited Nigeria during the colonial era. He was invited to schools to teach music. He was the music teacher at Methodist Boys' High School in Uzuakoli.
