= Tope Alabi =

Nigerian singer (born 1970)

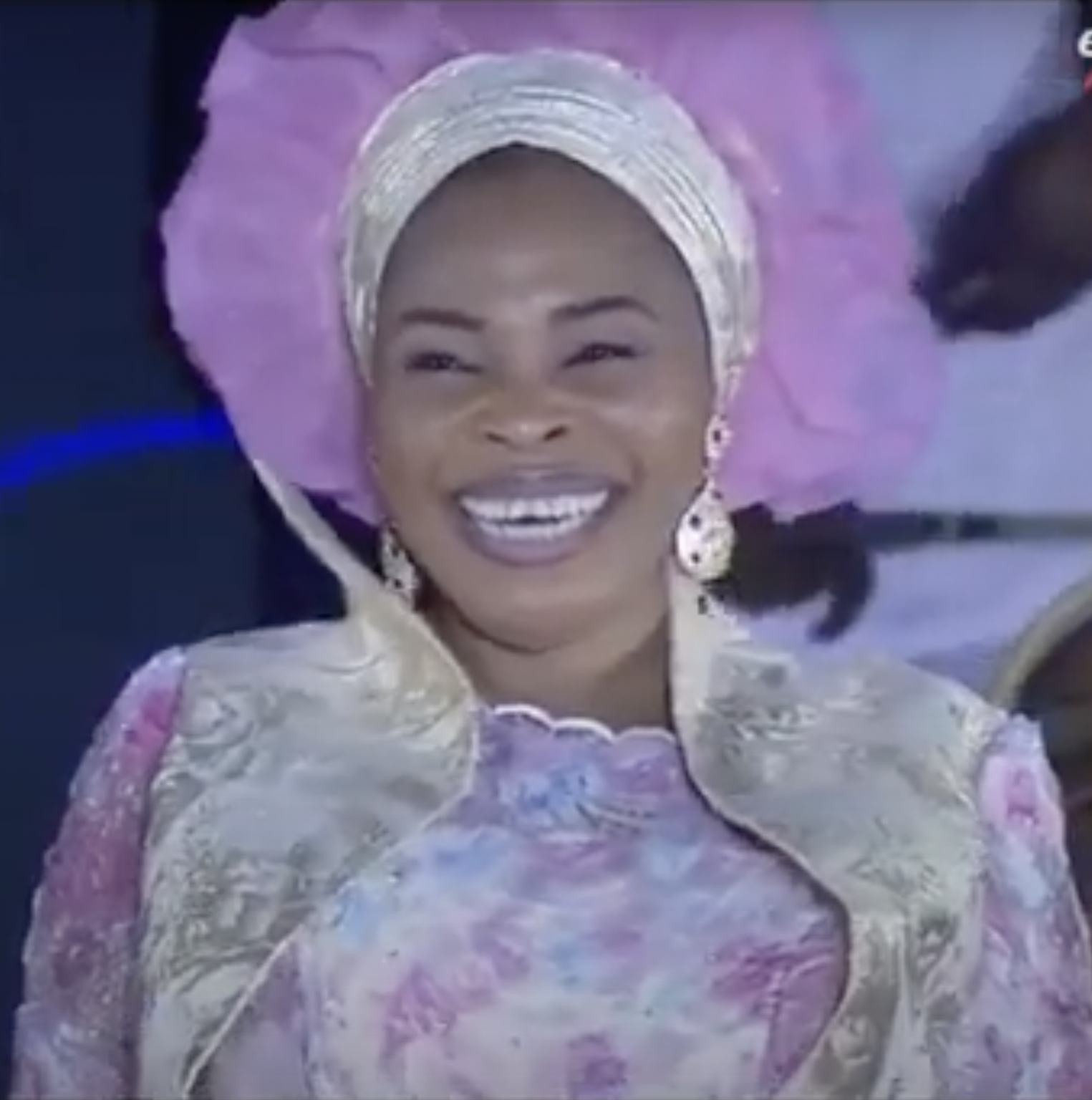
- Born: Patricia Temitope Obayomi; 27 October 1970 (age 56); Lagos, Nigeria
- Other names: Ore ti o Common; Agbo Jesu
- Education: The Polytechnic, Ibadan (HND); Akinyele Memorial High School
- Occupations: Actress; Gospel singer; businesswoman; songwriter; film music composer
- Spouse: Soji Alabi (m. 1998)
- Children: 2
- Musical career
- Origin: Yewa, Ogun State, Nigeria
- Genres: Gospel; Yoruba gospel
- Instruments: Vocals
- Years active: 1990s–present
- Label: Tope Alabi Gospel Vibes
- Website: officialtopealabi.com

Patricia Temitope Alabi (née Obayomi ; born 27 October 1970), better known as Tope Alabi , is a Nigerian gospel singer, composer, and actress. She is a significant figure in the Yoruba film industry, and has composed over 350 soundtracks. Alabi obtained a Higher National Diploma from The Polytechnic, Ibadan in 1990, and worked as a correspondent for NTA Ibadan. During her upbringing, she attended a Catholic Church and started singing in the choir when she was seven years old.

== Biography ==
Patricia Temitope Alabi was born on October 27, 1970, in Lagos, and is originally from Yewa, Imeko, in Ogun State, Nigeria. She is the only daughter of Joseph Akinyele Obayomi and Agnes Kehinde Obayomi (1947–2017 (Note: As metioned on her facebook page)). Alabi is of Yoruba descent. She grew up with her two brothers. According to Alabi, her mother wanted her to become a nun but decided against sending her to a convent.

Alabi began singing in a Catholic church choir at the age of seven. She has said that she discovered her calling through dreams. She was also interested in acting and comedy but chose to pursue music.

Alabi attended Akinyele Memorial High School in Ibadan and obtained her WAEC Certificate in 1986. Alabi became interested in acting while in secondary school. In Form Three, she joined the drama group Jacob, Papilolo and Aderupoko before moving to the Ishola Ogunshola drama group. She graduated from The Polytechnic, Ibadan, in 1990, where she obtained a Higher National Diploma in Mass Communication.

Alabi began her career in acting as a member of the Nigerian theatre group Jesters International. During this time she recorded soundtracks for Nollywood films, particularly those in the Yoruba-language film. Her compositions for Yoruba films gained recognition in the industry, and she became a sought-after composer of film soundtracks. She worked backstage, carrying costumes, before taking on acting roles. She later appeared in the 13-episode television series Koko Arugbo and the drama B’olohun o pani, where she played a princess.

In the 1990s, Alabi had a minor voice role in the Yoruba-language film Yemi In The Moon. produced by Yemi Ayebo. She also starred in the film Owo Agbara where she starred alongside Funso Craig.

In 1992, she released her first secular album, Ikoko Dudu. She then switched to gospel music, releasing her first gospel album, Baba Iwo Lakepe, in 1994, and her second, Ore ti o Common, in 2001. The title was inspired by a message about receiving an uncommon favour from God. Alabi contributed soundtracks to several home videos, including Solo Makinde (2000), My Stepmother and Toyin Tomato (2003). She has named gospel singers Demos Deniran and Bola Are as her mentors. The success of this song was followed by other notable releases, including Agbara Nla (2001), Angeli Mi (2007), and Yes and Amen (2018).

== Artistry ==
=== Style and influence ===
Alabi performs gospel music in Yoruba and English, often addressing subjects such as salvation, holiness and the power of God. A study of four of her songs noted changes in her music over time. Her earlier recordings had simpler arrangements and focused on religious themes, while some of her later songs featured faster tempos, more instruments and personal subject matter. She is also recognized for her live worship performances, which draw large audiences both in Nigeria and internationally.

== Personal life ==
Tope Alabi is married to Soji Alabi, her music producer. The couple has three children.

== Controversies ==
In September 2012, Alabi said in an interview that some pastors had made sexual advances towards her. She said that some of the men also supported her ministry, but that she had turned down their advances. She did not disclose their identities. In 2013, reports emerged of a dispute between Alabi and her former pastor, Prophet Elijah Ajanaku. Ajanaku accused her of repeatedly asking him to have sex with her, an allegation her husband denied. The two had reportedly fallen out a few months before Ajanaku's death in August 2013.

In 2021, Alabi commented on the song "Oniduro Mi" by another gospel musician Adeyinka Alaseyori. She questioned the use of the word "guarantor" to describe God, saying that God was more than that. Her comments drew criticism on social media.

== Discography ==
Studio albums

- Ore ti o Common (2001)
- Iwe Eri (2003)
- Agbara Re NI (2005)
- Agbara Olorun (2006)
- Angeli MI (2007)
- Kokoro Igbala (2008)
- Kabiosi (2010)
- Moriyanu
- Agbelebu (2011)
- Alagbara (2012)
- Agbelebu (2013)
- Oruko Tuntun (2015)
- Omo Jesu (2017)
- Yes & Amen (2018)
- Spirit of Light (with TY Bello) (2019)
- Olorun Nbe Funmi (Iseoluwa)
- Lowo Olorun Lowa (2020)
- Unless You Bless Me (2022)
- Igbowo Eda (2023)
- Oluwa Ni: The Spontaneous Worship (2024)
- Koni (2024)
- ÒRÒ (2025)

== Filmography ==
=== Film ===
Year	Title	Role	Notes
1993	Yemi in the Moon	Yemi	Film debut
2012	Pastor Keu	Actress	Home video
2013	Osan Ja	Actress	Home video
2020	Odi Idiwon	Actress	Mount Zion faith-based film
2023	The Weight	Lead role	Also executive producer
2024	Olorun Merinlokan	Actress	Directed by Oreofe Williams

=== Television ===
Year	Title	Role	Notes
—	Koko Arugbo	Unknown	13-episode television series
—	B’olohun o pani	Princess	Television drama

== Selected film scores ==
Tope Alabi has composed and performed soundtracks for over 1,000 indigenous Yoruba home videos and mainstream cinema releases.

Year	Title	Director	Studio(s)	Notes
2000	Solo Makinde			
—	Idariji			
—	Ayemi Ayemi			
2003	Toyin Tomato			
—	Elenini Amutorunwa			
—	Asiri Bibo			
—	Omo Laso			
—	Eso Lore Iwa			
—	Mowowa Aye			
2026	Mama Deola Wedding Story			

== Awards and nominations ==
Year	Association	Category	Nominated work	Result	Ref.
2015	Nigeria Entertainment Awards	Gospel Artist of the Year	Herself	Won	
2017	City People Movie Awards	Best Soundtrack Artiste of the Year	Herself	Won	
2020	Nigerian Canada Celebrities Entertainment Awards	Headline Celebrity Award	Herself	Won	
2023	Eagle Awards Africa Showcase	Special Icon Recipient (Non-Competitive)	Herself	Honoured	
2025	The Headies	Best Inspirational Song	Herself	Nominated	
2025	United States Congress	Proclamation of Congressional Recognition	Herself	Honoured	
2026	CLIMA Africa Awards	Africa Gospel Music Lifetime Achievement Award	Herself	Won	
2026	United States Government	US Presidential Lifetime Achievement Award	Herself	Honoured	
