= Neon Adejo =

Nigerian gospel singer

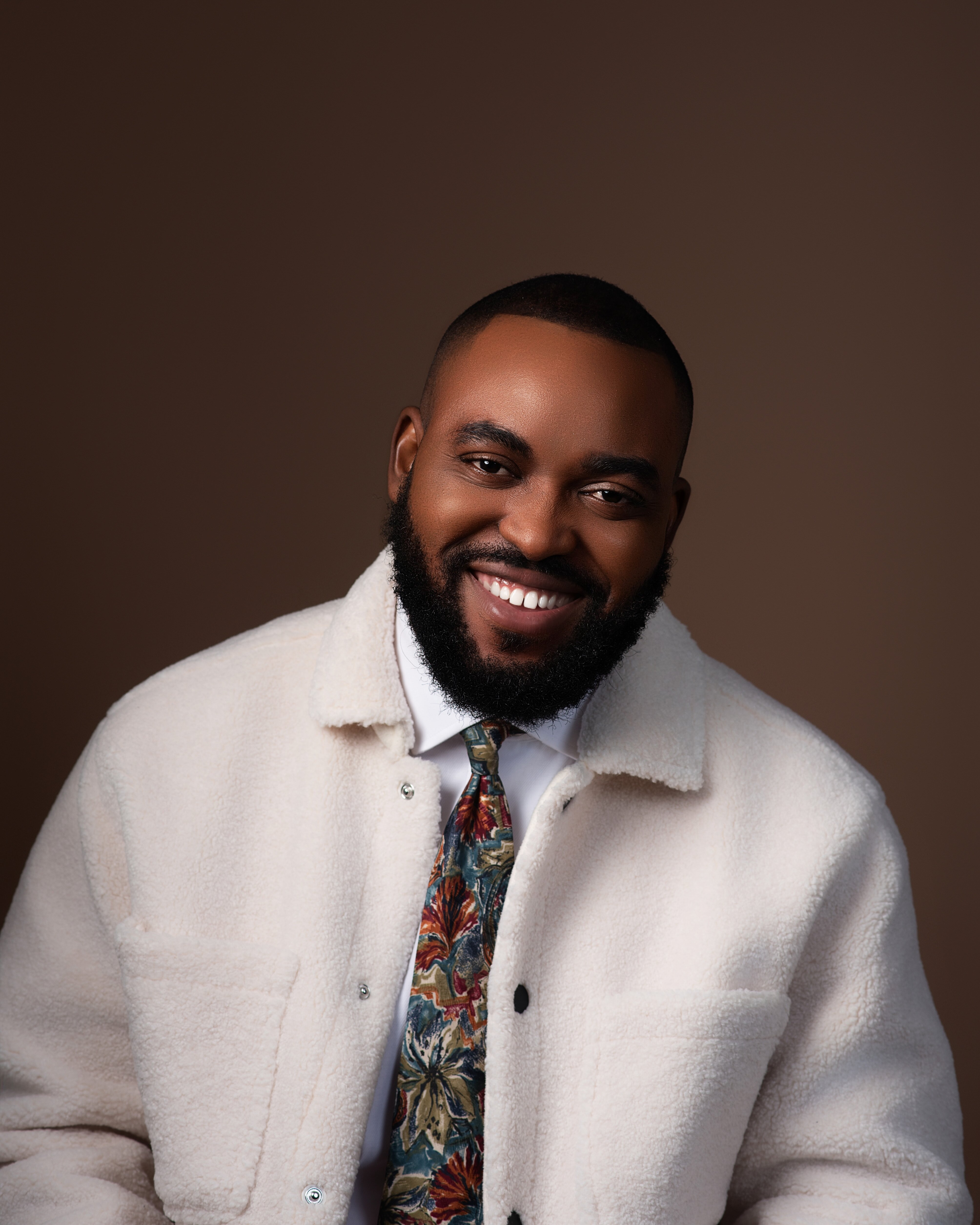

Background information
- Born: Neon Adejo Yunisa; 24 October; Lagos State, Nigeria
- Genres: R&B Gospel; Contemporary worship; Contemporary gospel
- Occupations: Singer; Songwriter; Philanthropist
- Instrument: Vocals
- Years active: 2014–present
- Label: Tribl
- Website: Official website

Neon Adejo Yunisa (born October 24), better known by the stage name Neon Adejo, is a Nigerian gospel singer, songwriter and worship leader well known for the hit songs "Eze Ebube" and "Breathe Upon Me". He is also the CEO of Kairos House Ltd.

== Biography ==
Neon Adejo is a Nigerian gospel singer, songwriter, and worship leader known for his soulful voice and inspiring music that blends contemporary sounds with deep spiritual themes.

Born Neon Adejo Yunisa on October 24 in Ikoyi, Lagos State, Nigeria, he is the eldest of six children. Raised in a Muslim family, he later converted to Christianity.

Neon began singing at the age of 13 and officially launched his music career in 2014.

In 2024, Neon married Lade Kehinde, marking a personal milestone. His educational background includes a bachelor's degree in History and International Relations from Kogi State University, earned in 2013.

== Music career ==
Neon Adejo started singing at the age of 13 but officially began his music career in 2014. He released his first album - Tell The World, in 2020, comprising 10 tracks.

A year after in March 2021, he released his second album and first EP, Songs of Gratitude, comprising five tracks, including Eze Ebube and Breathe Upon Me.

Following this, he announced the release of his third album, Nothing But The Gospel

A new chapter unfolded as Tribl Records, home to Maverick City, announced Neon Adejo's signing to their music label on March 13th 2025. This partnership marks a significant milestone in his career, expanding his reach in the global gospel music scene.

== Discography ==
=== Albums ===
| Title | Date Released | Details |
|---|---|---|
| Tell the world | April 2020 | Format: Digital Download, Streaming, CD; Number of Tracks: 10 |
| Songs of Gratitude (EP) | March 2021 | Format: Digital Download, Streaming, CD; Number of Tracks: 5 |
| Nothing But The Gospel | September 2022 | Format: Digital Download, Streaming, CD; Number of Tracks: 7 |
| Emerge (EP) | October 2024 | Format: Digital Download, Streaming; Number of Tracks: 5 |
| Sonship (EP) | March 2026 | Format: Digital Download, Streaming; Number of Tracks: 7 |

=== Singles ===
- Take It Away (2018)
- Chinecherem (2019)
- Onyenemema (2020)
- Amen (2021)
- Eze Ebube (2021)
- Eze Ebube II (2022)
- Free (2022)
- Breathe Upon Me - Teach Me How To Pray (2023)
- Onye - Here by Your Grace (2023)
- Favorite Baby (2024)
- Aanu - Here By Mercy (2025)
- Chinecherem (2025)
- Pikin (2025)

== Awards and nominations ==
| Year | Award | Category | Result | Ref |
|---|---|---|---|---|
| 2023 | Kingdom Achievers Award | Songwriter of the Year | Won | |
| 2023 | The Headies | Best Inspirational Single | Won | |
| 2023 | GX Awards | Best Male Artiste of the Year | Nominated | |
| 2023 | Praise Achievement Awards, Ghana | Best Song of the Year Africa | Won | |
| 2023 | Kingdom Achievers Awards | Spotlight Artist of the Year | Won | |
| 2023 | Kingdom Achievers Award | Song of the Year | Won | |
| 2024 | Antigua Barbuda Global Music & Media Awards | Best Praise & Worship | Won | |
| 2025 | Kingdom Achievers Awards | Best Vocal Performance | Won | |
| 2026 | Canadian Selah Music Awards | Gospel Album of the Year | Won | |

== Tours ==
- UK Tours
- Eze Ebube UK Tour
