= Bola Are =

Nigerian gospel singer (born 1954)

- Born: 1 October 1954 (age 71); Erio, Western Region, British Nigeria (now in Ekiti State, Nigeria)
- Citizenship: Nigeria
- Occupation: Gospel singer
- Years active: 1977–present

Bola Are (born 1 October 1954) is a Nigerian gospel singer and former President of the Gospel Musicians Association of Nigeria.

== Early life ==
She was born on 1 October 1954 in Erio a town in Ekiti-West local government, of Ekiti State, southwestern Nigeria to the Elder Babayomi and Mrs T. A. Babayomi who hail from Erio, Ekiti State, Nigeria. She was brought up by four major prophets in Christ Apostolic Church - Apostle Ayodele Babalola, Prophet Babajide, Prophet Akande and Prophet T.O. Obadare. She spent most of her time on the mountain and receives her inspiration from holy spirit.

== Education ==
Are began her primary education at Christ Apostolic Church (CAC) Primary school in her home town and her secondary education at Christ Apostolic Church Grammar School at Efon Alaye in Ekiti State before she proceeded to The Polytechnic, Ibadan, where she obtained a diploma certificate in accounting. In July 1985, she was awarded an honorary doctorate degree in Music at St. John's University.

== Personal life ==
Bola Are got married in 1977 to the late Pastor J.O Are and are blessed with children. Her children are singers and musicians. Bola Are Gospel foundation international aimed at catering for the needs of the less privileged in Nigeria, it was founded in 1995.Her recording studio, school of Gospel Music International was founded on 7 July 1990, to give gospel musicians a platform that would lead them in the way of the Lord. The school is currently located at C.A.C Agbala Oluwa, Bola Are street Ogbere Idi- Obi, beside Airport Quarters Ibadan, Bola Are Okiki Jesu Records international. Bola Are marked her 40 years on stage on 5 October 2013.

== Career ==
Singing from the age of two, Are knew she would serve the Lord at a very young age and pursued it. Her parents told her that she started singing a few day before her first birthday, that made her considers herself a born singer. After deciding to follow her passion for ministry, Evangelist Bola Are started a music band called Bola and Her Spiritual Singers on 26 June 1973. In August 1977, she released her first musical album Baba Ku Ise. As at 2014, Are had released over seventy albums.

== Albums (1965–2000) ==
- Divine Praise of the King Of Kings – 1965
- Ajaga Babiloni Wooo – 1967
- Anointed Praise 2 – 1970
- Bola Are Live – 1971
- Agbara Esu Ko Da Nibiti Jesu Gbe Njoba – 1971
- Homage 1 – 1974
- Halleluyah Jesus Lives – 1974
- Adura Owuro – 1977
- Baba Kuse – 1977
- Anointed Praise 1 – 1979
- Jesus Is Coming Back, Be Ready! – 1981
- Bibo Jesu Leekeji – 1988
- Gbongbo Idile Jesse – 1991
- Homage 2 (Tribute To Apostle T.O Obadare) – 1995
- Lion Of Judah – 1995
- Oore Ofe – 1998
- Power In Praise – 2000
- Apostle Joseph Ayodele Babalola – 2000

== See also ==
- List of Nigerian gospel musicians
