= The Experience (gospel concert) =

Nigerian annual, free gospel music concert

- Genre: Gospel
- Location: Tafawa Balewa Square.
- Years active: 2006 - present
- Founders: Paul Adefarasin
- Attendance: 700,000 (2016-2017)
- Website: theexperiencelagos.com

The Experience (commonly known as The Experience Lagos) is an annual, free gospel music concert held at the Tafawa Balewa Square in Lagos Island, Nigeria. Begun and hosted by House on the Rock lead pastor Paul Adefarasin in 2006, the first concert had an attendance of 70,000 people.

The concert features local and international artists such as Kirk Franklin, CeCe Winans, Donnie McClurkin, Don Moen, Frank Edwards, Nathaniel Bassey, Dunsin Oyekan and Chioma Jesus. The Experience is recognised as one of Africa's largest musical events. The music score and direction at the concert has been provided by Wilson Joel]] since 2013.

As a result of the restrictions on mass gathering due to the COVID-19 pandemic, the 2020 edition of the concert (tagged "The Experience 15 - Global Edition"), was performed virtually, with the performances live-streamed on satellite television and social media.

== History ==
The Experience was presented for the first time on 1 December 2006 at the Tafawa Balewa Square, with 70,000 people in attendance. The concert featured Kirk Franklin, Israel Houghton, Donnie McClurkin, Lionel Peterson, Jamal Bryant, Mike Aremu, Dunni Olanrewaju, Dc Envoys, Gordons, Asu Ekiye, Buchi, Tosin Martins, and Midnight Crew.

=== 2007–2009 ===
2007 was the only year in which the Experience has not been presented in December; that year, the concert was moved to 30 November. Participating musicians were Kirk Franklin, Israel Houghton, and Lionel Peterson. The 5 December 2008 concert featured Kirk Franklin, Donnie McClurkin, Don Moen, Fred Hammond, Kurt Carr, Chevelle Franklyn, Mary Mary, Muyiwa Olarewaju, ‘Dekunle Fuji and Midnight Crew. The fourth edition of the Experience, on 4 December 2009, featured music by Lara George, Sammie Okposo, Don Moen, Gordons, Timi Dakolo, Chevelle Franklyn, Donnie McClurkin, Mike Aremu, Nikki Laoye, Rooftop MCs, Ron Kenoly, BeBe and CeCe Winans, and Kirk Franklin.

=== 2010–2012 ===
The 3 December 2010 Experience featured Panam Percy Paul, Fred Hammond, Phil Driscoll, Judy Jacob, Don Moen, Papa San, Mary Mary, Mike Aremu, Sammy Okposo, Micah Stampley, Israel Houghton, and Chevelle Franklyn. Nigerian president Goodluck Jonathan and Lagos State governor Babatunde Fashola were in attendance.

The 2 December 2011 concert was moved to the Eko Hotels and Suites' Expo Center. The concert, which lasted from 5 pm to 1 am, included Don Moen, Chevelle Franklyn, Micah Stampley and Kirk Franklin, and required a free ticket. The seventh edition of the Experience, on 7 December 2012, featured Don Moen, Israel Houghton, Fred Hammond, Micah Stampley, Chevelle Franklin, Deitrick Haddon, Timi Dakolo and the Soweto Spiritual Singers. Yakubu Gowon, Tonye Cole, Olusegun Mimiko, Wale Adefarasin, Emmanuella Abimbola Fashola and Sam Adeyemi were in attendance.

=== 2013–2015 ===
The 6 December 2013 concert featured Don Moen, Donnie McClurkin, Yolanda Adams, Tye Tribbett, Israel Houghton, Cece Winans, Micah Stampley, Eben, Frank Edwards, Midnight Crew, and Freke. Over 600,000 people attended the 5 December 2014 concert, with Donnie McClurkin, Israel Houghton, Chevelle Franklin, Micah Stampley, Midnight Crew, Freke Umoh, Frank Edwards, Sinach, Nathaniel Bassey, Angella Christie, Onos Ariyo and Chioma Jesus performing. Jimi Agbaje, Abimbola Fashola and Femi Fani-Kayode attended the concert.

On 4 December 2015, Adefarasin held a press conference at the Eko Hotels and Suites for that year's concert. The performers were Don Moen, Fred Hammond, Frank Edwards, Donnie McClurkin, Hezekiah Walker, Kim Burrell, Jessica Reedy, Sonnie Badu, Chioma Jesus, Nathaniel Bassey, Sammie Okposo, Midnight Crew, Micah Stampley, Julius Nglass and the Lagos City Chorale. Unlike the previous one-day concerts, additional dates (12 and 15 December) were included in the event; over 700,000 people were in attendance.

=== 2016–2017 ===
The 2 December 2016 event, attended by 700,000 people, featured performances by Don Moen, Travis Greene, Donnie McClurkin, Tope Alabi, Tim Godfrey, Segun Obe, Samsong, Onos Ariyo, Gabriel Eziashi, Frank Edwards, Smokie Norful, Micah Stampley, Eno Michael, and Chioma Jesus. Nigerian vice-president Yemi Osinbajo, his wife Oludolapo Osinbajo, Don Jazzy, Tiwa Savage, Dr SID, and Toke Makinwa were in attendance.

For the 1 December 2017 concert, Victor Adeyemi of Global Harvest Church delivered an opening prayer; musical performances were by Tim Godfrey, Nathaniel Bassey, Chioma Jesus, Don Moen, Donnie McClurkin, Midnight Crew, Travis Greene, Tope Alabi, Frank Edwards, Sonnie Badu, Beejay Sax, Onos Ariyo, Eben, Micah Stampley and Kingsley "KaeStrings" Innocent. The concert was attended by over 700,000 people. Lagos State governor Akinwunmi Ambode, who commended House on the Rock for supplying 100 secondary schools in the state with computer laboratories, was in attendance.

=== 2018–2019 ===
The 7 December 2018 event with the theme Jesus our peace was attended by 700,000 people, featured performances by Nathaniel Bassey, Evangelist Amaka Okwuoha a.k.a. 'Chioma Jesus', Kirk Franklin, Tope Alabi, Tim Godfrey, Glowreeyah Braimah, Travis Greene, Don Moen, Donnie Mcclurkin, Onos Ariyo, Timi Dakolo, Eben, Lagos Metropolitan Choir (LMGC), Eno Michael and Chee. And for the first time at The Experience was J.J. Hairston, Planetshakers, Vicki Yohe, and Ada Ehi. Jimi Agbaje, Babajide Sanwo-olu, his wife Dr Ibijoke Sanwo-olu were in attendance.

For the 7 December 2019 concert (#LetsWorshipJesus), the Lagos Metropolitan Choir (LMGC) and Segun Obe rendered both stanzas of the Nigerian National anthem; musical performances were by Nathaniel Bassey, Evangelist Amaka Okwuoha a.k.a. 'Chioma Jesus', Tope Alabi, Tim Godfrey, Glowreeyah Braimah, Travis Greene, Don Moen, Donnie Mcclurkin, Sinach, Sammie Okposo, and Planetshakers. And for the first time at The Experience was Mercy Chinwo, Preye Odede, William McDowell and Todd Dulaney. It featured Nigerian comedians like Kenny Blaq, Larry J, Forever, MC Abbey and Akpororo. The concert which lasted for more than 10 hours was attended by almost a million people, Travis Greene recognised it as the largest Christian concert in the world. Jimi Agbaje, Segun Agbaje, Mr and Mrs Sola David-Borha, Mrs Folorunsho Alakija, Lagos State governor Babajide Sanwo-olu, his wife Dr Ibijoke Sanwo-olu were also at #TE14.

=== 2020 "Global Edition" ===
The 2020 edition of the concert held on Friday, 11 December 2020.

As a result of the restrictions on mass gatherings and to maintain physical distancing due to the COVID-19 pandemic, the 2020 edition of the concert, (tagged "The Experience 15 - Global Edition"), for the first time, did not take place at the Tafawa Balewa Square in Lagos which had hosted the past 14 editions. Instead, the entire concert was streamed online on YouTube, other digital platforms and designated channels on satellite television.

On the 23rd of November, the organisers tweeted: “Yes we had the last 14 editions together mainly in one place, yet now we're not apart, we're still in this together as we go global with the #TE15G. There are no barriers and nothing can stop us, our God deserves our praise all the way, and He will have it."

The 2020 edition showcased artistic musical performances, goodwill messages and intercessory prayers by internationally recognised artistes. Gospel acts already confirmed to perform include: Sinach, Nathaniel Bassey, Travis Greene, William Mcdowell, Don Moen, Ada, Chevelle Franklyn, Matt Redman, Eben, Mercy Chinwo, Onos Ariyo, Donnie Mcclurkin, Nokwe the Poet, The Planetshakers, Tasha Cobbs, Tope Alabi, The Cape Town Philharmonic Choir, Ana Paula Valadao, Maverick City, Sonnie Badu and Sheldon Bangera.

=== 2021–2022 ===
The 16th Experience concert of 2021 was held on 3 December, at The Rock Cathedral in Lekki, Lagos. The event began at about 9:00 PM (WAT), and was held in a hybrid format, combining in-person attendance with a global livestream. The event was broadcast to millions of viewers worldwide, including audiences from South America, Asia, Australia, and the United Kingdom, with millions of viewers tuning in via telecast and social streaming platforms.

The 2021 event featured a lineup of gospel artists, both local and international, including Don Moen, Donnie McClurkin, Nathaniel Bassey, Travis Greene, Sinach, Dunsin Oyekan, Tim Godfrey, Eben, Mercy Chinwo, William McDowell, Chevelle Franklyn, Chandler Moore, Segun Obe, Kike Mudiaga, and The Planetshakers.

In 2022, the concert marked a return to the traditional venue after two years of virtual and hybrid formats due to the COVID-19 pandemic. It held at Tafawa Balewa Square (TBS) in Lagos Island, on 2 December 2022.

Themed "Jesus: The Exceptional One", the 2022 concert commenced at 7:00 PM (WAT) and featured performances by several gospel artists, including Don Moen, Donnie McClurkin, Travis Greene, Chandler Moore, Phil Thompson, Nathaniel Bassey, Sinach, Moses Bliss, Mercy Chinwo, Tope Alabi, Mr. M & Revelation, Eben, Preye Odede, Eno Michael, Muyiwa Olanrewaju, Onos Ariyo, and the Lagos Metropolitan Gospel Choir. Also featured were stand-up comedians like Damilola, Forever, Kenny Blaq, MC Abbey, and Akpororo.

=== 2023–2024 ===
The 2023 and 2024 editions of The Experience marked its 18th and 19th iterations, respectively. Both events were held at the Tafawa Balewa Square, drawing thousands of attendees and millions of global viewers through livestreams and broadcasts.

The 2023 edition took place on 8 December 2023, and was themed "Jesus, Our Way Maker". The concert began at 7:00 PM (WAT) and featured a lineup of gospel artists, including Tope Alabi, Naomi Raine, Prinx Emmanuel, Beejay Sax, Timi Dakolo, Ada Ehi, Onos Ariyo, Travis Greene, Sinach, Dunsin Oyekan and Nathaniel Bassey, amongst others. The event was also supported by Coca-Cola, DSTV Nigeria, Dufil Prima Foods, Spotify and Bolt Naija.

The 2024 edition, tagged "Jesus Wins," was held on 6 December 2024, from 7:00 PM (WAT) till dawn. Similar to the previous year, the event featured Micah Stampley, Nathaniel Bassey, Chevelle Franklyn, Sinach, Adeyinka Alaseyori, Dunsin Oyekan, Bidemi Olaoba, Moses Bliss, Mercy Chinwo, Mr M & Revelation, The Lagos Metropolitan Gospel Choir (LMGC) amongst others.

== Venues, traffic, and security ==
Except for 2011, 2020 and 2021, the Experience has been presented at the Tafawa Balewa Square. The square, which has a normal capacity of 50,000, is equipped with extra seating for the concert. A combined Lagos State Traffic Management (LASTMA) and Nigeria Police Force is deployed to ease traffic flow, and police, the Rapid Response Squad, the Anti-Bomb Squad and private security are usually present at each concert. The show is directed by Theo Ukpaa.
