= Edward Sunday =

Nigerian record producer

- Born: 30 October 1973 (age 52)
- Origin: Edo State, Nigeria
- Occupations: record producer; sound engineer
- Instruments: DAW, Mixer
- Years active: 1998–present
- Label: Azusa Productions

Edward Sunday (born 30 October 1973) is a Nigerian gospel music producer and sound engineer. He is the founder of Azusa Productions.

== Early life and education ==
Edward Sunday was born on 30 October 1973 in Ibadan, Nigeria, to Mr. and Mrs. Onokaya. He originates from Owan West Local Government Area in Edo State, Nigeria and grew up primarily in Lagos. He began his education at New Eden Primary School in Ibadan and continued at the University of Ibadan Staff School for his secondary education. He later attended The Polytechnic, Ibadan, where he earned both an Ordinary National Diploma (OND) and a Higher National Diploma(HND) in Estate Management. In 2021, he was awarded a Doctor of Philosophy (PhD) in Music, Sound Engineering, and Concert Production from ESCAE University, Benin. In 2024, he received an additional PhD in the same field from Myles Leadership University.

== Career ==
Edward Sunday began his career as a choirmaster at a local church. In 1998, Edward Sunday began his career as a producer and engineer at VIF Studio in Ikeja, Lagos, Nigeria.

In 2012, Edward Sunday was appointed Head Sound Engineer and Technical Director at The Present House (The Water Brook). In 2016, he served as a judge for the music competition Voice Out.

In 2010 and 2018, Sunday contributed to live sound engineering activities for MTN Project Fame West Africa, He provided technical audio support during events connected to the launch of GOtv Africa by MultiChoice. In 2015, he worked on the Easy Click Fest tour organized by Etisalat, which featured performances by artists including Tiwa Savage, Olamide, and Don Jazzy.

In 2020, Edward Sunday founded Azusa Productions, a music and record production company. He has also worked on the production of live performances for several gospel artists.

== Production discography ==
Selected production and sound engineering discography
Year	Song title	Artiste	Note
2014	Victory Song	Ada Ehi	Sound Engineer
2015	All Power	Pat Uwaje King	
2015	Hossanah	Pat Uwaje King ft Odunayo Ojo Onasanya	
2017	I Overcame (Live)	Ada Ehi	Sound Engineer
2018	Worthy Is The Lamb	Sinach	Sound Engineer (Live)
2019	Toya	Tim Godfrey	Producer
2020	Mma Mma	Tim Godfrey	
2020	Wonderful Love	Ccioma	Sound Engineer (Live)
2020	Done Me Well (Live)	Ccioma	Producer
2022	Through Eternity	Minister GUC	Producer & Composer
2022	Obinigwe	Minister GUC	
2023	Jehovah Meliwo	Judikay ft 121 Selah	
2023	Emmanuel	Frank Edwards ft Moses Bliss	Sound Engineer
2023	Tobechukwu	Nathaniel Bassey ft Mercy Chinwo	Sound Engineer (Live)
2023	Fountain of Mercy	Nathaniel Bassey ft Sinach	Sound Engineer
2024	Ariwo Oyo	Laolu Gbenga	Sound Engineer
2024	Fragrance	Esther Orji	
2024	Praise Fest 2.0	Blessing Lopez	Sound Engineer
2026	Praise Fest 4.0	Blessing Lopez	Producer

== Awards and recognition ==
Selected awards and honors
Year	Presented by	Award	Recipient	Result
2023	Kingdom Achievers Awards	Special Recognition	Himself	Honored
2024	President's Lifetime Achievement Award	Joe Biden Lifetime Achievement Award	Himself	Honored
2024	African Icon Awards	Entertainment Icon of the Year	Himself	Won
