= Ayo Vincent =

Nigerian gospel musician (born 1980)

- Also known as: Ayo Vincent
- Born: Ayodele Enitan Bajulaiye; 18 February 1980 (age 46)
- Genres: Contemporary gospel; pop; electronic; Afro pop
- Occupations: Singer-songwriter, recording artist
- Instrument: Vocals
- Years active: 2012–present
- Spouse: (Hilary Vincent 2005-present)

Ayodele Enitan Vincent (born 18 February 1980) professionally known as Ayo Vincent, is a Nigerian gospel artist, singer-songwriter and author. She professionally started her music career in 2012 with the release of her debut album I Am Yours.

== Early life and education ==
Ayodele was born to Reverend Sunmbo Quashie and Felicia Bajulaiye on 18 February 1980, and grew up with her six siblings in Ojuelegba, Lagos. For her secondary education, she attended Queens College Yaba, Lagos and graduated from the Lagos State University, with a B.Sc in Economics.

== Music career ==
Ayodele started singing at the age of eight and by the time she was twelve, she joined her school’s choir, Queens College Yaba. In the University, she joined the Believers Love world Campus Fellowship and later served as the music director. Later, she joined the Christ Embassy Choir and rose to become a Zonal Music Director.

She officially started her music career in November 2012 with debut album “I Am Yours”. The album comprised 10 tracks and featured other gospel artists like Joe Praize and Florocka. That same year, she released her first single “You Are Great”. In 2014, she released another single titled “Serve the Lord” featuring Don Jazzy.

In 2019, she released the single “Your Presence Is Here” which later won her the LIMA Awards for Best Song of the year. She has performed alongside other gospel artists like Todd Dulaney, Sinach, LeCrae, Onyeka Onwenu, Nathaniel Bassey, Ada Ehi, Mercy Chinwo and others. On 30 June 2023, Ayodele released an album titled "Supernatural EP".

== Discography ==
=== Albums ===
- I Am Yours (LP)
- Supernatural (EP)

=== Selected singles ===
Selected singles
Year	Song title
2013	It's My Time (Oróbo Portion) ft Don Jazzy
2014	Obimo
2014	Serve the Lord ft. Don Jazzy
2015	Halleluyah ft Onos Ariyo
2016	Great & Mighty God
2017	You Reign
2018	Supernatural
2018	Your Presence is Here
2019	Narakele
2022	Aterere

== Bibliography ==
- Starting Over (2020)
- Dear Heavenly Father (2022)

== Awards ==
Awards for Vincent's music
Year	Award	Category	Result	Ref
2014	African Gospel Music Awards UK (AGMA)	Video of the Year	Won	
2014	Crystal Awards	Video of the Year	Won	
2019	LoveWorld International Music and Arts Ministry Awards (L.I.M.A)	Best Song	Won	

== Personal life ==
Ayodele got married on 25 June 2005 to Hilary Vincent, and they have four children.
