= Limoblaze =

Nigerian gospel singer (born 1995)

- Also known as: Limoblaze
- Born: Samuel Onwubiko; 25 October 1995 (age 31); Abia State, Nigeria
- Genres: Afro gospel; afrobeat; hip hop
- Occupations: Singer-songwriter; rapper
- Instrument: Vocals
- Years active: 2014–present
- Labels: Reach Records; Oneskirpt Ltd
- Website: limoblaze.com

Samuel Onwubiko (born 25 October 1995), known by his stage name Limoblaze, is a Nigerian gospel singer-songwriter and rapper. He is well known for the hit song "Jireh (My Provider)" with Lecrae and Happi, a reworking of "Jireh" by Elevation Worship and Maverick City Music; the song made it to the Billboard U.S. Afrobeats Songs of 2022, Official Charts No. 15, and won several other nominations including The Headies and The Stellar Awards.

== Biography ==
=== Early life and education ===
He is one of eight children born to Samuel and Nkechi Onwubiko in Abia State, Nigeria, and was brought up in Makurdi-Benue state. Aged 8 years, he discovered the songs of popular rappers such as Tupac, Eminem and 50 Cent and later came across Christian rappers such as Lecrae, the Ambassador, Andy Mineo, Da' T.R.U.T.H. and Tedashii. This influenced him to become an Afro gospel, Afrobeat and Hip-hop gospel singer, songwriter, recording and performing artist. He studied Biochemistry at the Federal University of Agriculture Makurdi, Nigeria during which he joined the Day Star Church where his professional gospel musical career began.

He currently lives in the United Kingdom.

== Musical career ==
He started his career officially as an independent and unsigned music recording artist and started with his first song titled "Memories" which he dedicated to his classmates after graduating from high school. After his first song, he went on to record other songs titled Grace, Unconditional, Wrong Ways, For the King which features an American rapper Los of (HGA), and So on. He likewise made some collaborations with gospel artists such as Ada Ehi, Travis Greene, Da' T.R.U.T.H. as well as many others with various freestyle sessions. His Debut Album Blind was released in 2016 while his second album Before Now, was released in 2018, followed by Afrobeats Raps & Jesus released 2019, The Wait E.P in 2020 and he released his fourth studio joint album featuring Da' T.R.U.T.H. titled Bridges, on 20 November 2020, which charted on trending spots on both local and international digital stores.

In July 2022, he released the hit single "Jireh (My Provider)" featuring Lecrae and Happi. The song made it to Billboard Year-End U.S. Afrobeats Songs of 2022

In October 2022, Christian Hip Hop label Reach Records announced Limoblaze to their roster, making him the first signee to be based outside of America.

On 2023 he won the ABGMA Best Afrobeat Award of the year.

== Discography ==
=== Studio albums ===
| Title | Details | Peak chart positions |
| Title | Details | US Gospel |
|---|---|---|
| Blind | Released: 4 December 2016; Label: Independent; Formats: Digital download, streaming | — |
| Before Now | Released: 20 July 2018; Label: Independent; Formats: Digital download, streaming | — |
| Afrobeats Raps and Jesus | Released: 13 December 2019; Label: Independent; Formats: Digital download, streaming | — |
| Bridges (with Da' T.R.U.T.H.) | Released: 20 November 2020; Label: Next Music; Formats: Digital download, streaming | — |
| God's Favourite Baby | Released: 2 July 2021; Label: Independent; Formats: Digital download, streaming | — |
| Young & Chosen | Released: 23 August 2024; Label: Reach Records; Formats: CD, digital download, streaming | 18 |
"—" denotes a recording that did not chart or was not released in that territory.

=== EP(s) ===
- The Wait (2020)
- Sunday in Lagos (2023)
- Gold Remix Pack (2023)
- Solid Ground (2026)

=== Singles ===
| Title | Year | Peak chart positions | | | | | Album |
| Title | Year | US Afro. | US Christ. | US Gospel | US Gospel Digital | US Gospel Stream. | Album |
|---|---|---|---|---|---|---|---|
| "My Story" (featuring Da' T.R.U.T.H.) | 2018 | — | — | — | — | — | Non-album singles |
| "Blow My Mind" | 2020 | — | — | — | — | — | Non-album singles |
| "Okay" (featuring Ada Ehi) | 2020 | — | — | — | — | — | Non-album singles |
| "Sound of Victory" (featuring Da' T.R.U.T.H. and Travis Greene) | 2020 | — | — | — | — | — | Non-album singles |
| "Mind" | 2021 | — | — | — | — | — | Non-album singles |
| "This Loving" (featuring Johnny Drille) | 2021 | — | — | — | — | — | Non-album singles |
| "Ife Wami" | 2022 | — | — | — | — | — | Non-album singles |
| "Gold" (featuring Ehi) | 2022 | — | — | — | — | — | Non-album singles |
| "Desire" | 2022 | — | — | — | — | — | Non-album singles |
| "Jireh (My Provider)" (featuring Happi and Lecrae) | 2022 | 26 | 28 | 11 | 6 | 13 | Non-album singles |
| "Put It On God" (featuring Annatoria) | 2023 | — | — | — | — | — | Young & Chosen |
| "Desire Pt. 2" (featuring Caleb Gordon) | 2023 | — | — | — | — | — | Non-album singles |
| "Pretty Day" (featuring Madison Ryann Ward) | 2023 | — | — | — | — | — | Non-album singles |
| "My Matter" (featuring Victor Thompson and Becca Folkes) | 2023 | — | — | — | — | — | Non-album singles |
| "Talk & Do" (featuring Ehi) | 2023 | — | — | — | — | — | Young & Chosen |
| "Good God II" (featuring Naomi Raine) | 2024 | — | — | — | — | — | Young & Chosen |
| "One Day" (featuring KB) | 2024 | — | — | 25 | — | — | Non-album singles |
| "Freedom" (featuring Annatoria and Oneskript) | 2024 | — | — | — | — | — | Non-album singles |
| "Holy Father" | 2024 | — | — | — | — | — | Young & Chosen |
"—" denotes a recording that did not chart or was not released in that territory.

=== Other charted songs ===
| Title | Year | Peak chart positions | | Album |
| Title | Year | US Afro. | US Christ. | Album |
|---|---|---|---|---|
| "No Greater Love" (featuring Joe L. Barnes) | 2024 | 47 | — | Young & Chosen |
| "Like Water" (with Forrest Frank) | 2025 | — | 42 | Child of God II |
"—" denotes a recording that did not chart or was not released in that territory.

== Awards and recognition ==
He received Crystal award nominations in three categories in 2015. In 2019, Limoblaze was nominated (alongside Tim Godfrey, Todd Dulaney, Osby Berry, Jonathan McReynolds, Chevelle Franklyn, Phil Thompson, Tasha Cobbs, Joe Mettle, and Koyrn Hawthorne) in the Premier Gospel Awards for Best International Act and on 11 May 2019 in London he was announced as winner. Limoblaze was also Afro Rap Artiste of Excellence in the 2019 African Gospel Music and Media Awards. He has been "Artist of the Week" on Nigeria's Channels TV.

| Year | Award | Category | Result | Ref. |
|---|---|---|---|---|
| 2015 | The Crystal Awards | Best New Artiste | Nominated | |
| 2015 | The Crystal Awards | Best Collaboration | Nominated | |
| 2015 | The Crystal Awards | Best Rap/Hip-Hop | Nominated | |
| 2019 | Premier Gospel Awards | Best International Act | Won | |
| 2019 | African Gospel Music and Media Awards (AGMMA) | Afro Rap Artiste of Excellence | Won | |
| 2022 | Step FWD Awards | International Artist of the Year | Won | |
| 2022 | Premier Gospel Awards | Best International Act | Won | |
| 2023 | The Headies | Best Inspirational Song | Pending | |
| 2023 | The Stellar Awards | Rap/Hip-Hop Song of the Year | Pending | |
| 2023 | Vine Awards | African Song of the Year | Won | |
| 2023 | Vine Awards | African Act of the Year | Won | |
| 2023 | Premier Gospel Awards | Best Male Vocalist | Won | |
| 2023 | Premier Gospel Awards | Best Song of the Year | Won | |
| 2024 | MOBO Awards | Best Gospel Act | Won | |

== Personal life ==
Limoblaze proposed to Favour Emma, his long-term girlfriend in September 2021. They were married on 1 April 2022. He lives in London in the United Kingdom.

== See also ==
- List of Nigerian gospel musicians
- List of Nigerian musicians
