= Adefarasin =

Adéfarasin is a surname of Yoruba origin, meaning "the crown or royalty is/remains buried". People with this surname include:

- Hilda Adefarasin (1925–2023), Nigerian women's rights activist
- Justice Adefarasin (1921–1989), Nigerian judge
- Paul Adefarasin (born 1963), Nigerian pastor and televangelist
- Remi Adefarasin (born 1948), English cinematographer
