= Abraham Great =

British-Nigerian author and thought leader

- Born: November 6, 1977 (age 48); Lagos State, Nigeria
- Education: University of Buckingham
- Occupations: Author and thought leader
- Website: www.abrahamgreat.com

Abraham Great (born November 6, 1977) is a British-Nigerian author and thought leader. He is chair and founder of Great Dynasty Group Global Limited, a conglomerate with publishing, technology, and consultancy interests. Great also has a background in church leadership and music ministry, including composing songs and choir training in several countries.

== Early life and education ==
Born in Lagos, Nigeria, Great initially slated to study chemical engineering at the University of Lagos, a pursuit that was marred with delays and admission complication and prolonged school strike, before he turned to a missionary in 1997, and began his journey in studying religious studies that takes him from countries to countries, eventually graduating with a degree from Life Christian University in Tampa, Florida. In 2019 he was awarded an LLB in Law with Management at the University of Buckingham, prior to returning to the same institution where he earned an MSc in Management Service in 2020.

== Career ==
Great began life as a missionary with the World Mission Agency of Living Faith Church (also known as Winners Chapel), where he was music director for the Abidjan, Côte d'Ivoire branch of the church.[6]. He went on to found He Lives Bible Church (HLBC), where he is the Senior Pastor. During his years in Cote D’Ivoire, Great also worked with Professor Ropo Sekoni and his wife Banke Sekoni, while the couple were on exile from the Nigeria Military rules, at the tale end of the NADECO struggle, he witnessed first hand, the planning and strategizing to get Nigeria into democracy and to get Senator Bola Ahmed Tinubu elected as governor of Lagos State in 1999.

In music, Great released his maiden gospel album Jesus Christ Est Vivant in December 1999 and another album, Next Level, in 2017. He has also written for other musicians, such as the chorus of Morilekanlorile by Nigerian gospel singer Bouqui, and collaborated with other musicians like Mike Aremu, Agboola Shadare, Wole Oni, Eben, and Sammie Okposo.

In 2010 Great established Golden Pen Ltd, a record label and publishing company. He has authored many books on leadership, and personal development some of which are available on Amazon.

Great is the founder and chair of Great Dynasty Group Global Limited, a consulting firm, publishing company, technology provider, one of the topmost LED Display providers, XL Magnis LTDand immigration services firm. He has written opinion pieces and academic works, including a journal article titled Redefining the Nigerian System of Government: The Error of a Copied Democracy without True Federalism.

Great has also rendered public opinion on governance, technology, and socio-economic matters and written articles in Nigerian and international media outlets.

== Awards and honors ==
- 2025 – Received Distinguished Fellowship Award from the Ghana Institute of Management and Public Administration (GIMPA)
- 2025 – Received Value Adding Partner award from Absen, a LED manufacturing firm based in Shenzhen, China.
