= House on the Rock (church) =

House On The Rock
- House On The Rock
- 6°26′12″N 3°29′37″E
- Location: Lekki - Epe Expy, 105102, Lekki, Nigeria
- Country: Nigeria
- Website: houseontherock.org.ng

History
- Founded: 1994
- Founder: Paul Adefarasin

Specifications
- Capacity: 10,000

House on the Rock is an Evangelical Christian Church headquartered in Lagos, Nigeria.

It is well known for its annual musical concert, The Experience (World's Largest Gospel Concert), which features both local and international gospel musicians.

== History ==
The church was initially founded by Paul Adefarasin in 1994, from his mother's living room in Lagos. It has expanded to over 50 branches worldwide, mostly in Nigeria, with several provinces in South Africa, the Democratic Republic of the Congo, Ireland, and the United Kingdom. Adefarasin has stated that he is inspired by US preacher T. D. Jakes.

== The Rock Cathedral ==
The Rock Cathedral (also known as the Millennium Temple) is located in Ikate-Elegushi, Lekki, Lagos Lagos and houses the global headquarters of House On The Rock and The Rock Foundation. It accommodates religious and social functions, including worship, education, healthcare, community development, reformation training, recreation and social rehabilitation. Adefarasin has been quoted saying that the idea behind the cathedral is to provide a "one-stop centre for Christians looking for materials and goods of every kind."

The official commissioning of The Rock Cathedral which has a sitting capacity of 10,000 took place on 20 April 2013, with prominent personalities in attendance, including Goodluck Jonathan and Tony Blair.

== The Rock Foundation ==
The Rock Foundation is a non-profit charity organisation that provides health care, education, social reformation, and relief materials to those in need. The foundation operates primarily in Nigeria and the West Africa region. Adefarasin serves as the Founder and President of the foundation. His wife, Ifeanyi Adefarasin, is the co-founder of The House On The Rock and is a Pastor in the church.

=== Project Spread ===
The Rock Foundation's Project Spread is a year-end empowerment program that distributes food, medicine, and other necessities to inhabitants in disadvantaged regions.

Adefarasin led a team of around 20,000 people to the Lagos Island, Ikate-Elegushi, Ebute-Meta, and Bariga communities in December 2017 to launch the year's campaign. Lagos Island was chosen as Adefarasin was born in that community.

== Notable Events ==
=== The Experience ===
The Experience is an annual free musical concert organised by the church and involving various renowned gospel musicians from Nigeria and around the world. The event started in 2006 and is hosted each year at the Tafawa Balewa Square on Lagos Island.

Gospel musicians such as Travis Greene, Kirk Franklin, CeCe Winans, Donnie McClurkin, Don Moen, Frank Edwards, Nathaniel Bassey, Tope Alabi and Chioma Jesus have previously headlined the concert.
