= Abidemi =

Nigerian given name of Yoruba descent

- Gender: Unisex
- Language: Yoruba

Origin
- Language: Nigerian
- Meaning: Born awaiting my return
- Region of origin: South-west

Other names
- Variant form: Abídèmí
- Short form: Bidemi

Abidemi audio (Abídèmí) is a Nigerian unisex name of the Yoruba language meaning "Born awaiting my return". It is commonly given to a child when their father is away on a trip/journey, Abídèmí falls under one of the categories of names in Yoruba language known as Oruko-Abiso, meaning ascribed/acquired names. Bídèmí is the diminutive form for Abídèmí.

== Notable people bearing the name ==
- Iseoluwa Abidemi (born 2004), Nigerian gospel singer
- Abidemi Sanusi, Nigerian author
- Bidemi Olaoba, Nigerian gospel singer

=== Fictional characters ===
- Nezhno Abidemi (Gentle), Wakandan mutant superhero and X-Men member in Marvel Comics
