= Vumomse =

Cameroonian musician and songwriter

- Also known as: Vumomse
- Born: Charles Vumomse
- Genres: Gospel Afro pop Inspiration
- Occupation: Musician
- Years active: 2012–present

Charles Vumomse better known as Vumomse is a Cameroonian Afro-pop and urban gospel musician and songwriter.

== Early life and education ==
Vumomse is a family nurse practitioner and an alumnus of South University, Georgia, United States with a master's degree. He is married to Peace Favor with whom they have four children.

== Music career ==
Vumomse released his first album Rakata in 2014. which earned him a nomination at the All Africa Music Award 'AFRIMA'. He is the Co Founder of Calabash Music Label and the Host of Solid Rock Worship Festival an annual worship concert which aims at winning souls for the Kingdom of God. Vumomse has performed and worked with many African Gospel Artiste including, Tim Godfrey, Mercy Chinwo, Uche Agu, Mokambe.

== Discography ==
=== Album ===
- Rakata (2014)

=== Selected singles ===
- "Shine Everyday"
- "Grace To Grass"
- "Move it"

== Recognition ==
- Best male artiste in Inspiration - AFRIMA (2015)
- Best Gospel Artist and Best Male Artist - Urban Jamz Awards (2016)
- Best Gospel Artiste - DEA 2016
