= Agboola =

Agboọlá
- Gender: Male
- Language: Yoruba

Origin
- Origin: Nigeria
- Meaning: The gathering of wealth
- Region of origin: South western Nigeria

Agboọlá audiois both a surname and a given name of Yoruba origin which means the gathering of wealth.

== Notable people with the name include ==
- Reuben Agboola (born 1962), Nigerian footballer
- Agboola Shadare, Nigerian songwriter
- Ibrahim Agboola Gambari, Nigerian politician
