= Chioma Jesus =

Nigerian gospel singer

- Born: Amaka Okwuoha Ebizie; 12 February 1972 (age 54); Abia State, Nigeria
- Origin: Imo state
- Genres: Gospel; Igbo Christian music; contemporary gospel; worship
- Occupations: Singer; songwriter; actress
- Instrument: Vocals
- Years active: 2003–present
- Label: CJ Entertainment

Amaka Okwuoha (née Ebizie; born 12 February 1972), known professionally as Chioma Jesus, is a Nigerian gospel singer, songwriter, and worship leader. She rose to prominence with the release of her 2003 song "Chioma," from which her stage name is derived. She is recognized for her contributions to the popularization of indigenous gospel music, particularly songs performed in the Igbo language.

== Early life and background ==
Chioma Jesus was born Amaka Ebizie on 12 February 1972, in Aba, Abia State, Nigeria, to Nze Euzebius Chukwumaeze Ebizie and Lolo Dorathy Ebizie. She is of Igbo heritage and was raised in a Christian household. Originally from Imo State, she was the eldest of seven children. Following the death of her parents during her childhood, she assumed the responsibility of supporting her younger siblings under difficult conditions.

Before transitioning to a full-time music career, she worked as a trader in the food industry. Her musical journey began at the age of nine when she joined her local church choir in Imo State. She later became a soloist and chorus leader with the Scripture Union Fellowship, developing her vocal skills through participation in church programs and evangelistic crusades.

== Career ==
Chioma Jesus gained recognition after releasing her debut single "Chioma" in 2003. She described the song as being divinely inspired and said it led to the adoption of her stage name. Her music is primarily performed in the Igbo language, with occasional lyrics in English and Yoruba. Chioma Jesus' music features a fusion of traditional Igbo rhythms and contemporary gospel styles. Her rise continued with a nomination for the Delta Yadah Award in 2010, which she subsequently won in 2011 and 2012. In 2011, she released the popular single "Praise," which peaked atop the Nigerian gospel music charts.

Among her notable songs are "Okemmuo" (featuring Mercy Chinwo, 2020), "Na God I Dey Praise" (2021), and "Bulldozer" (2020). As of 2023, "Okemmuo" had received over 13 million views on YouTube. Chioma Jesus has collaborated with prominent gospel artists, including Mercy Chinwo, Sinach, and Nathaniel Bassey, and has performed alongside Don Moen, Cece Winans, Tim Godfrey and Ron Kenoly. She has co-headlined The Experience from 2013 to 2019 at the Tafawa Balewa Square.

== Personal life ==
Chioma Jesus is married to evangelist Callistus Okwuoha and has three children. During a church revival, she became a born again on 28 August 1986. Chioma Jesus is the founder of the Inheritance of Mercy Foundation, a charitable organization based in Port Harcourt, Rivers State.

== Discography ==
=== Studio albums ===
List of studio albums
Title	Album details	Year released
My Testimony	Number of Tracks: 8; Formats: Streaming, digital download	2019
Prophetic Praise	Number of Tracks: 10; Formats: Streaming, digital download	2020
Miracle God	Number of Tracks: 10; CJ ENTERTAINMENT; Formats: Streaming, digital download	2020
Divine Level Praise	Number of Tracks: 10; CJ ENTERTAINMENT; Formats: Streaming, CD; digital download; streaming	2020
Chiomalized	Number of Tracks: 10; Formats: CD; digital download; streaming	2020
Next Level	Number of Tracks: 10; CJ ENTERTAINMENT; Formats: CD; digital download; streaming	2021

=== Live albums ===
List of live albums
Title	Music Details	Year released
Chioma Jesus Miracle God Vol. 1	Number of Tracks: 2; Formats: CD; digital download; streaming	2012
Chioma Jesus, Vol. 2 (Miracle God)	Number of Tracks: 2; Formats: CD; digital download; streaming	2014
Nkwa Chioma Jesus Live, Vol. 1	Number of Tracks: 2; Formats: CD; digital download; streaming	2016

=== Extended plays ===
List of EPs
Title	Music Details	Year released
Holy Ghost	Number of Tracks: 6; Formats: Streaming, digital download	2024

== Awards and nominations ==
Year	Event	Category	Result	Ref
2018	City People Entertainment Awards	Gospel Artist of the Year	Nominated	
2019	Africa Gospel Awards	Africa Gospel Praise Artist of the Year	Nominated	
2020	Galaxy Music Awards	Gospel Artiste of the year	Won	
2022	CLIMA Africa Awards	Africa Gospel Song Of The Year	Won	
2022	CLIMA Africa Awards	Africa Female Gospel Artist Of The Year	Nominated	
2022	CLIMA Africa Awards	Africa Gospel Song Of The Year	Nominated	
2022	CLIMA Africa Awards	Africa Gospel Album Of The Year	Nominated	
2023	Eagle Awards Africa	Gospel Music Icon	Won	
2023	Kingdom Achievers awards	Herself	Honoured	
