= Mike Abdul =

Nigerian gospel musical artist

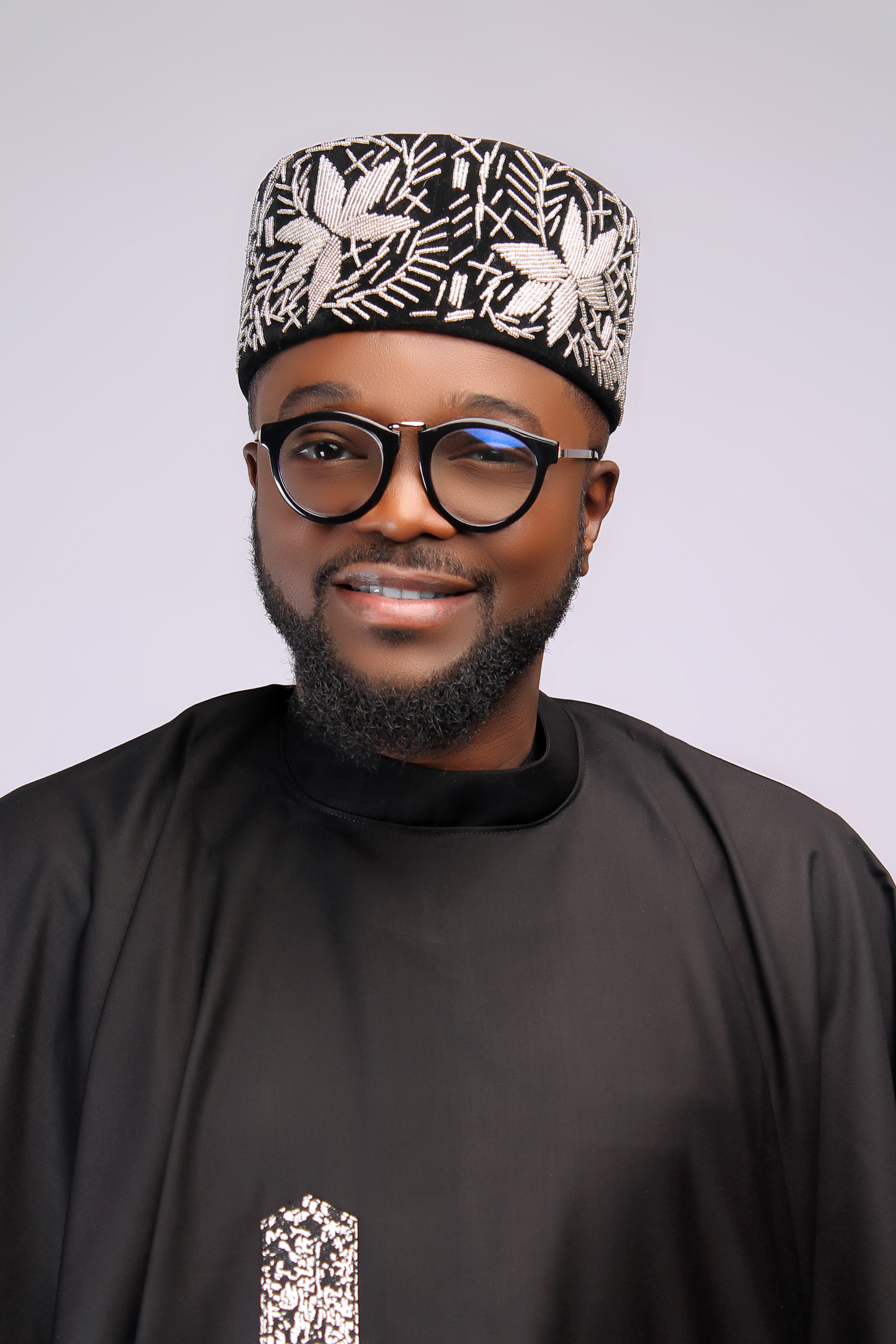
- Born: Michael Olayinka Abdul; 12 February 1977 (age 49); Lagos State
- Education: Yaba College of Technology, Lagos

Michael Olayinka Abdul (born 12 February 1977), popularly known as Mike Abdul, is a Nigerian gospel singer, music producer and songwriter. He served as an executive officer at Midnight Crew Music Limited. He has worked with several Nigerian gospel artists and music producers which include MoniQue, Tim Godfrey and others.

== Early life and education ==
Mike was born on 12 February in Lagos, Nigeria. He hails from Ijebu-Ode in Ogun State, Nigeria. His parents grew up in Ijebu dynasty, his father at Ago-Iwoye and his mother at Ijebu-Oru.

He had his Nursery and Primary education at A-Z Nursery and Mayflower School, Ikenne. He studied Electrical Engineering in the Yaba College of Technology, Lagos in Nigeria. After which, he furthered to Faith Christian Theological Seminary, Theology and Christian Education in Sango Otta, Ogun State where he studied Theology and Christian Education.

== Music career ==
His music career kicked off professionally in November 8, 2001, when he and three others founded "The Midnight Crew", a group that reigned in the 2000s and popularly known for their hit song “Igwe”. He served as an executive officer in the Midnight Crew and also worked with Spaghetti record.

He became popular after the release of the albums Good 2 Go, Korede and Grateful. He has worked with several Nigerian gospel artists. His Talent has won him several awards. He rose to fame as an award-winning gospel singer from Nigeria. Mike Abdul is currently one of the richest and most influential gospel music singer in Nigeria with an estimated net worth of $1-5 million. He currently holds a position among the top 10 Nigerian gospel artists and is considered the most featured Nigerian gospel musician ever.

In 2021, his song "Baba Ese" ranked the highest streamed music in Nigeria by Boomplay ahead of Mercy Chinwo, Onos Ariyo and others. He performed at the Africa Praise Experience (TAPE), 2022.

In 2024, during an interview with Believers Companion, a gospel music review blog, he confirmed that the members of Midnight Crew decided to pursue solo careers after their 20th anniversary concert at the University of Lagos in 2011.

In 2013, he launched his solo career with a song titled "Morire," featuring Monique.

== Personal life ==
His first marriage was with Vivien Stephen. He is currently single.

== Discography ==
Mike has sung and featured on over 100 songs. Some of his songs include:

- Iro halleluyah
- Crossover
- Good 2 go
- Morire
- Eyan Jesu
- Jesu mi da
- 30 billion halleluyah
- Iye re
- Toh Marvelous
- Korede
- Pray for me
- God Alone
- No other name
- Cross Over
- Keep it to Myself
- Angeli
- Most High
- This New Year

=== EPs ===
- House of Praise
- Dimension of Praise
- Grateful

=== Features ===
- Testify
- Sing unto the Lord
- No alternative
- Commot body

== Awards and nominations ==
Awards	Category	Status	Year
Crystal Awards	Song of the year	Won	2014
All Africa Awards (AFRIMA)	Best male artist in Africa	Nominated	2016
City People Music Awards	Gospel Artist of the Year	Won	2018
Kingdom Achievers Awards	Best Male artist	Won	2022
