= Midnight Crew =

Midnight Crew can refer to:

- A group of police officers led by Jon Burge known for involvement in a torture scandal
- Midnight Crew, a gospel music quartet led by Pat Uwaje-King
- The Midnight Crew, a group of characters in Homestuck
