= Testimony Jaga =

Nigerian Fuji, afro-pop recording artist and performer

- Also known as: Testimony Jaga
- Born: Salau Aliu Olayiwola; 9 March 1987 (age 39); Oyo, Nigeria
- Origin: Ogun State
- Genres: Afrobeats; afropop; Fuji
- Occupations: Singer and performer
- Instruments: Vocals; singing
- Years active: 2012–present
- Label: Loveworld Records
- Website: testimonyjaga.com

Salau Aliu Olayiwola (born March 9, 1987), known by his stage name Testimony Jaga, is a Nigerian Fuji, afro-pop recording and performing gospel artist who started his gospel musical career from Loveworld Records under Pastor Chris Oyakhilome. Testimony Jaga's gospel career was preceded by the release of the single "Igara," which won him the "Artist of the Year" awards at The LIMA Awards 2019. His songs are mostly composed in English and Yoruba.

== Early life and education ==
Salau Aliu Olayiwola was born on 9 March 1987 in Ibadan, Oyo State to a father who married six wives and had twenty-seven children. He happened to be the twenty-second child and a native of Ijebu-Remo in Ogun State. He picked an interest in music at a young age. He began his education at O and A nursery and primary school establishment in Ogun State and completed his secondary school education at Speed Ladded School. Due to his interest in music, he dropped out of University of Lagos to concentrate on full time music.

== Career ==
Testimony Jaga's career as a gospel singer started in 2012 after he stopped making secular music. He is the pioneer of Street Gospel Movement, a ministry that combines music and social welfare service as tool for spreading the gospel to people in the streets of Lagos.

Testimony Jaga became popular after the debut release of his 2018 gospel single titled "Igara", which won him Artiste of the Year at LIMA 2019. He composes and sings his songs in English, Yoruba and Pidgin language, and has released other singles including "Take It" and "Jehovah Doer". He has featured gospel artists such Akporo, Frank Edwards, Israel Strong, etc and as well, has been featured on gospel songs belonging to other gospel musical artists such as Mike Abdul, Password, Timi Phoenix, Elijah Daniel, Ologodidan amongst others.

On 20 July 2019, Revolution Plus Property unveiled Testimony Jaga as their brand ambassador. He was also unveiled as one of Agil Express brand ambassador on 28 January 2022.

Testimony Jaga embarked on his first major media tour in United Kingdom titled "Testimony Jaga Live in UK" in November 2021.

== Personal life ==
In 2011 Testimony Jaga was arrested alongside a group of other suspects and jailed for alleged car-snatching belonging to a man who died during the supposed car robbery at his residence in Lagos during his early musical career. Four months later after investigation, he was exonerated by the magistrate court and cleared of all charges against him, and he was released.

== Discography ==
=== Singles ===
- "Igara (Boast)" 2019
- "Take it" 2019
- "Jehova" 2019
- "Gbese" 2019
- "Gone For Life" 2019
- "Goal!" 2019
- "Mash It" 2020
- "Kpansa Kpansa" 2020
- "Jehovah Doer" 2020
- "Miracle" 2020
- "Parti Pour La Vie" 2020
- "Kpansa Kpansa (French Version)" 2020
- "Not Enough" 2020
- "I Have Moved ft Israel Strong" 2020
- "Jesus" 2020
- "Biggie Biggie" 2020
- "Gbera" 2020
- "Omo Olorun Soro Soke" 2020
- "Not Normal ft Akpororo" 2021
- "My Style" 2021
- "My Thanks (Ese)" 2021
- "My Evidence ft Frank Edwards" 2021
- "Apero for Christ" 2021
- "Give Him Praise" 2021
- "Power In My Praise" 2022
- "Tungba In Christ" 2022
- "I Don't Care" 2022

== Awards and nominations ==
Year	Award ceremony	Prize	Result
2019	LIMA Awards	Artist of The Year	Won
