= Ada Ehi =

Nigerian gospel singer (born 1983)

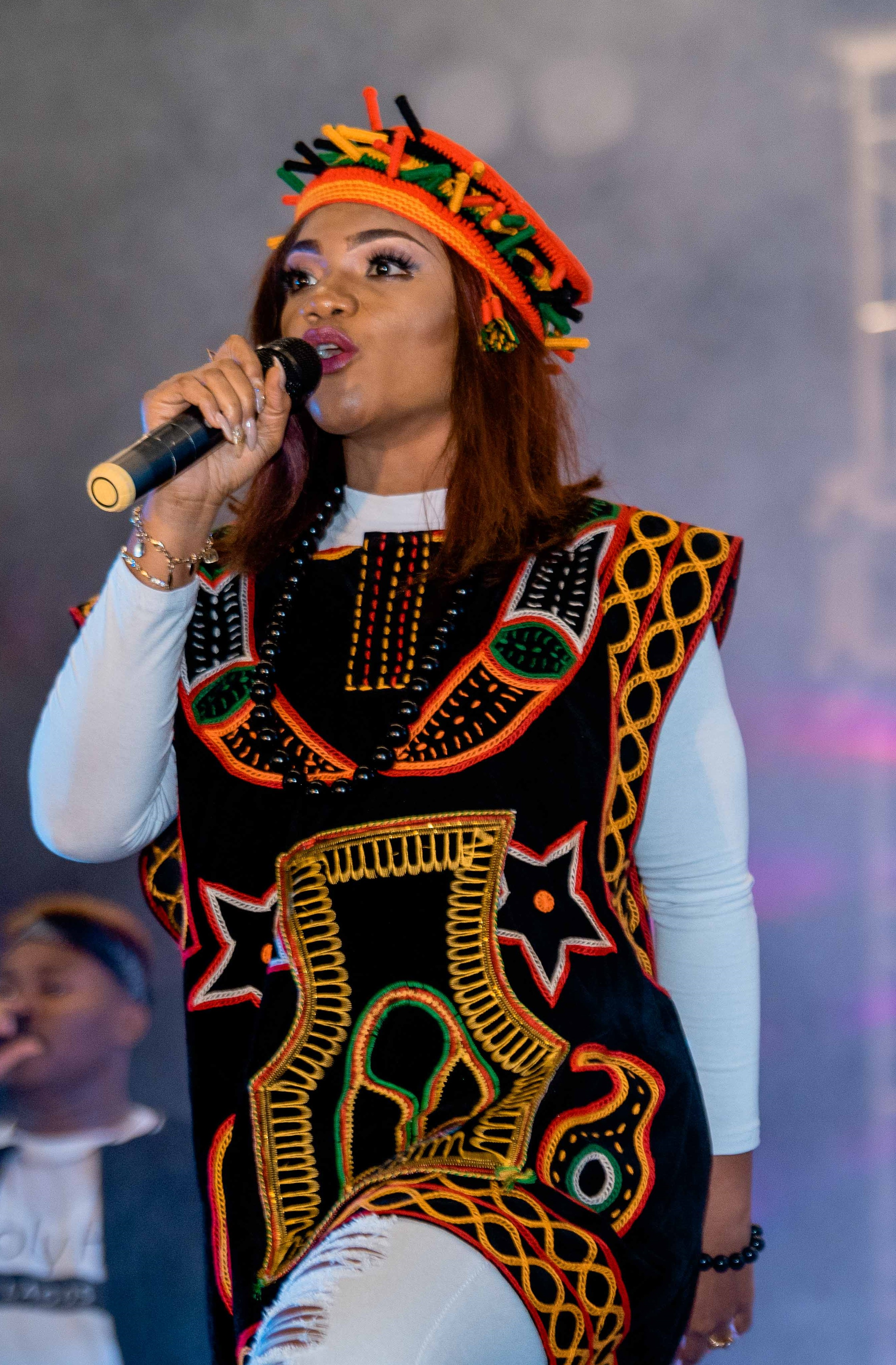
- Ehi performing in Douala, Cameroon, in February 2020

Background information
- Also known as: Ada
- Born: Ada Ogochukwu Ndukauba; September 18, 1983 (age 43)
- Genres: Contemporary gospel; pop; electronic; Afro pop
- Occupations: Singer-songwriter; recording artist
- Instrument: Vocals
- Years active: 2009–present
- Label: FreeNation INC; https://freenationinc.com
- Website: adaehi.com

YouTube information
- Genre: Music video
- Subscribers: 2.13 million
- Views: 587 million
- Last updated: March 26, 2025

Ada Ogochukwu Ehi// (née Ndukauba; born September 18, 1983) is a Nigerian gospel singer, songwriter, recording and performing artist. She started her musical career at the age of 10 as a backup singer for child star Tosin Jegede. Since she professionally started her music career under FreeNation INC in 2009, she has increasingly gained local and international popularity through her songs and music videos.

== Biography ==
=== Early and personal life ===
Ehi is a graduate of Lagos State University (B.Sc Chemical and Polymer Engineering). During her university days, she actively participated in the Believers Loveworld Campus Fellowship. Shortly after, she joined the Christ Embassy Choir and afterwards joined the FreeNation INC record label where she has since released her music and carried on in her professional career as a gospel artist.

Ehi joined FreeNation INC Records in 2009.

She met her husband, Moses Ehi at Christ Embassy church while in the university. They got married in the year 2008 and currently have two children.

=== Musical career ===
Since joining the Christ Embassy Choir, Ehi has been actively involved in the Music Ministry of Christ Embassy, and has ministered at Christ Embassy events in several programs around the world including in Europe, America and several African countries.

Her debut studio album Undenied was released in November 2009. Lifted and So Fly, a two-disc album, was released in November 2013. She released her third studio album, Future Now, on October 16, 2017. It claimed the number-one spot on iTunes Nigeria on the same day.

== Discography ==
=== Studio albums ===
- Undenied (2009)
- Lifted (2013)
- So Fly (2013)
- Future Now (2017)
- Ada's EP Vol 1 (2019)
- Born of God (2020)
- Consecrated (2024)
- Higher (2026)

=== Selected singles ===
sn	Single	Year released
1	Bobo Me	2012
2	Our God Reigns	2015
3	Only You Jesus	2016
4	I Testify	2016
5	Cheta	2016
6	Jesus (You are Able)	2016
7	I Overcame	2017
8	Like This	April 2019
9	Settled	February 2020
10	Fix My Eyes on You ft. Sinach	March 2020
11	Now	December 2020
12	Open Doors	September 2021
13	Another Miracle ft. Dena Mwana	July 2023
14	Gallant	2023
15	I Testify (Live) ft. Nathaniel Bassey	2024
16	Definitely	2024
17	Yes Sir ft. Mercy Chinwo	2024
18	Open Doors/On My Matter ft. Amb. Sis. Chinyere Udoma	2025
19	Otua ft Frank Edwards, Limoblaze	2025
20	I Live	2026
21	He Is Here ft Ibukun, 121SELAH	2026

== Awards and recognition ==
In 2017, Ehi was named on YNaija's list of "100 Influential Christian Personalities in Nigeria". She won the 2017 Groove Awards for West African Artist of the Year; being nominated alongside Frank Edwards, Sinach, Joe Praize and the Preachers. In 2019 "Only You" was listed as one of the 20 most viewed songs of the decade from Nigeria. On August 26, 2021, she received her first YouTube Plaque for reaching 1 million subscribers on YouTube.

== See also ==
- List of Igbo people
- List of Nigerian gospel musicians
- List of Nigerian musicians
