= Philip Thompson =

Philip Thompson may refer to:

- Philip Thompson (Kentucky politician) (1789–1836), U.S. Representative from Kentucky
- Philip B. Thompson Jr. (1845–1909), U.S. Representative from Kentucky
- Philip R. Thompson (1766–1837), U.S. Representative from Virginia
- Phil Thompson (born 1954), English footballer
- Phil Thompson (producer), UK producer and DJ

== See also ==
- Phillip Thompson (born 1988), Australian politician from Queensland
