= Iseoluwa Abidemi =

Nigerian gospel singer (born 2004)

- Born: Iseoluwa Abidemi; December 18, 2004 (age 21); Shimawa, Ogun State, Nigeria
- Genres: Gospel
- Occupations: Singer; Songwriter; Convener of Iseoluwa Concerts
- Years active: 2017–present
- Label: Wole Oni Music Production

Iseoluwa Abidemi (born 18 December 2004) is a Nigerian gospel singer, songwriter and the convener of Iseoluwa Concerts. Her mother discovered her music talent at the age of five and put her in her school choir providing backup and taking lead roles. She released her self-titled debut single Iseoluwa in 2017 and her debut album Yes I Can in 2019. She was named the African Music Personality of the Year (2019) by the Continental Child Summit and Awards in Africa.

== Life and music career ==
Abidemi was born in Shimawa, Ogun State, Nigeria as the eldest of three children. She attended Emerald Primary School before moving on to Chrisland High School. She started showing her music talent at home by singing along gospel tracks on television at the age of five. Her mother, a singer in her church discovered the talent and put her in her school choir taking lead and backup roles. In 2017, she released her debut single Iseoluwa and held her 2017 maiden live performance named The Iseoluwa Concert, which she also performed again in 2018. She released her debut album Yes I Can in 2019 with hit tracks such as Mo ti G'oke' and Just Praise produced by Wole Oni Music Production record label. She conducted another concert in 2019 in Lagos called the Iseoluwa Live In Concert to promote her new album. Abidemi explained that the purpose of the Yes I Can album is to tell young people that they should "believe in themselves and never give up at any point in time".

Abidemi has stated that while "music is my passion", she would also like to study law academically. She considers singers like Aṣa and Nathaniel Bassey her musical inspirations.
