= Fear God =

- Origin: Orange County, California
- Genres: Christian punk, Christian rock, punk rock
- Years active: 2012–present
- Labels: Thumper Punk
- Members: Doug Jutras

Fear God is an American Christian punk and Christian rock musical project, and the project primarily play punk rock. The project come from Orange County, California, while this project was started, in 2012, by Doug Jutras. The projects first release, with Thumper Punk Records, God Bless the World, Not Just America, a studio album, was released in 2012.

== Background ==
Fear God is a Christian punk and Christian rock musical project from Orange, California, where the only member is Doug Jutras.

== Music history ==
The musical project commenced as a musical entity in 2012, with their first release, God Bless the World, Not Just America, a studio album, that was released on November 20, 2012, by Thumper Punk Records. Jutras released, Miss That Walk, an extended play, on December 9, 2014, with Thumper Punk Records.

In 2020 it was awarded by ABGMA with the Music Video Award.

== Members ==
Current members

- Doug Jutras

== Discography ==
Studio albums

- God Bless the World, Not Just America (November 20, 2012, Thumper Punk)

EPs

- Miss That Walk (December 9, 2014, Thumper Punk)
