= Onos Ariyo =

Nigerian singer and songwriter

- Born: Onoriode Ebiere Bikawei
- Genre: Gospel
- Occupations: Singer, songwriter
- Years active: 2009–present
- Label: Onos Ariyo Music

Onoriode Ebiere Ariyo professionally known as Onos Ariyo is a Nigerian-based singer and songwriter. She made history November 2024 as the first gospel artist in Nigeria to be signed to Sony Music West Africa. she is best known for her critically acclaimed song "Alagbara" which was written & produced by Nigerian Music Producer Wilson Joel . In September 2018, she was listed in the Global Top 100 Most Influential People of African Descent (MIPAD).

== Early life ==
Onos was born in Delta State in Southern Nigeria where she had her primary and secondary school education after which she gained admission to the Delta State University, Abraka where she graduated with a bachelor's degree in French. Onos had begun singing while she was in primary school, being a part of a number of different choirs and groups before she moved to Lagos in 2004 where she began recording her first official single, "Dance" produced by FLO.

== Career ==
Sequel to the successful release of her debut single "Dance", Onos has gone on to headline several gospel concerts in Nigeria, including The Experience - Lagos, which has been described as the biggest gospel concert in the world, where she has shared the stage with a number of notable international gospel artistes, including Travis Greene, Kirk Franklin and Donnie McClurkin.
In 2010, Onos released her debut album Keep Moving, which featured the songs Dance and Na Your Love as well as Jamaican International gospel singer, Chevelle Franklyn, her big break, however, came with the release of her 2014 album No Limits, which featured the break out hits Alagbara and Everything Has Changed. The success of the album, as well as the single Alagbara, led to her nomination for several awards in the Gospel category.
In 2018, she began hosting a monthly live worship event titled B R E A T H E.
In 2017 she released her third studio album, Songs from the Place of Prayer to rave reviews.
On 28 July 2019, she released her fourth studio album, Breathe on music streaming service Boomplay.

== Awards and recognition ==
Onos has been nominated for a number of awards since her debut into the music industry. In 2012 she won the award for the Best Female Vocalist at the Nigeria Gospel Music Awards as well as at the Crystal Awards in 2013. In 2015, she won the Wise Women Awards in the Woman in Music category and Female Gospel Artist Of The Year Eloy Awards in the same year. She won the Female Artist of Excellence Award at the African Gospel Music Awards AGMMA in the UK in 2018.

In August 2018, Onos was hosted, alongside other MIPAD honorees by the Nigerian stock exchange at the Gong closing ceremony tagged "Celebration of Excellence". The event also had in attendance former Vice President of Nigeria, Namadi Sambo.

== Personal life ==
Onos is married to Kunmi Ariyo and they have two children.

== Discography ==
=== Albums ===
- Keep Moving (2010)
- No Limit (2014)
- Songs From The Place Of Prayer (2017)
- Breathe (2019)
- New Dimension (2022)
- Forever it is done (2024)

=== Singles ===
As lead artist
Year	Title	Album
2010	"Dance"	Keep Moving
2010	"Na Your Love"	Keep Moving
2014	"Alagbara"	No Limit
2014	"Everything Has Changed"	No Limit
2017	Jehovah Ebenezer	Songs from a Place of Prayer
2017	"You are Wonderful" (featuring Preye)	Songs from a Place of Prayer
2017	"Oghene me"	Songs from a Place of Prayer
2017	"Call His Name"	Songs from a Place of Prayer
2017	"Have Your Way"	Songs from a Place of Prayer
