= Antigua Barbuda Global Music & Media Awards =

Annual awards event

- Abbreviation: ABGMA
- Formation: 2014
- Founder: So Arise Music International
- Type: Annual awards event
- Headquarters: St. John's
- Location: Antigua & Barbuda
- Leader: Apostle Stanshaw Cornelius
- Website: www.soarisemusic.com/abgma.html

Antigua Barbuda Global Music & Media Awards (ABGMA) is an annual event in Antigua and Barbuda established by So Arise Music International in 2014, to celebrate and award talent in music and media. The festival promotes artistic excellence, community contributions, and cultural enrichment in Antigua and Barbuda and the region by extension.

Initially focused on gospel music, the ABGMA was founded on 2014 by Apostle Stanshaw Cornelius. It has since expanded to include multiple awards, such as the Legacy Ball & Media Awards and the Island Groove Awards, recognizing achievements in over 80 categories.

== Voting system ==
The festival employs an online voting system in more than 80 categories.

In addition to the public voting, there is a committee that evaluates nominees based on several criteria, including popularity, relevance to current trends, and the quality of information presented.

The founders established also the ABGMA Academy, which invites professionals from diverse creative fields to become Voting Members, actively participating in the nomination process.

== Categories ==
Award segments:

- Gospel Music Awards: Recognizes achievements in gospel music.
- Legacy Ball & Media Awards: Honors contributions to media and entertainment.
- Island Groove Awards: Celebrates national artists from Antigua and Barbuda.

== Notable recipients ==
- CeCe Winans
- Canton Jones
- Fear God
- Lisa E. Harris
- Sarah Téibo
- Sinach
- Mercy Chinwo
- Limoblaze
- Neon Adejo
- Sherwin Gardner
- Papa San
- George Nooks
- Chevelle Franklyn
- El-A-Kru
- Antigua.news
