= Frank Edwards (gospel musician) =

Nigerian Gospel musician (born 1989)

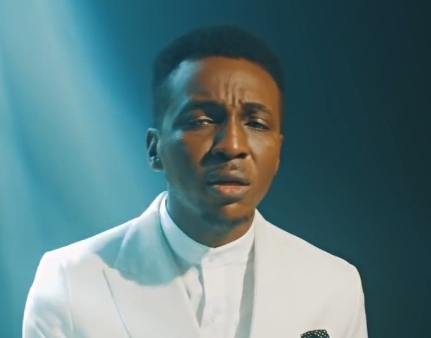

Background information
- Also known as: Richboy
- Born: Frank Ugochukwu Edwards; 22 July 1989 (age 37)
- Origin: Enugu State, Nigeria
- Genres: Christian hip hop; urban contemporary gospel; CCM; contemporary worship music; Gospel
- Occupations: Singer; songwriter; worship leader; musician; record producer; sound engineer
- Instruments: Vocals; piano; drums; guitar
- Years active: 2007–present
- Label: Rocktown
- Website: frankincense.world

Frank Ugochukwu Edwards (born 22 July 1989) is a Nigerian musician, record producer, sound engineer, worship singer and songwriter from Enugu State. He is the founder and owner of the record label Rocktown Records, which is home to recording artists such as Edwards himself, Gil Joe, King BAS, Nkay, Dudu and, among others. He lives in Lagos, Nigeria.

== Early life ==
Frank Ugochukwu Edwards was born into a family of seven in Enugu state of Nigeria. He has seven siblings. He began playing the piano when he was 7 and was self-taught. During his teenage years, he became a born again Christian. He has a lot of albums and many hit singles to his name. He has established himself as one of the best leading gospel artiste in Nigeria.

=== Musical career ===
Edwards is a producer and plays several musical instruments. He is a notable keyboardist. His debut album The Definition was released in 2008. It was a 14-track album and was distributed by Honesty Music. His second album Angels on the Runway was released in 2010, and his third album Unlimited was released in 2011. Tagjam was released in November 2011. In 2013, he appeared in the live performance of Sinach's "I know who I am" video. He is known for his high pitched voice. Besides being an artist with many songs that cover a variety of musical genres, he is also a music producer and a master mixer. As a result, Rocktown Records, which he owns, has a generation of upcoming talents including Gil Joe, King BAS, Nkay, and others. In 2016, he collaborated with American gospel artist Don Moen on an album Grace. His album Frankincense was produced in 2016. In 2018, he released an album for the Body of Christ titled Spiritual Music Season which includes songs like "Miyeruwe" (I Praise your Name), "You are Good", "Who dey run things" & "Praise Your Name". Also in 2018, he collaborated with Nathaniel Bassey (Thy Will Be Done) and Jeanine Zoe (I'm in Love with You).

=== Church life ===
Edwards (nicknamed Frankrichboy) is a member of House on the rock Church in Nigeria and the music director of house on the rock .

== Selected discography ==
=== Albums ===
- Definition (2008)
- Release Singles (2015)
- Frankincense (2016)
- Birthday EP (2016)
- Born in July (2017)
- Unlimited – Verse 1 (2017)
- I'm Supernatural (2018)
- In Love With You (2018)
- Unlimited – Verse 2 (2018)
- Born in July (2019)
- Believers Anthem (2020)
- No One Like You (2020)
- Melody Album (2022)
- afro gospel ep (2023)
- I AM EP (2024)
- Heart of Worship (2026)

== Selected videography ==
Year	Title	Director	Ref
2010	Beautiful		
2010	You Too Dey Bless Me feat. TB1	Gbenga Salu	
2011	Oya	Moshman	
2011	Oghene Doh	Moshman	
2011	This Love	Patrick Elis	
2014	Okaka	Lawrence Omo-Iyare	
2014	Hallelujah	Frank Edwards	
2015	Onye	St. Immaculate	
2016	Grace	Don Moen & Frank Edwards	
2017	Here to Sing feat. Chee	Frank Edwards	
2019	If Not For You	H2O Films	
2020	Believers Anthem	H2O Films	
2020	Suddenly	H2O Films	
2020	No Other Name	Frank Edwards	
2020	Logo	Frand Edwards	
2020	Opomulero	H2O Films	
2020	ME	H2O Films	

== Awards and nominations ==
In May 2011 he was nominated as the Gospel artiste of the year in the sixth annual Nigeria Entertainment Awards (NEA). He won the award of the best Gospel Rock artiste in the first annual awards. He also won west Africa best male vocalist in 2012/ best hit single at the Love World Awards 2012, and 3 awards at the Nigeria Gospel Music Awards (male artiste of the year, song of the year and best male vocal). His album Frankincense, which feat Micah Stampley and Nathaniel Bassey, topped Beyoncé's and Adele's albums within few hours of release on iTunes album chart.

== See also ==
- List of Nigerian gospel musicians
- List of Igbo people
