= The Hill (Travis Greene album) =

Studio album by Travis Greene
- Released: October 30, 2015
- Recorded: 2014–15
- Genre: Gospel, Christian contemporary, Christian

The Hill is the second studio album from American gospel singer Travis Greene. RCA Inspiration, a division of RCA Records released the album on October 30, 2015.

== Track listing ==
No.	Title	Length
1.	"Here For You"	7:18
2.	"Gave It All"	5:11
3.	"Intentional"	5:12
4.	"You Got Up"	5:44
5.	"Made a Way"	9:52
6.	"Thank You For Being God"	5:17
7.	"Who You Were"	5:14
8.	"The Hill (Album Only)"	10:51
9.	"You Keep Me" (featuring KJ Scriven & Laura Wilson)	5:16
10.	"Just Want You" (featuring Jordan Connell & Chandler Moore)	6:09
11.	"Soul Will Sing"	4:14
12.	"Love Me Too Much"	5:46

== Charts ==
Chart (2015)	Peak position
US Billboard 200	92
US Top Gospel Albums (Billboard)	1

=== Singles ===
Year	Title	Chart	Peak position
2015	"Intentional"	US Hot Gospel Songs (Billboard)	1
2016	"Made a Way"	US Hot Gospel Songs (Billboard)	1
