= Gbenga Salu =

Nigerian filmmaker

- Born: 1981 (age 44–45); Lagos, Nigeria
- Citizenship: Nigeria
- Occupations: Film director, Film editor, Visual editor

Oluwagbenga Adedoyin Salu, who is simply known as Gbenga Salu, is a Nigerian film director, film editor and visual effects artist.

On 22 December 2024, Gbenga Salu released A Christmas Story in Kingston, a short film set in Kingston, Ontario. The film follows a teenager and her friends during the holiday season. It was produced by Temitope Salu and written and directed by Gbenga Salu, and was released through Creatopia Studios, an Ontario-based film production company.

Gbenga studied film making at the London Film Academy. Some of the Awards he has won includes:

- Best Special Effects/editing- Soundcity Music Video Awards (SMVA) - 2008
- Most Promising Director- Nigerian Music Video Awards (NMVA) - 2009

== Naijafootballers ==
In 2017, Gbenga founded Naijafootballers, an online platform that curates stories about Nigerian football and footballers.

The Naijafootballers platform also gave birth to The Ballers Awards; an event that celebrates the best of Nigerian football. The test edition was held in 2018, it was hosted by Murphy Ijemba, while the maiden edition was on 12 January 2020. The second edition was hosted by FunnyBone and Debola Adebanjo, while the latest edition has Simi Drey and Emmanuel Sabastine has its hosts.

== Personal life ==
He is married to Temitope-Gbenga Salu (née Oshofisan) who is also a graduate of accounting from the University of Lagos. She is also a professional actress, voice over artiste and writer.

He is based in Ontario, Canada.

== Music videos ==
His music video works include:

- Ten ten - Mohits Allstars
- Omoba - D'Prince
- TWO Legit, Believe in me and Atewo - T.W.O (Tunde and wunmi Obe)
- Tinko Angel - Jaywon
- Viva Africa - Fela Anikulapo-Kuti
- Change your parade - Lynxxx
- Ayeole and six feet - Infinity
- Omo Jayejaye - Lagbaja

== Films ==
- A Christmas Story in Kingston
- Idawa (Short) - Best Experimental short, North America - Couch Film Festival
- Convictus (Short) - Nominated for best short African Magic Viewers Choice Award 2023
- A Simple Plan (Short)
- 10:10 (Web Mini-series) - Runner up - Afrinolly Movie Awards
- Schemers (Feature Film)
- True Scarlet (TV Series)
