= Bidemi Olaoba =

Nigerian gospel singer

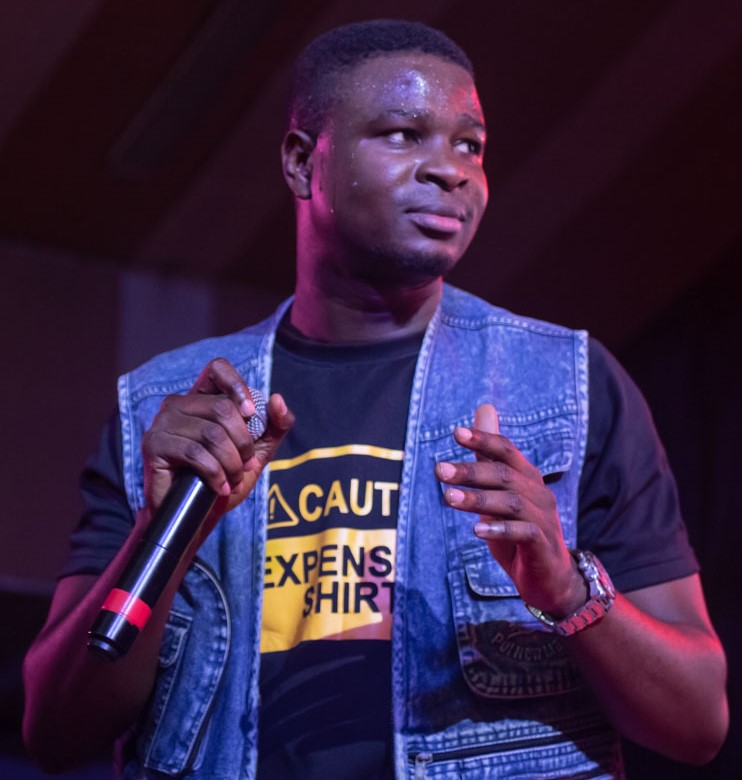

Background information
- Born: Abidemi Ayodeji Ogunmolu; October 25, 1991 (age 34)
- Origin: Ikale, Okitipupa, Ondo State, Nigeria
- Occupations: Singer-songwriter; worship leader
- Years active: 2012- present
- Label: Olaoba Entertainment

Abidemi Ayodeji Ogunmolu, also known as Bidemi Olaoba, is a Nigerian gospel singer, songwriter and music composer. He is known for singing Gospel HighLife music in a Fuji Style.

== Early life ==
Olaoba was born to a Christian home and a family of six in Lagos, Nigeria. He comes from Ikale Okitipupa, Ondo State. Bidemi studied Civil Engineering at the Yaba College Of Technology, Lagos and Economics at the University Of Lagos, Nigeria.

== Musical career ==
Olaoba Started his musical career as a worship leader in the choir at Christ Apostolic Church and became involved in the CAC Music Ministry and Redeemed Christian Church of God. After beginning his official career, Olaoba released his first single, "Final Say", in 2016. He became known for his popular phrase "The Bible Says".

Olaoba was invited to perform Marathon Praise, an event organized by the Redeemed Christian Church of God, and then gained popularity. He has six studio singles, two live performance compilations, and collaborations with gospel artists. Olaoba travelled to Europe, America and African nations, he held virtual concerts and is the pioneer of the virtual concert Unrestricted Praise, which started in 2020 and featured gospel artists including Buchi, Tope Alabi, Mike Abdul, Adeleke Adeboye, Eben, and Samie Okposo.Bidemi Olaoba performed at the Experience 19, which is a highly anticipated annual international gospel concert with the theme “Jesus Wins,” marked another unforgettable event in the 2024

Olaoba performed at Nigeria's biggest gospel gatherings, including the Marathon Messiah's Praise concert by the Redeemed Christian Church Of God, Festival Of Life (Dubai, Dublin, Italy and United Kingdom), MASS, HI-impact Praise, and COZA.

== Discography ==
=== Studio albums ===
- Final Say (2016)
- Bonjour (2017)
- My Life (2018)
- Baba (2019)
- Holy Gyration (2020)
- Niwaju Oluwa (2024)
- Gbe mi fo (2024)
- Give me chance (2024)
- Isi Gini (2024)
- Prayer (2024)
- Tehillah (2025)

=== Live performance compilation albums ===
- Winning Praise (2019)
- Mass (2020)

== Videography ==
sn	Video	Year released
1	Bonjour	2018
2	Baba	2019
3	Akanchawa	2020
