= Happi (musician) =

British-Nigerian music producer and composer (born 1993)

- Also known as: HappiMusic
- Born: Mark Babatunde; 8 February 1993 (age 33); Hackney, London
- Origin: British-Nigerian
- Genres: Afrobeats; R&B; hip-hop
- Occupations: Singer; composer; record producer
- Years active: 2014–present
- Spouse: Dana Babatunde

Mark Babatunde (born 8 February 1993), professionally known as Happi or HappiMusic, is a British-Nigerian singer, music producer, songwriter and composer. He is best known for "Jireh (My Provider)" with Limoblaze and Lecrae, which won several awards and appeared on the Billboard Year-End U.S. Afrobeats Songs of 2022.

== Early life ==
Happi was born in Hackney, London to Nigerian parents who moved to the United Kingdom shortly after they got married. They later moved to Enfield before he started secondary school. Happi's musical career started when he was a child at the age of 6. He attended Einfield Grammar School and studied Marketing and Advertising at the University of Hertfordshire, England. As a teenager, he started to record in his brother's bedroom studio. With time, he opened a YouTube channel where he uploaded homemade videos.

== Music career ==
Happi first started writing songs and making videos as a child. In 2014, he released 3 singles "Be Alright", "No Man Can Curse" and "Truth Be Told". In 2016, he was featured on the Blackout EP by Komenz alongside Melvillous. It comprised 6 tracks including "Scars", "Walls" and "Voices". In 2017, he debuted his EP "The Boy and His Imaginary Friend EP" stylised BAHIF which premiered with UK's Notion Notion Magazine. It comprised 6 tracks and had a headline show on 30 April 2017 in London, United Kingdom. He worked as one of the co-producers on Moelego's debut EP titled "Me" in 2020.

On 1 July 2022, Happi produced the hit song "Jireh (My Provider)" by Limoblaze featuring American rapper, Lecrae. The song appeared on the list of Billboard Year-End U.S. Afrobeats Songs of 2022 and also peaked as No. 15 on the Official Charts. On 7 October 2022, he released an official remix with British group Flo on the Cardboard box (Happi remix).

== Discography ==
=== Albums/EPs ===
Album/EPs	Year	Ref
Blackout EP (Komenz)	2016	
Boy and His Imaginary Friend	2017	
3:15	2018	
Me (Moelogo)	2020	

=== Singles ===
Title	Year	Album
Comatose	2023	Non-album single
Wasted	2023	Non-album single
Jireh (My Provider) (Limoblaze, Lecrae)	2022	Sunday in Lagos
Cardboard Box Remix (HappiMusic X Flo)	2022	Non-album single
Medication (ft Tra$hGho$t)	2022	Non-album single
H3lp	2022	Non-album single
Bad Bad	2022	Non-album single
Anxiety	2022	Non-album single
Public Enemy	2022	Non-album single
Ride or Die	2022	Non-album single
Sinking Feeling	2022	Non-album single
Terminal	2022	Non-album single
Twisted	2021	Non-album single
Bestfriend	2021	Non-album single
Fool For You	2021	Non-album single
For Me	2021	Non-album single
Private Caller, Who Dis?	2021	Non-album single
Right or Wrong (Happi, Britt Lari)	2021	Non-album single
Bel-Air	2020	Non-album single
Sorry (Happi, Imallryt)	2020	Non-album single
Tick	2019	Non-album single
Remedy	2019	Non-album single
Forever	2017	Boy and His Imaginary Friend
Be Alright	2014	Non-album single
No Man Can Curse	2014	Non-album single
Truth Be Told	2014	Non-album single

== Awards and nominations ==
Year	Award	Category	Result	Ref
2023	The Stellar Awards	Rap/Hip-Hop Song of the Year	Pending	
2023	The Headies	Best Inspirational Song	Nominated	
	Premier Gospel Awards	Best Song	Won	
2020	Royal Television Society Craft & Design Awards	Music - Original Score	Nominated	
