= Sarah Téibo =

English-Nigerian singer

- Born: Sarah Miébo Téibo; London, England
- Genres: Christian R&B, urban contemporary gospel, contemporary R&B
- Occupations: Singer, songwriter, author
- Instrument: vocals
- Years active: 2015–present
- Website: sarahteibo.co.uk

Sarah Miébo Téibo is an English-Nigerian singer, with two urban contemporary gospel music albums, Walk with Me (2016) and Keep Walking (2018). She was nominated for a MOBO Award.

== Early life and background ==
Téibo, the second of four children, was born in London, United Kingdom, to Nigerian parents. As a child, she returned with her parents to Nigeria where she started singing in her church's youth choir and eventually returned to the UK after getting married in 2007.

== Music career ==
Her music recording career started in 2015, with the single, "Steal My Joy", eventually releasing a studio album, Walk with Me, on 8 May 2016. For this, she received a nomination at the MOBO Awards for Best Gospel. In June 2018, she released her second album ‘Keep Walking’ which featured Gospel Legend, Fred Hammond and peaked at number 3 in the Official Christian & Gospel charts.

After signing to eOne Nashville's IndieBlue music arm, she released ‘Spirit Come’ the first single from her forth coming album set for release in 2021

In December 2020, she released her first Christmas single 'Hear the Sound' as a charity release in support of UK charity Colourful Beginnings, to support families with premature babies in NICU across the UK

In 2022, she won the ABGMA Song of the Year Award with the song «Secure».

== Author ==
She is the author of the book, Sex Interrupted, published in 2011.

== Discography ==
- Walk with Me (8 May 2016)
- Keep Walking (29 June 2018)
- Spirit Come (28 August 2020)
- Hear the Sound (18 December 2020)
