= Lighthill Music =

Nigerian musical ensemble

Lighthill Music is a Nigerian gospel group. Based in Lagos, the ensemble was formed in 2021.

== Background ==
Established by Faleye Olusola John, with the sole aim of discovering and developing gospel artists. Independent Nigeria wrote that "LightHill Music has spread wide with success and the community is ever growing."

Prior to its establishment, Lighthill Music collaborated with Access Bank plc on talent discovery and unveiling of its artist.

In 2023, Lighthill Music released "Anyi Abiawo" with Okeychuks featuring Mercy Chinwo, and a follow up single entitled "No Weapon" an afro-gospel song in collaboration with Ify Benson, which it’s dance routine became known on social media.

Lighthill Music signed a licensing contract with DistroKid to distribute their music to streaming services.

The community released "Lifter of My Head", Its official video was premiered on Trace Gospel TV. In 2023, Lighthill Music songs received rational air-plays on various radio stations across Nigeria.

== Current acts ==
This list contains seasonal artists.

- Mercy Chinwo
- IBK
- Ify Benson
- Rejoice Eweama
- Okeychuks

== Awards and nominations ==
List of awards and nominations received by Lighthill Music
Organization	Year	Award	Recipient or nominee	Result	Ref.
Kingdom Achievers Awards	2024	Best Contemporary Crew	LightHill Music	Nominated	
Kingdom Achievers Awards	2024	Afro Gospel Song of the Year	"No weapon" (with Ify Benson)	Nominated	
