= Minister GUC =

Nigerian gospel musician

- Born: Gift Ugochi Christopher; 8 October 1993 (age 32); Port Harcourt, Rivers State
- Genres: gospel, contemporary worship
- Occupations: Songwriter, Gospel Musician
- Instrument: Vocals
- Years active: 2019-present
- Label: EeZee Conceptz

Gift Ugochi Christopher (born 8 October 1993) is a Nigerian singer, musician and gospel songwriter popularly known by his stage name Minister GUC. He gained recognition following the release of his first album in December 2020 with the hit tracks All that matters, Desperate and Yours. He officially began his music career in 2019 after he was signed to EeZee Conceptz, a Nigerian gospel record label.

== Early life and education ==
GUC was born on October 8, 1993, in Port Harcourt and originally hails from Emuoha Local Government Area, Rivers State.

== Music career ==
He started his musical career in Port Harcourt as part of a music team with his friends In November 2019, GUC was signed to the record label, EeZee Conceptz to join Mercy Chinwo, Judikay and other gospel artistes. He released his debut album in 2020 titled "The Message" comprising 12 tracks including All that matters, Desperate, Yours and God of Vengeance. In October 2020, GUC topped the list of gospel artistes in Nigeria to reach the highest views that same year on YouTube.

== Personal life ==
GUC is currently married to Nkpoikana Ntuk (Nene Ntuk). The couple held their traditional wedding on 4 November 2021 and their white wedding on 6 March 2021 in Port Harcourt, Rivers State. On 6 March 2022, exactly one year after their marriage, the couple announced the birth of their daughter and first child.

== Discography ==
=== Albums ===
Title	Details
The Message	Date Released: 4 December 2020; Number of songs: 12; Label: Eezee Conceptz; Format: Digital Download, Streaming, CD
To Yahweh's Delight	Date Released: 29 April 2022; Number of songs: 13; Label: Eezee Conceptz; Format: Digital Download, Streaming, CD

=== Singles ===
- The Bill (2020)
- In this place (2021)
- Through Eternity (2022)
- Yahweh Remix (2022)
- Goodness of God (2023)
- Ikechi (2023)

== Awards and achievements ==
Title	Year	Category	Result	Reference
Maranatha Gospel Awards	2020	Best Breakthrough Male Minister Africa	Won	
CLIMA Africa	2021	Gospel Song of the year	Nominated	
CLIMA Africa	2021	Songwriter of the year	Nominated	
CLIMA Africa	2021	Discovery of the year	Nominated	
Beatz Award	2022	Afro Gospel Producer Of The Year "Omemma" by Eezee Conceptz	Nominated	
