= Paul Adefarasin =

Nigerian pastor and televangelist (born 1963)

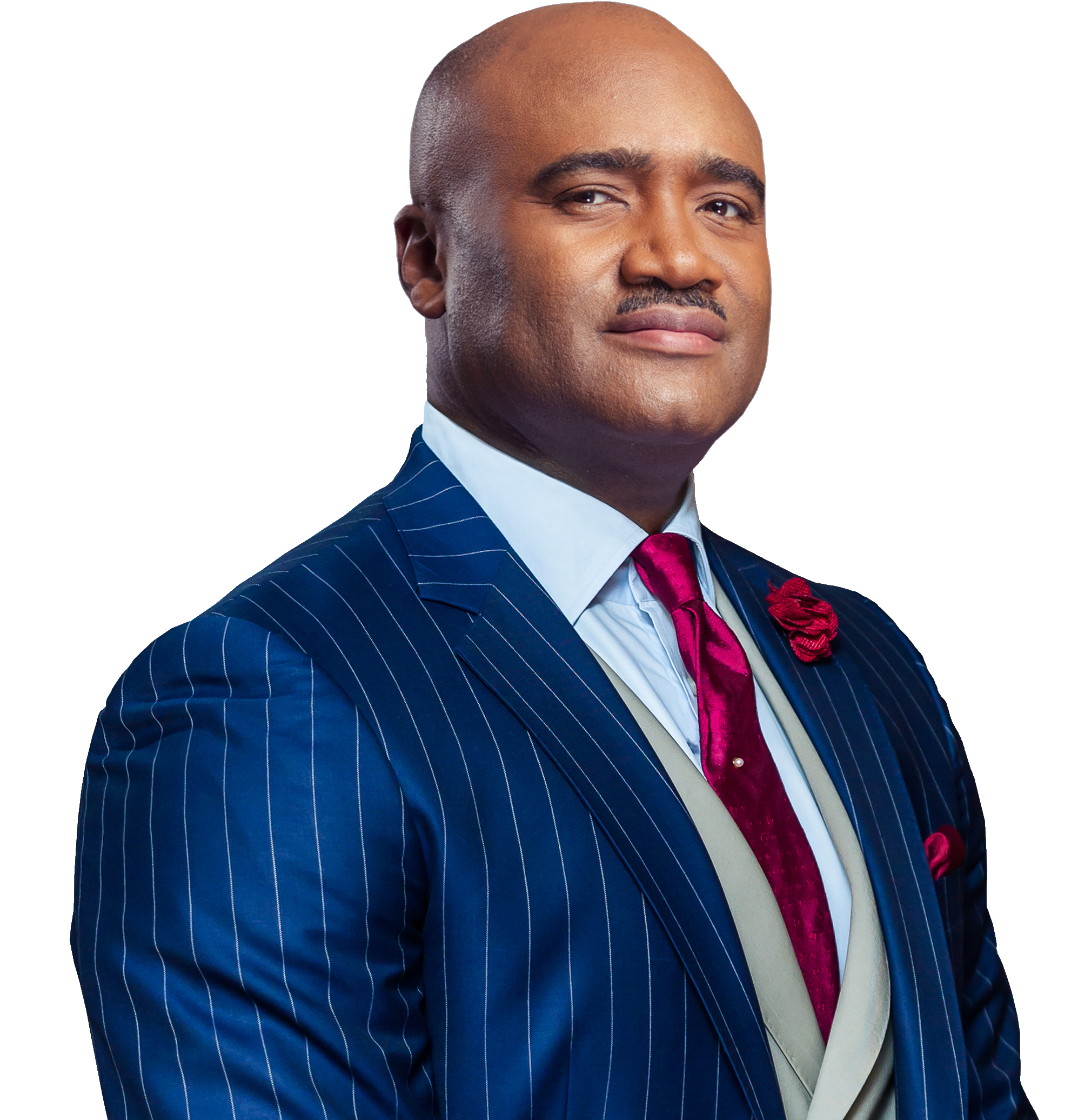
- Born: 25 January 1963 (age 63); Nigeria
- Occupations: Minister, Pastor, Televangelist
- Title: The Metropolitan Senior Pastor
- Spouse: Ifeanyi Adefarasin
- Children: 3
- Parents: Joseph Adefarasin (father); Hilda Adefarasin (mother)

Paul Adeolu Adefarasin (born 25 January 1963) is a Nigerian pastor and televangelist. He is the Prelate and Metropolitan Senior Pastor of the House on the Rock church headquartered in Lagos, Nigeria, with branches in several cities across Nigeria including Port Harcourt and Abuja, as well as in Johannesburg, South Africa and London, United Kingdom. He is also the Convener and Host of The Experience (gospel concert).

== Early life ==
Adefarasin was raised primarily in Nigeria, in a traditional Christian background. In the early 1980s, he moved to the United States for his tertiary education, where he struggled with substance abuse for three years, an experience he openly admits left him feeling empty inside, before he became born again.

== Career ==
Adefarasin attended St Saviour's School in Ikoyi, and Igbobi College in Yaba. His secondary school education was in Haileybury College in England. He went on to study at the University of Miami, graduating with a Bachelor of Architecture. While practicing what he studied in Florida, he served in a volunteer capacity as a youth pastor, before eventually leaving America to return to Nigeria on his birthday in January 1990.

Within days of returning to Nigeria in January 1990, random members of a local church in Lagos proceeded to invite him over. Their resident pastor would later get a witness in his heart that Adefarasin would serve in any capacity, which he duly obliged for just under a year. Then Adefarasin was subsequently asked by another Christian leader to become the resident pastor of a U.K. church, so he travelled to U.K. where he received his first pastorate at the Action Chapel, London, subsequently serving there for three years and taking the church from about 17 people to just under 500 ardent worshippers. In the process he was studying at the International Bible Institute of London where he eventually received a Diploma in Christian Ministry.

Towards the end of 1993, Adefarasin, having returned from the United States and the United Kingdom, went to Lagos, Nigeria, in an attempt to renew his permit at the U.K. High Commission. However, the renewal process was unexpectedly delayed, prompting him to return to Nigeria permanently. In the following year, under divine inspiration, he co-founded the House on the Rock Church in Lagos in July 1994, alongside a few others.

=== Book publications ===
Adefarasin has written, authored, and self-published over 20 motivational Christian mini-books and multimedia resources. Three of his books have been published by Christian book publishers and distributors.

== Personal life ==
In June 1995, Adefarasin married Ifeanyi Adefarasin (born 16 September 1972), a former beauty queen and now a respected minister and conference speaker well known for her clear and practical message of hope and empowerment. Together, they have three children.

As of 2023, Adefarasin credits T.D. Jakes as his mentor and spiritual father.
