= Joseph Adefarasin =

Nigerian lawyer and judge (1921–1989)

Honourable Justice Joseph Adefarasin
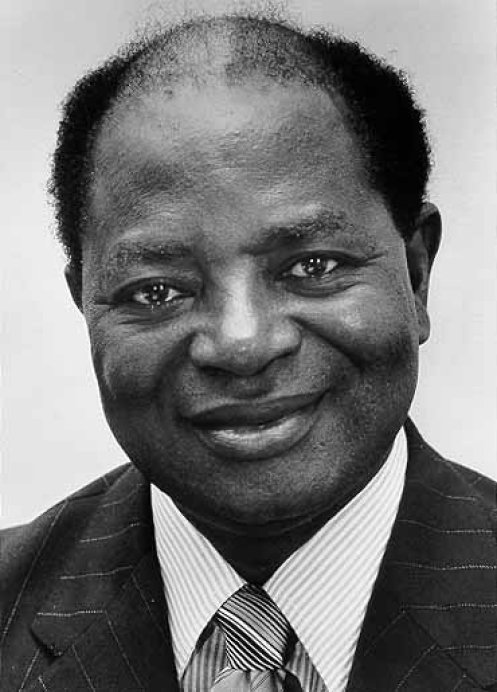

Chief Judge of Lagos
- In office 1 November 1974 – 24 April 1985

President of International Federation of Red Cross and Red Crescent Societies
- In office 1977–1981

Personal details
- Born: Joseph Adetunji Adefarasin; 24 April 1921 Ijebu Ode, Nigeria
- Died: 28 March 1989 (aged 67)
- Citizenship: Nigerian
- Spouse: Hilda Adefarasin
- Children: Wale Adefarasin; Bola Adefarasin; Yinka Ogundipe; Michael Adeyemi Adefarasin; Paul Adefarasin
- Education: University of London
- Awards: Henry Dunant Medal

Joseph Adetunji Adefarasin (24 April 1921 – 28 March 1989) was a Nigerian lawyer and High Court judge. He was one of the foremost students of Igbobi College, Yaba, Lagos from 1932 to 1939 and studied law at University of London from 1946 to 1949. Joseph Adefarasin was the Second Chief Judge of Lagos from 1 November 1974 to 24 April 1985.

He was the President of the International Federation of Red Cross and Red Crescent Societies from 1977 to 1981. He was the first African to hold this position and was awarded the Henry Dunant Medal, which is the highest World Red Cross award.

He was married to Hilda Adefarasin. They had five children including Wale Adefarasin, Bola Adefarasin, Yinka Ogundipe, Michael Adeyemi Adefarasin and Paul Adefarasin.

Non-profit organization positions
| Preceded by José Barroso Chávez | President of the International League of Red Cross and Red Crescent Societies; 1977–1981 | Succeeded by Enrique de la Mata |
