= Hilda Adefarasin =

Nigerian women's right activist (1925–2023)

- Born: 9 January 1925; Lagos, British Nigeria
- Died: 5 February 2023 (aged 98)
- Occupation: Nurse
- Spouse: Hon Justice Joseph Adetunji Adefarasin (w. 1989)
- Children: 5 including Paul Adefarasin

Hilda Adefarasin (9 January 1925 – 5 February 2023) was a Nigerian women's rights activist who was the president of the National Council of Women's Societies (NCWS). She left her nursing profession in 1969 to concentrate on professional activities of the NCWS. In 1971, she was the council's treasurer and in 1987, she became the president.

== Early life ==
Hilda Adefarasin was born in Lagos to the family of Wilford and Ethel Petgrave in 1925. Her father, who was born in Jamaica, worked with the Nigerian Railway in Lagos and her mother (née Ambleston) was born in Antigua. Adefarasin attended CMS Girls' School Lagos. She also attended Achimota College, Ghana. In 1945, she became pupil-midwife with Massey Street Hospital but in 1948, she traveled to England, where she qualified as a registered nurse in 1951. In 1960, she was a founding member and secretary of the Professional Association of Trained Nurses of Nigeria and soon joined the National Council of Women's Societies as a representative of nurses. In 1971, she became the council's treasurer, holding that position until 1980. In 1984, Adefarasin succeeded Justice Nzeako as president of NCWS. Her selection continued a string of educated elite women presidents of NCWS. Adefarasin felt the forum was an association of varied women with diverse professional interests who create awareness for women's recognition in national life and nation building. The NCWS during her tenure promoted an Expanded Programme on Immunization and operational theatres for young girls with vesico vaginal fistula.

Adefarasin was one out of two women who were nominated by president Ibrahim Babangida as members of the 1986 Political Bureau.

=== Personal life and death ===
Adefarasin was married to Hon. Justice Joseph Adetunji Adefarasin. She is the mother of Wale Adefarasin, Adebola Adefarasin, Yinka Ogundipe, Michael Adeyemi Adefarasin and Paul Adefarasin. She celebrated her ninetieth birthday on 1 November 2015.

Adefarasin died on 5 February 2023, at the age of 98.
