= Tosin Jegede =

Nigerian singer

Tosin Jegede is a Nigerian singer. She was a child singing sensation in the 1980s. After releasing her first album in 1985: Children Arise at age five, she released two more albums: Leaders of Africa and Children of Africa in 1989 and 1992 respectively. She left the country to further her education and earned a degree in Business Decision and Analysis from the University of Bristol and worked briefly in the UK as a Pension Adviser. She returned to Nigeria in 2008.

Tosin's mother died in 2012. She started a pet project: One Book One Child which focuses on the future of the Nigerian child.

== Discography ==
- Children Arise (1985)
- Leaders of Africa (1989)
- Children of Africa (1992)
