= Gordons (comedian) =

Nigerian comedian, actor and musician (born 1979)

Godwin Komone
- Born: Godwin Komone; 25 December
- Other name: Gordons
- Education: Delta State University

Comedy career
- Years active: 2005–present
- Medium: Stand-up comedy
- Genre: Satire
- Subjects: Nigerian culture; Church; Popular culture; Lifestyle; Current events

Godwin Komone better known by his stage name Gordons is a Nigerian comedian, musician and actor. He is also the host of the comedy series Comedy Clinic

== Early life ==
Gordons is a native of Warri in Delta State in Nigeria and spent most of his formative years there. According to him, his parents separated when he was 3 months old and was raised by his grandmother. Both his parents after separation later went on to remarry.

== Education and career ==
Gordons is a graduate of Delta State University where he studied Integrated science. He started out his music in the choir at World of Life Bible Church and later was part of the music group DC Envoys before his foray into comedy which he started in 2005 when he moved to Lagos from Warri.

== Personal life ==
Comedian Gordons is currently married and has four children with his wife who he dated while they were both at Delta State University.
