= Murphy Ijemba =

Nigerian radio personality

- Born: Murphy Ijemba; Mushin, Lagos State
- Education: Bayero University
- Presenting career
- Show: RUSH HOUR
- Station: 102.3 MAX FM
- Network: TVC Communications
- Time slot: 6:00 – 10:00p.m. Monday–Friday
- Style: Sports presenter
- Country: Nigeria

Murphy Ijemba is a Nigerian radio personality who anchors the RUSH HOUR show on 97.7 METRO FM. His radio anchoring style has since won him several nominations and accolades at award ceremonies in Nigeria.

== Early life and education ==
He is Igbo. He was born in Mushin, a suburb of Lagos State in the southwestern region of Nigeria, where he went on to complete his primary and secondary school education and was a member of cultural and drama group. He holds a B.Sc certificate in Accounting after graduating from Bayero University, Kano. In an interview with Emmanuel Tobi of The New Telegraph, he revealed that he had to sell chickens in order to financially support his education. He lost his father at a very early age of 3 to 4 years. he was trained by his mother who had three children and his grandfather.

== Career ==
He started his radio career as a presenter at Raypower FM in Kano under Daar Communications where he worked for 5 years. He joined Brila FM in 2011 where he developed in his craft before he quit the radio station in 2017 upon tendering his resignation letter citing the need to improve his "capacity academically and professionally". He is a brand ambassador for 360Bet and Zutasia.

He was a member of the Student Union Government. He was the spokes person for his group who got interviewed on Tv and on radio by Mallam Dikko on an excursion to Ray Power, Daar communication

== Personal life ==
Murphy speaks Yoruba, Igbo and Hausa fluently. He is a brand ambassador for Zutasia and 360bet and a member of Nigeria Guild of Actors.

== Awards and nominations ==
Year	Event	Prize	Result	Ref
2012	Nigerian Broadcasters Merit Awards	Most Popular Radio Sportscasters	Won	
2013	Nigerian Broadcasters Merit Awards	Most Popular Radio Sportscasters	Won	
2015	Nigerian Broadcasters’ Nite	Most Popular Radio Sportscasters	Won	
2016	3rd Nigeria Pitch Awards	Football Journalist of The Year	Nominated	
