= Mike Aremu =

Nigerian jazz musician

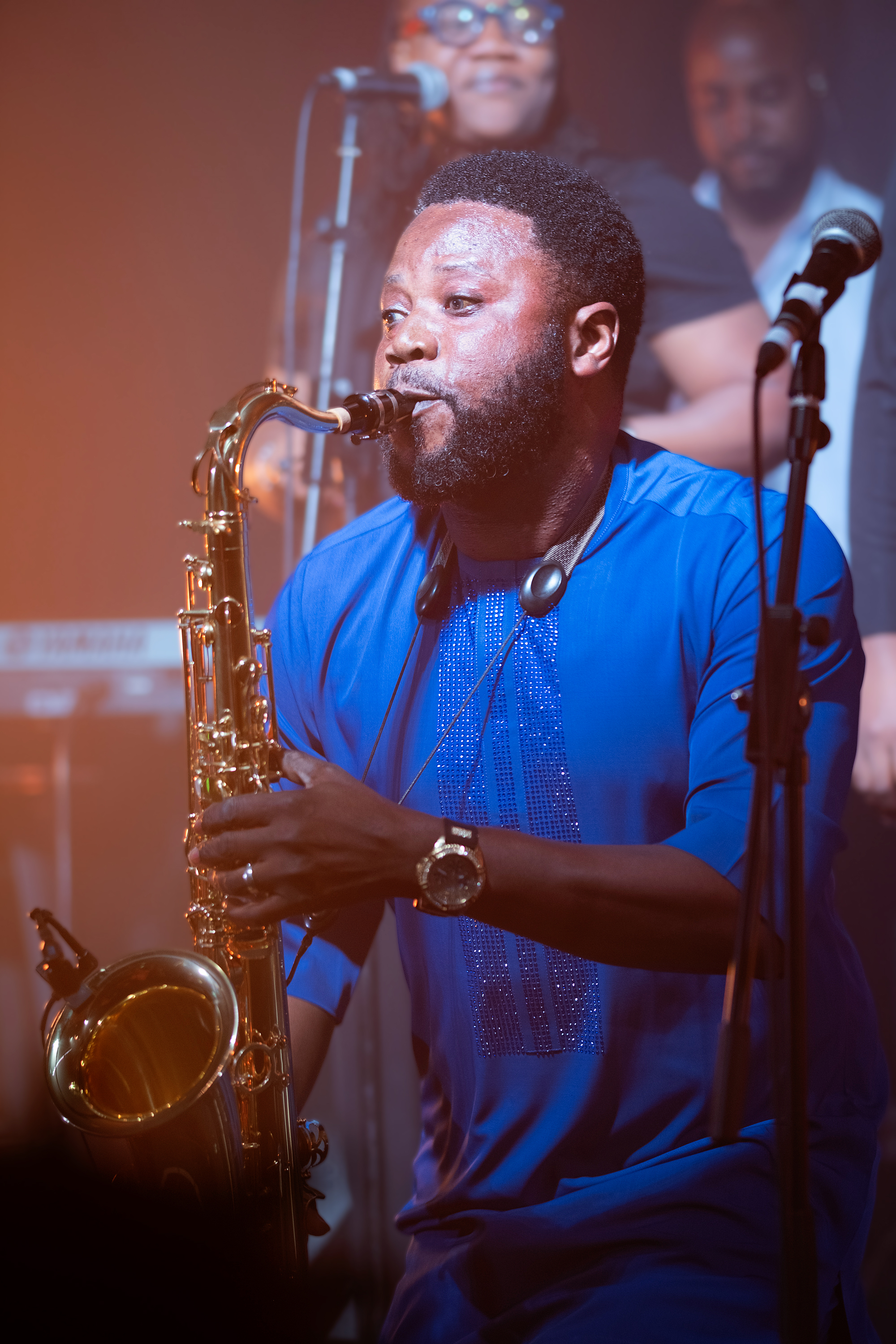
- Mike Aremu at SXSW London 2026
- Born: Mike Aremu; Niger State, Nigeria
- Occupations: Saxophonist, composer, recording artist, music minister
- Website: www.mikearemu.com

Mike Aremu is a Nigerian Afro jazz saxophone player. His music draws from traditional Nigerian music.

== Early life ==
At 8 years old, in Niger State, Nigeria, at his local church he started playing musical instruments. He was a member of the Boys Brigade band. In 1995, with some basic lessons, he concentrated on the saxophone. A year later, he became a member of House on the Rock's music team playing alongside Nigerian gospel artist Sammie Okposo, Agboola Shadare, Gbenga Owoeye-Wise and others. He had a series of appearances at venues in Nigeria including Pintos, The Green Lion, Club Towers, K's Place and Mega Plaza's Dome. He completed session work for Onyeka Onwenu, Nigerian reggae artist Ras Kimono and Fuji music artist Wasiu Ayinde Marshall.

== Career ==
He signed a three-year contract (that lasted for four years) record deal with Kennis Music Label, Nigeria's largest record label during this period and released two chart-topping albums "Dance" (1999) and "No Shaking" (2002) jointly selling more than 1.5 million copies. He has also recorded two songs for the Christian Broadcasting Network in the United States.

Aremu has performed with Kenny G, Hugh Masakela, India Arie, Najee, Kirk Franklin, Israel Houghton, Donnie McClurklin, Marvin Winans, Ron Kenoly, Mary Mary, and Travis Greene. He made an appearance at the John F. Kennedy Center in Washington DC. He has worked with UK-based author, pastor, gospel artist, Abraham Adeshile Great when the latter released the gospel music titled Next Level.

He performed in London at The Barbican and Ocean as part of the annual Awesome Praise concerts. Aremu also performed at the London Festival of Life (FOL) twice, an event that was attended by over 40,000 people at the Excel Centre, London on 28 March 2008 and 18 October 2013.

Aremu performed nine times at the (2006 to 2017) Experience, with the 2010 Experienceattracting a crowd of over 600,000 at the Tafawa Balewa Square, Lagos.

The debut concert of his four-month tour in the United Kingdom at the Jazz Café in October 2008 sold out. In 2013 Mike Aremu released his current top selling and 3rd Album "Coat of many Colours" recorded in London, off the back of which he toured Europe appearing again at the Jazz Cafe London and the PizzaExpress Jazz Club amongst others.

== Sax Appeal ==
Aremu is the organizer of the largest jazz concert in Nigeria, Sax Appeal. This is geared towards the promotion of live musical performances in Nigeria. This concert, held annually since 2010 with the latest edition that held; November 2014 at Transcorp Hilton Abuja, has been aimed at fostering interaction between sponsoring organizations, businessmen and entrepreneurs in an entertainment environment. Sax Appeal has featured artists like Indie Arie, Kenny G, Judith Sephuma, Kunle Ayo, Yolanda Brown, Hugh Masakela, Marvin Winans, Mary Mary, Timi Dakolo, Cobhams, Waje, Jessy J, Agboola Shadare, Yinka Davies, Tosin Martins, Bez, Cobhams Asuquo, Waje and others.
This event has brought together entrepreneurs in Nigeria including Donald Duke, Aliko Dangote and Babatunde Fashola.

== Awards ==
Aremu's work has been recognized by the music industry with an African Gospel Music Award, a TOMA Award (Today's Gospel Music Awards) and an AMEN Award for Best Instrumental Album of the Year and Best Gospel Music Video of the Year.

He was also nominated twice at the Kora Awards in 2003 and at JCI's TOYP (Ten Outstanding Young People) for best self-developed personality.

He won in four categories at the 2014 MEGA Awards (Album of the Year, Best Collaboration, Best Use of Instrument, and best Contemporary/Alternative Album of the Year). He also won the 2014 Crystal Awards for Best use of Instrument and 2013 AGMA Awards in the United Kingdom for Best Afro Jazz/Instrumental.
