= Phil Thompson (producer) =

British DJ and record producer

Phil Thompson is a UK producer and DJ on the Bedrock Records roster and has released many singles with them under the alias "Moonface". His tracks have been featured on many Bedrock compilations and Global Underground compilations. He has also done remix work for Bedrock.
