= Micah Stampley =

American Gospel music singer

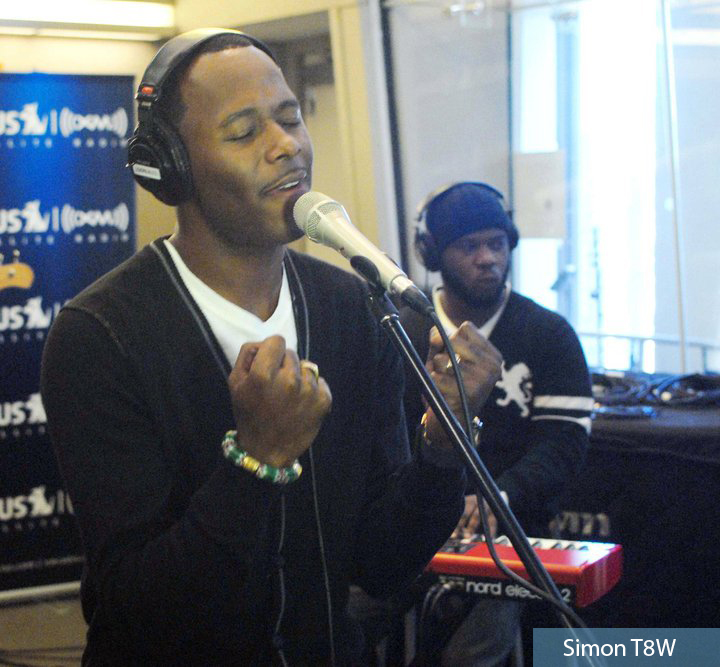

Background information
- Born: Micah Keith Stampley; September 7, 1971 (age 55)
- Genres: CCM, gospel
- Occupations: Singer, songwriter
- Years active: 2005–present
- Labels: EMI, Music World Entertainment, Motown Gospel
- Website: www.micahstampley.org

Micah Keith Stampley (born September 7, 1971) is an American gospel singer-songwriter.

== Early life ==
Stampley was born on September 7, 1971. As a youth, he listened to Andrae Crouch, Michael W. Smith, Shirley Caesar, Michael Jackson, Billy Ocean and Cyndi Lauper.

== Career ==
Stampley sang, between 1994 and 1997, in Rev. Earl Johnson's church in Pasadena, California. Then he went back to Louisiana, at his father's church music department. In 1998 he married Heidi Jones, a fellow gospel singer and nursing student. Heidi has been instrumental in her husband's career, writing several songs for his debut album. In 1999 the couple relocated to New Orleans when Stampley accepted a position as co-choir director and musician for Bishop Paul Morton's Greater St. Stephen's Church. In 2003 Stampley became assistant minister of music at St. Agnes Baptist Church in Houston.

In 2006, Stampley was nominated for two Stellar awards: New Artist of the Year and Male Vocalist of the Year.

In 2014, Stampley sang at the Experience, a Gospel festival Nigeria with an attendance of over 600,000. The same year, he was nominated for two Dove Awards: Contemporary Gosple/Urban Song of the Year ("Our God") and Contemporary/Gospel Urban Album of the Year (Love Never Fails).

On May 20, 2016, To the King: Vertical Worship, a mix of previously released material and new songs. "Be Lifted" was named as one of the top hot new songs in 2016 by BlackGospel.com.

== Voice ==
"Worthy to Be Praised"
Excerpt from "Worthy to Be Praised", illustrating Stampley's upper register.

Stampley has a multi-octave vocal range spanning bass to first soprano. He has had no formal vocal training. He has described his voice as follows: "It's just a sound that God has given me, I think He just kind of fine tuned my vocal chords and gave me this high register. I can sing bass and/or soprano naturally."

His voice has been compared with that of Donnie McClurkin, who is also known in gospel music for his upper register. In a joint appearance, McClurkin told Stampley: "You sing much higher than I do and you have more clarity than I do. And I have always admired your voice."

In 2005, Billboard placed Stampley on its Top 10 Gospel Music Artists list, and AOL Black Voices included him among its Top 11 Gospel Geniuses.

== Personal life ==
Micah and Heidi Stampley are the co-founders of Interface Entertainment and Operation I Believe, non-profit humanitarian organizations. Currently, he serves as the Visionary Leader and Chief Worshipper of Shift Global, Inc.

Stampley is a third-generation licensed preacher.

== Discography ==
- The Songbook of Micah (2005)
- A Fresh Wind ... the Second Sound (2006)
- Ransomed (2008)
- Release Me (2010)
- One Voice (2011)
- Love Never Fails (2013)
- To the King: Vertical Worship (2016)
