= Joe Praize =

Nigerian musical artist (born 1979)

- Born: Joseph Omo Ebhodaghe; June 20, 1979 (age 47); Edo State, Nigeria
- Genres: Gospel, praise and worship, soul
- Occupation: Gospel singer,
- Years active: 2005–present
- Label: Coast2coast
- Website: www.joepraizeministry.com

Joseph Omo Ebhodaghe (born 20 June 1979), popularly known as Joe Praize, is a Nigerian gospel singer, praise and worship leader, songwriter, and music director who rose to popularity following the release of his hit song "Mighty God" off his debut album My Praise.

== Early life and career ==
Born in Edo State Nigeria, into a family of nine, Joe Praize was born again in 1991. He is a graduate of Social Work and Administration from the University of Jos, Plateau State, Nigeria. He then became a praise and worship leader at the Love World a.k.a. Christ Embassy. He has ministered in several countries including South Africa, Canada, United Kingdom, the United States, Australia, Italy, Spain, Switzerland, Cyprus, Nigeria, Ghana Qatar, Philippine, and others, and he has won several awards. Some of the awards include the Song of the Year Award 2010, at the Love World Award with the song, "Mighty God", which is track number five on his first album, My Praise. He was also nominated for Best African Gospel by SABC Crown Gospel Awards 2010, winner Best West Africa at the Africa Gospel Music Awards UK 2011, the Love World Awards 2011, for Worship Song of the Year, best artiste of the year at the crystal award Nigeria, best gospel song at the Coson awards Nigeria, lifetime achievement at the gospel music awards Italy, collaborated with Ayo Vincent in her video "You Are Great", which won the best video at the Crystal Awards for gospel artists in Nigeria, which held on the July 2014, special recognition award loveworld Australia in 2014.

He married his wife Joana in June 2017, and they had their first child, a baby boy, on August 26, 2018.

== Discography ==
=== Singles ===
- Jesus Has Won (2026)
- Thank You Jesus (2025)
- Happy Birthday (2023)
- Powerful Jesus (Live - 2023)
- My God, My Love (ft Ada Ehi - 2022)
- Come & See (ft Mercy Chinwo - 2022)
- Mo Gbono (I'm hot - 2022)
- Jehovah Bless Me (2021)
- Oga Jesus (2021)
- God Alone (2020)
- Done Me Well (2020)
- Powerful Jesus (2019)
- Joy Overflow (2018)
- Holy Ghost (2018)
- You Alone (2017)
- Everything is Blessed (2017)
- The Name of Jesus (2017)
- More Than Enough (2017)
- Powerful God (2016)
- You Are Jesus (2016)
- I Am Blessed (2016)
- Miracle Papa (2016)
- Mighty God (Remix - 2012)
- I Turn to You (2012)

=== Studio albums ===
- ’’ Thank You Jesus ( EP 2025 )
- The Assignment (Premium Version - 2023)
- The Assignment (2022)
- Praise Ovation (Live Recording - 2020)
- The Praise of the Forth Man (2019)
- My Praise (2016)
- Most High (2015)
- All the Praise (2015)

=== Live albums ===
Joe Praize has been part of the various live recordings at the Christ embassy live DVD recording event across the years, Joe Praize also collaborated with Sinach at her live DVD recordings in 2011. He appeared in Worship in the Room, a live streaming recording event which took place on 1 April 2017 with thousands of people watching live via different platforms of social media and YouTube.

=== Compilation albums ===
- BLW Song Compilation Album (2013)
- Soweto Gospel Choir Divine Decade Song Compilation
