= Chevelle Franklyn =

Jamaican gospel reggae and reggae singer

Chevelle Jasintha Franklyn (born 4 March 1974) is a Jamaican gospel reggae singer. She started her career in reggae, but switched to gospel reggae after a conversion experience in 1998.

== Early life and reggae career ==
Born in the Tawes Pen area of Spanish Town in St. Catherine Parish, Franklyn was the fourth in a family of ten children. She was forced to leave school at the age of fourteen to help support her family, and found work singing at hotels and resorts. After a year or two, she came to Kingston and worked with various producers there - Rohan Harrison, who had recorded her first single ("Here I Am") when she was 14, Steely & Clevie ("No One in the World", 1989) and Winston Riley. Manager and producer Mikey Bennett encouraged her to improve her education. Produced by Harrison and Bennett, her first hit song was "Nice and Naughty" (1992). This helped lead to collaborations with major stars like deejay Spragga Benz ("A-1 Lover", 1995), Shabba Ranks ("Mr. Lover Man", 1991), deejay Lady G ("Thank You", 1995) and Beenie Man (the song and album Dancehall Queen, 1997). The latter was also used in the 1997 Jamaican movie Dancehall Queen. Franklyn was frustrated that she was usually replaced by an actress in the accompanying videos, and wanted to raise her profile as an artist. After the release of her album Serious Girl in 1996, Franklyn toured extensively in the Caribbean, the UK, and the US.

== Conversion and gospel reggae career ==
In 1998 Franklyn was about to perform "Dancehall Queen" on stage during a concert and instead performed Kirk Franklin's gospel song "Silver and Gold", announcing that she had become a Christian. After collaborations in 2000 with deejays Papa San ("Touch From You") and Lieutenant Stitchie ("Mr. Lover" - a charting hit in the US), she released her first gospel album, Joy, in 2001, toured internationally, and won (in 2002) 5 Caribbean Gospel Reggae Marlin Awards. Her gospel music was controversial with some for combining dancehall with gospel. Her album His Way was released in 2006; another album, Shake It Off (2008), was the product of a 2007 tour of South Africa and featured South African musicians and ministers. In 2008 she also performed in Lagos, Nigeria at "The Experience", a gospel mega-concert that attracted 400,000 attendees. In 2009 she was featured on one track ("Surely Goodness") on American Christian musician Israel Houghton's album The Power of One; the album won the Grammy award in 2010 for Best Pop/Contemporary Gospel Album. In 2011 Franklyn performed at the Calabar Festival. Since then, she has continued to tour.

Franklyn performed at the inauguration of Jamaican Prime Minister Andrew Holness on March 3, 2016. She released the album Set Time in 2017; the album included tracks with gospel artists Israel Houghton and Donnie McClurkin. The album peaked at #12 on the Billboard Reggae Album chart on September 16, 2017.

In 2018, 2019 and 2021 she was awarded by ABGMA with the Song of the Year Award (2018) and with International Psalmist of the Year Award (2019 and 2021).

In 2024 she released South Wind Vol. 1, an album recorded in South Africa which included songs that mixed English and Zulu. In 2025 she received the Sterling Gospel Music Award for album of the year for South Wind Vol. 1 and also Female Artiste of the Year.

== Personal life ==
Franklyn married gospel promoter Colin Watts in March 2003; the couple had met in the UK in 2001 while Franklyn was touring there.

== Discography ==
=== Charted singles ===
List of charted singles, showing year released, chart positions and album name
Title	Year	Peak chart position	Album
Title	Year	JAM Air.	Album
"Thank You" (with Lady G)	1995	2	God Daughter
