= Agboola Shadare =

Nigerian songwriter

- Born: Agboola Shadare; Kano, Nigeria
- Origin: Ilesha, Nigeria
- Genres: Smooth Jazz, Christian

Agboola Shadare is a Nigerian songwriter, composer and producer. He started as a church musician, then moved into club and studio production in Nigeria. He produced for popular Nigerian artistes such as Gbenga Owoeye-Wise and Mike Aremu, and released two solo albums, Dream Dawn and Glory. Shadare then moved to the US, playing Christian smooth jazz. Agboola's music is now played around the world.

He has performed alongside Bob James, Ron Kenoly, Yolanda Adams and other top artistes and several times on TBN.

Agboola held concerts across Europe, being due to return to the United States in March 2009, where he was to release two albums and a play at a concert at the New Jersey Performing Arts Center in Newark.

== Early life ==
Agboola was born in Kano City in Africa on 9 May Originally from Ilesa, in Southern Nigeria.

At the age of twelve Shadares became a drummer in the church. By age 19 he had learnt more instruments, particularly the guitar, which became his signature instrument, playing with his style.

Between 1993 and 1994, Agboola appeared in several concerts with the group Treasure Band. He later concentrated on a Christian approach; between 1994 and 2002 he played with House on the Rock Musical Ministries, led by Pastor Paul Adefarasin.

Agboola became the first Nigerian artist to produce a contemporary jazz album Dream Dawn.

In 2000, he was nominated for the Nigerian Musical Award, where he won the BEST CONTEMPORARY JAZZ ALBUM OF THE YEAR AWARD. Shortly after, he started his band, called the "Motivation Band."

== Discography ==
Dream Dawn

1. Jesus Loves Me
2. Tire
3. Am So Grateful
4. Abube
5. Be Magnified
6. Praise Him
7. Talojulo
8. Higher Ground
9. Modupe
10. Holy Spirit
11. Dream Dawn
12. Worship Him
13. Ose Baba
14. Holy Ground
