= Wole Oni =

Irewole Samuel Oni
- Also known as: Wole Oni
- Born: Akure, Ondo State
- Genres: Jazz, Gospel music
- Occupations: Songwriter, Jazz artist, & music producer
- Instrument: Piano
- Website: iamwoleoni.com

Irewole Samuel Oni, known predominantly by his stage name, Wole Oni is a Nigerian born songwriter, Jazz artist, and music producer. He is a United Nations International Ambassador for Peace, and has been endorsed by Yamaha Corporation Yamaha Gulf FZE as Yamaha first artist signed in the whole of Africa. He is a member of the Lagos Jazz Society. He is married with kids even though he doesn't like to discuss his marriage in public.

== Life and career ==
Born in Akure, Ondo State, Nigeria, Wole was a graduate of the University of Lagos where he studied Computer Science. He is the writer and producer of singles such as Cover me Lord and a Christmas song titled Come let Is adore Him.

Wole produced notable hit songs like Igwe by the Midnight Crew, Kosobabire by Folake Umosen, Ijoba Orun, Kolebaje, Halleluyah by Lara George, and many others. As a Jazz artist, he has performed at notable Jazz and Rock concerts in UAE, USA, Ireland, South African, the United Kingdom, and other locations.

Wole is the CEO of Instinct Productions and Wole Oni Music Productions (WOMP). He performed at the Commonwealth Heads of Government Summit with Queen Elizabeth in attendance.

Wole has won multiple awards in his career over the years. Among the notable ones include: AGMA UK Award for the best producer in Africa 2013, 2014, 2015, Kora award 2004, National Gospel Awards and others.
