= Pat Uwaje-King =

Patuwaje King
- Also known as: PatUwaje King (Patricia King)
- Born: Patricia Uwaje; 26 March 1979 (age 46); Ibadan, Oyo State, Nigeria
- Genres: African Contemporary Gospel
- Occupations: Singer, Songwriter
- Instrument: Voice (Alto/Tenor)
- Years active: 1994–present
- Labels: GPK Records
- Member of: Midnight Crew
- Website: patuwajeking.com

Pat Uwaje-King (also known as Patricia King) is a Nigerian Gospel music singer and songwriter, best known for her solo album, "He's Done Me Well".

== Early life and career ==
Pat Uwaje-King started her singing career at Christ Winners Church, Lagos, at the age of 13. She is her parents’ first daughter and the fourth of seven children. Her professional career began in 1999 when she did a series of jingles and commercials for African Independent Television, Nigeria. She went to Yaba College of Technology where she was the music director of the school's mass choir – Original Love Choir (OLC). Midnight Crew, the multi-award-winning gospel music quartet was formed out of OLC on 8 November 2001, while Patricia was studying at Yaba College.

Pat Uwaje-King is a Creative Arts graduate of the University of Lagos, Nigeria. She is a music consultant and leader of Midnight Crew, a gospel music group, popularly known for their hit track, "Igwe"

== Education ==
Pat Uwaje-King had her Primary and began her secondary education in Ibadan, Oyo state where she was born, although, she later moved to Lagos, where she completed her Secondary education before proceeding to University. She graduated from the University of Lagos in 2010 with a Bachelor of Arts degree, majoring in Theatre Arts. She also possesses a diploma in Secretariat Administration from Yaba College of Technology, which she obtained in 2001.

== Solo career ==
In November 2013, Midnight Crew announced the next phase of their movement, permitting individual group members to embark on solo projects while leveraging on the platform already created by the Midnight Crew Music & Ministries. This led to Pat Uwaje-King and other members of the group embarking on various projects including solo album & single releases, mentorship and tutorial programs for choirs and potential music ministers, and more. Uwaje-King has since released 6 singles, which includes "Thank You Lord", "Amara", "Jehovah Daalu", "Eze", "He’s Done Me Well" and "All Power". She also released videos for "Eze" and He’s Done Me Well. Shortly after the release of the third single, "All Power", Pat Uwaje-King announced the release of her debut solo album which was subsequently released on 3 June 2015. On the 13th of June 2020, her Sophomore album with 12 beautiful tracks, amongst which is the widely accepted "All Power Praise Medley" was released.

== Discography ==
=== Solo albums ===
- 2020 - Amazing Grace
- 2015 - He's Done Me Well

=== Singles & EPs ===
- 2023 - Your Name is Yahweh (Live)
- 2023 - Daalu
- 2023 - God of Wonders
- 2017 - Amara
- 2016 - Thank You Lord
- 2016 - He's Done Me Well

=== Midnight Crew albums ===
- 2013 - Eze
- 2012 - King of Nations
- 2008 - Igwe
- 2006 - Tungba Unlimited
- 2004 - Fusion
