= Tim Godfrey (musician) =

Nigerian gospel singer (born 1980)

- Also known as: Fearless
- Born: Timothy Chukwudi Godfrey; 26 August 1980 (age 45)
- Genres: Christian hip hop; urban contemporary gospel; CCM; contemporary worship music; gospel
- Occupations: Singer-songwriter; worship leader; musician; producer; sound engineer
- Years active: 2003–present
- Label: Rox Nation
- Website: timgodfreyworldwide.com

Timothy Chukwudi Godfrey (born 26 August 1980) is a Nigerian gospel singer. He is best known for his song "Nara" in collaboration with Travis Greene. He is the founder and owner of the record label Rox Nation and also the Founder of Xtreme Crew.

== Career ==
=== Early life and career beginnings ===
Timothy Chukwudi Godfrey was born on 26 August 1980 to Victor Godfrey in Kaduna, Nigeria. He is the second born of his parents, and one of six children.

He had his primary education in Kaduna Nigeria, although he hails from Anambra State. He received an honorary doctorate in Fine Art and Musicology at the Trinity International University of Ambassadors, Georgia, USA in 2018.

=== Career highlights ===
Godfrey is the convener of the annual Fearless Gospel Concert, which has hosted international gospel artists including Marvin Sapp, Kirk Franklin, Travis Greene, Israel Houghton, JJ Hairston, and Sammie Okposo.

In 2018, Godfrey featured Travis Greene in the breakout hit song "Nara", which has received over 170 million views on YouTube.

In 2019, he featured Israel Houghton on the single "Toya", and collaborated with JJ Hairston on the single "Onaga" from the latter's album.

Since 2016, Godfrey has been a regular feature at the Experience concert.

== Personal life ==
On 23 April 2022, Godfrey married Erica, whom he had proposed to on Valentine's Day.

== Songs ==
Tim Godfrey's songs from 2014 to 2017
S/N	Song name	Year
1	Na You be God	2014
2	Amen	2014
3	Alright	2014
4	Oriki	2014
5	I Worship	2014
6	The Audience of One	2014
7	Mighty God	2014
8	Omemma	2014
9	Kosi	2014
10	Ahaa	2016
11	So Good	2017
12	Ekelebe	2017
13	Idinma	2017
14	Chizobam	2017
15	Lai Lai	2017
16	Onyedikagi	2017
17	Worship Medley	2017
18	Good Day	2017
19	Hero	2017
20	Agidigba	2017
21	Bless The Lord	2017
22	Walking Miracles	2017
23	War Cry	2017
24	Jigidem	2017
25	Bigger	2017

Tim Godfrey's songs from 2017 to 2019
S/N	Song name	Year
1	Akpoaza	2017
2	Naija War Medley	2017
3	Imela	2017
4	Nobody Reprise	2017
5	Alright	2017
6	Omewoya	2017
7	On My Way	2017
8	Folo Folo	2017
9	Halleluyah	2018
10	Igbo Medley	2018
11	Jo Ti E	2018
12	Akah	2018
13	Nara	2018
14	Gbemisoke	2018
15	Trumpet	2018
16	Toya	2019
17	Carry Me	2019
18	Onaga (It's Working)	2019
19	Nara (Testimony)	2019
20	Victory	2019
21	Iyo	2019
22	Okaka	2019

== Awards and nominations ==
- BEFFTA Awards – 2011
- Best Artiste of the year nominee at the Future Awards – 2012
- NEA Award U.S.A. for the Best Gospel Artist/Group of the year – 2012
- Nine nominations at the Crystal Award – 2015
- Eight nominations at the Africa Gospel Awards (AGAFEST) – 2018
- Male Artists of Excellence at Africa Gospel and Media Awards (AGAMA) – 2019
- Tim Godfrey and The Xtreme Crew bagged the Musical Group of Excellence award at the Africa Gospel and Media Awards (AGAMA) – 2019
- Male African Artiste of the Year at the GTMA Awards – 2019
- Songs of Excellence award at the Africa Gospel and Media Awards (AGAMA) – 2019
- Male artiste of the year at Africa Gospel Awards (AGAFEST) – 2019
- Best International Artist nominee at the Premier Gospel Awards – 2019

== See also ==
- List of Nigerian gospel musicians
