= Mercy Chinwo =

Nigerian gospel musician (born 1991)

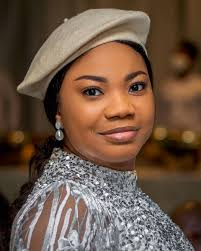

Background information
- Born: Mercy Nnenda Chinwo; 5 September 1990 (age 36)
- Genres: Gospel; Igbo Christian music; contemporary gospel; worship
- Occupations: Singer; songwriter; actress
- Instrument: Vocals
- Years active: 2017–present
- Labels: GNT Nation; EeZee Conceptz (former)
- Member of: Lighthill Music
- Spouse: Blessed Uzochikwa (m. 2022)

Mercy Nnenda Chinwo (born 5 September 1990), known professionally as Mercy Chinwo or Mercy Chinwo-Blessed, is a Nigerian gospel singer, songwriter, and actress. She gained recognition after winning the second season of Nigerian Idol. In 2017, she signed a recording contract with EeZee Conceptz. Chinwo has released the albums The Cross: My Gaze (2018), Satisfied (2020), Overwhelming Victory (2024), and In His Will (2025).

== Life and career ==
Mercy Nnenda Chinwo was born on 5 September 1990, in Rivers State, Nigeria. She started singing in the children's choir at her church when she was six years old. Chinwo earned a certificate while attending the Goodwill International School, and pursued her secondary education at Paradise International School. She is an alumna of the International Business Management Institute (IBMI), where she earned a degree in human resource management.

Chinwo gained recognition after winning the second season of Nigerian Idol, and decided to pursue a career in gospel music after winning the competition. In 2017, she signed a record deal with EeZee Conceptz and released several successful songs and albums. Chinwo is considered a prominent figure in Nigerian gospel music, and is a minister. In 2015, she released the singles "Testimony" and "Igwe". Two years later, she signed a recording contract with EeZee Conceptz, a record label founded by Eezee Tee. Chinwo's single "Excess Love" was released in 2018. Since establishing herself as a gospel act, she has been featured on a number of projects and has worked with artists such as JJ Hairson, Nathaniel Bassey, Chioma Jesus, Banky W, Joe Praize, Samsong, Moses Bliss, Oluwadunsin Oyekan, Judikay, and Preye Odede.

In 2023, she and her husband established the MercyisBlessed Foundation, an NGO focused on helping underprivileged communities and youth development.

== Personal life ==
Chinwo married pastor Blessed Uzochikwa on 13 August 2022, in Port Harcourt. They currently reside in Lagos, Nigeria, and gave birth to their first child in 2023.

== Achievements ==
- In 2012, Chinwo won the Nigerian Idol competition
- In 2018, she was awarded the Best Gospel Artiste plaque at the Climax Awards.
- In 2019, at the first Africa Gospel Awards Festival, Chinwo won three awards: Africa Gospel New Artiste of the Year, Africa Gospel Female Artiste of the Year, and Africa Gospel Song of the Year for "Excess Love". Moreover, she won the ABGMA International Psamlist of the Year award.
- In 2020, Chinwo won Gospel Artiste of the Year at the AFRIMMA Awards.
- In 2022, she won Africa Gospel Music of the Year at CLIMA Africa Awards, and Afrobeat of the Year at the Antigua Barbuda Global Music & Media Awards.
- In 2023, Chinwo won Female Gospel Music Artiste of the Year at the Golden Star Awards.
- In 2025, she won Best Inspirational Single for "You Do This One" at The Headies.

== Discography ==
Studio albums

- The Cross: My Gaze (2018)
- Satisfied (2020)
- Overwhelming Victory (2024)
- In His Will (2025)

EPs

- Elevated (2023)

=== Singles ===
Year	Title	Ref
2014	"Testimony"	
2016	"Igwe"	
2018	"Excess Love"	
2018	"Omekanaya"	
2018	"Chinedum"	
2018	"No More Pain"	
2019	"Power Belongs to Jesus"	
2019	"Akamdinelu"	
2019	"Oh Jesus"	
2020	"Obinasom"	
2020	"Kosi"	
2020	"Tasted Of Your Power"	
2020	"Na You Dey Reign"	
2021	"Yahweh"	
2023	"Wonder"	
2023	"You Do This One"	
2024	"Give Me Chance"	
2024	"We Move"	
2025	"When You Say a Thing"	

== Filmography ==
- House of Gold (2013)

== See also ==
- List of Nigerian gospel musicians
- List of Nigerian musicians
