= Travis Greene =

American gospel musician and pastor (born 1984)

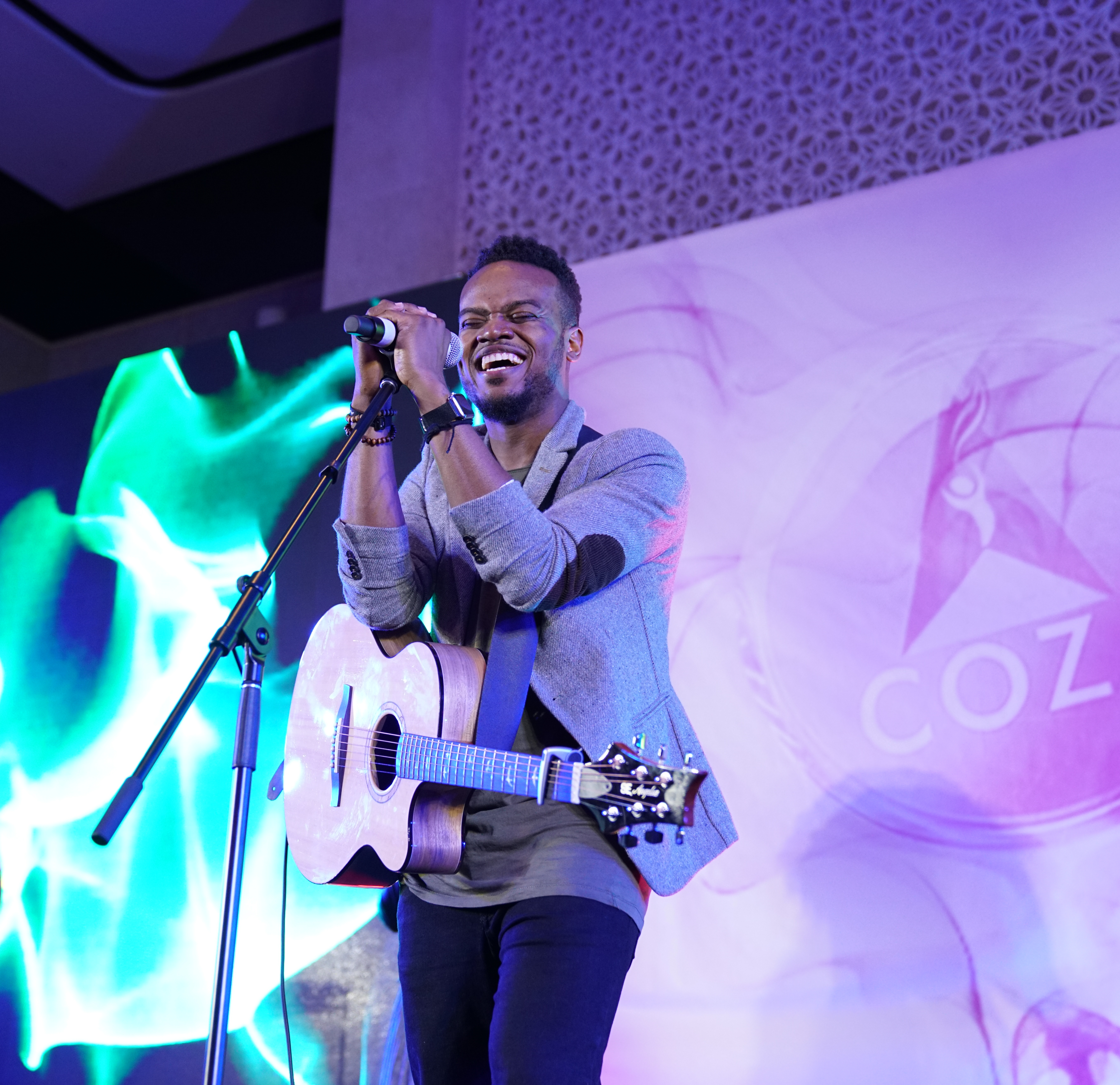

Background information
- Born: Travis Montorius Greene; January 17, 1984 (age 42); Delaware
- Origin: Warner Robins, Georgia; Charlotte, North Carolina; Columbia, South Carolina
- Genres: Gospel; urban contemporary gospel
- Occupations: Singer; songwriter; pastor
- Instruments: Vocals; guitar
- Years active: 2007–present
- Labels: RCA Inspiration; Pendulum
- Spouse: Dr. Jackie Greene | nee' Gyamfi | (December 2011 - Present)
- Website: travisgreene.tv

Travis Montorius Greene (born January 17, 1984) is an American gospel musician and the founding senior pastor of The Forward City Church.

== Music career ==
Greene began his music career in 2007 with the release of The More via Greenelight Records. He has since released two studio albums, Stretching Out in 2010, The Hill in 2015, and an extended play, Intentional in 2015. Travis Greene's third album Crossover: Live From Music City was released in 2017 as a live album. Greene's music has charted on the Billboard Top Gospel Albums and the Top Gospel Songs charts and he has been nominated for multiple awards, including five Grammy Awards and 13 Stellar Awards.

Greene and his wife Jackie founded and oversee The Forward City Church in Columbia, South Carolina.

== Early life ==
Travis Montorius Greene was born on January 17, 1984, in Delaware, to mother, Charleather Greene and was raised in Warner Robins, Georgia. Greene's father died of an aneurysm in 1989. Greene was originally a still-born, but was resuscitated. A few years later, at the age of four he was resuscitated after a four-storied building fall, while he was in Germany.

== Career ==
Greene's music recording started in 2007, with the release, The More, that came out on December 4, 2007, from Greenelight Records. The subsequent release, Stretching Out, a studio album, was released on June 8, 2010, by Pendulum Records.

The release of Stretching Out was Greene's introduction to the Billboard Top Gospel Albums chart, where it placed at No. 27. Songs, "Still Here" and "Prove My Love", both charted on the Billboard Top Gospel Songs chart, at peaks of Nos. 17 and 29, respectively.

Greene released an extended play, Intentional, on August 21, 2015, with RCA Inspiration, where this placed at No. 3 on the Billboard Top Gospel Albums chart. His song, "Intentional", peaked at No. 1 on the Billboard Top Gospel Songs chart .

Greene's second studio album, The Hill, was released on October 30, 2015, from RCA Inspiration and charted at No. 1 on the Billboard Gospel charts.

Greene's rise in the gospel genre has been reported in Billboard Magazine, Rolling Out Magazine, Jet magazine, with performances at the Essence Music Festival, Trumpet Awards and BMI Trailblazers. In 2016, JET Magazine called Greene "The Future of Gospel".

In 2017, Greene received criticism for his decision to perform at President Donald Trump's inaugural ball.

On February 2, 2017, Greene recorded his third album Crossover: Live From Music City in Nashville, Tennessee.

On March 24, 2017, Greene led the field of nominees at the 2017 Stellar Gospel Music Awards by taking home seven awards. At the awards, Greene performed a medley of "Made a Way" alongside Gospel recording artists Israel Houghton, Jonathan McReynolds and Jonathan Butler.

== Personal life ==
Greene met Jackie Gyamfi (born 15 December 1987) during a ministry event in 2007, and the two went on to marry on her birthday in December 2011. They have three sons: Jace (b. May 2014), Josh (b. September 2016) and Judah (b. April 2019), and together they currently oversee and are the senior pastors of The Forward City Church in Columbia, South Carolina.

== Discography ==
=== Studio albums ===
List of studio albums, with selected chart positions
Title	Album details	Peak chart positions	
Title	Album details	US Gos	US
Stretching Out	Released: June 8, 2010; Label: Pendulum; Formats: CD, digital download	27	—
The Hill	Released: October 30, 2015; Label: RCA Inspiration; Formats: CD, digital download	1	92
Broken Record	Released: November 1, 2019; Label: Provident; Formats: CD, digital download	—	125

=== Live albums ===
List of live albums, with selected chart positions
Title	Album details	Peak chart positions	
Title	Album details	US Gos	US
Crossover: Live from Music City	Released: August 18, 2017; Label: Provident; Formats: CD, digital download	1	61
Setlist Vol.1 (Live)	Released August 8, 2019; Formats: CD, digital download	—	—

=== Extended plays ===
List of EPs, with selected chart positions
Title	EP details	Peak chart positions
Title	EP details	US Gos
Intentional	Released: August 21, 2015; Four-track preview of The Hill; Label: Pendulum; Formats: CD, digital download	3

=== Singles ===
Year	Single	Chart Positions
Year	Single	US Gospel
2010	"Still Here"	17
2011	"Prove My Love"	29
2013	"The Anthem"	—
2015	"Intentional"	1
2016	"Made a Way"	1
2017	"You Waited"	1
2019	"Won't Let Go"	1
2019	"Good & Loved" (with Doe Jones)	1

== Awards and nominations ==
=== Grammy Awards ===
Year	Nominee/Work	Category	Result	Ref
2016	"Intentional"	Best Gospel Performance/Song	Nominated	
2017	"Made a Way [Live]"	Best Gospel Performance/Song	Nominated	
2018	Crossover: Live from Music City	Best Gospel Album	Nominated	
2020	"See the Light"	Best Gospel Performance/Song	Nominated	
2021	"Won't Let Go"	Best Gospel Performance/Song	Nominated	

=== Billboard Music Awards ===
Year	Nominee/Work	Category	Result	Ref
2017	Travis Greene	Top Gospel Artist	Nominated	
2017	The Hill	Top Gospel Album	Nominated	
2017	"Made a Way"	Top Gospel Song	Won	
2016	Travis Greene	Top Gospel Artist	Won	

=== Stellar Awards ===
In 2017, Greene received seven Stellar Awards. In 2018, he received four Stellar Awards.

Year	Nominee/work	Category	Result
2017	Made a Way	Song of the Year	Won
2017	Travis Greene	Male Vocalist of the Year	Won
2017	The Hill	CD of the Year	Won
2017	Travis Greene	Contemporary Male Vocalist of the Year	Won
2017	The Hill	Contemporary CD of the Year	Won
2017	The Hill	Recorded Music Packaging of the Year	Won
2017	The Hill	Praise & Worship CD of the Year	Won
2018
2018	Travis Greene	Artist of the Year	Won
2018	Crossover Live from Music City	Producer of the Year	Won
2018	Travis Greene	Male Vocalist of the Year	Won
2018	Travis Greene	Contemporary Male of the Year	Won
