= Nathaniel Bassey =

Nigerian gospel musician (born 1981)

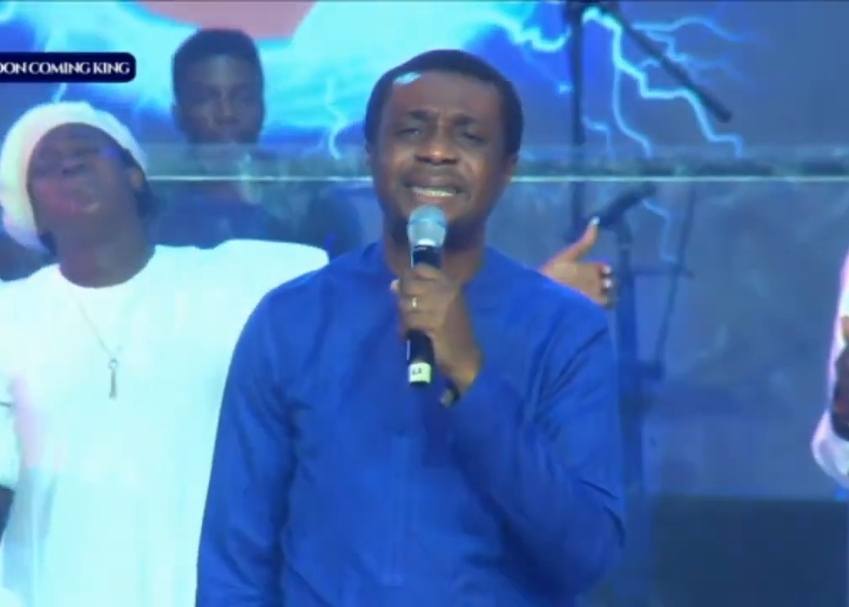
- Born: 27 August 1981 (age 45); Lagos, Nigeria
- Occupation: Gospel musician
- Notable work: #HallelujahChallenge

Nathaniel Ndianaabasi Bassey (born 27 August 1981) is a Nigerian singer, pastor, trumpeter and gospel songwriter popularly known for his songs "Imela", "Onise Iyanu", and "Olowogbogboro." Over the years, Bassey has established himself as one of the prominent and most listened-to gospel ministers in Nigeria. His music spans across different genres such as jazz, worship, hymns and medley. He attends The Redeemed Christian Church Of God and pastors The Oasis Lagos, the youth church of the RCCG Kings Court in Victoria Island, Lagos.

== Early life and education ==
Bassey was born in Lagos, Nigeria, on 27 August 1981. He is originally from Ikot Ofon Ikono, Uyo local government area in Akwa-Ibom state, south-south Nigeria. Mr. E. Joshua Bassey, his father, was a minister in The Apostolic Church, Bashua Assembly, Somolu. He attended Igbobi College, Yaba and Eletu Edibo Grammar School. He studied International Relations and Politics at the University of Lagos before moving to London to study politics thereafter. Conversely, he studied music at the Middlesex University Summer School.

Nathaniel Bassey is married to Sarah Bassey. They got married in the year 2013, although they had known each other for 12 years before their marriage.

== Music career ==
Nathaniel started his musical career in the church, where he then joined the Rhodes Orchestra and played the trumpet for two years. He was a trumpeter who composed a song at the visit to Stella Obasanjo, the late wife of former President Olusegun Obasanjo. in 2004, he featured in the album "New Jazz Stew Project: Revelation" alongside top jazz performers like Wole Oni and Yinka Davies. In 2018, Bassey was one of the leading artistes in the Nigerian Christian gathering – The Experience. His debut album, Elohim, was recorded and mixed in Cape Town, South Africa, in the year 2008. It has been described as a spiritual and artistic masterpiece with the hit track, "Someone's knocking at the door," a soft-rock tune currently generating so much interest locally and internationally.

=== #HallelujahChallenge ===
Nathaniel started the #HallelujahChallenge In June 2017, where he and other believers worship God for an hour, from 12:00 am to 1:00 am. He streams this event on his Instagram, Facebook and YouTube pages and invites others to join him. In less than a month, the event had over 600,000 views. The #HallelujahChallenge for 2020 was held from 4 to 24 February 2020 In 2021, the challenge was held from 1 to 21 February. #HallelujahChallenge2025 was held from February 10 to March 1, 2025.

=== Performances ===
- Performance at The Liberty Church in London
- The Experience '15 global

== Discography ==
=== Studio albums ===
- Someone's at the Door (2010)
- The Son of God (& Imela) (2014)
- This God is too Good (2016)
- Revival Flames (2017)
- Jesus: The Resurrection & the Life (2018)
- The King is Coming (2019)
- Hallelujah Again (Revelation 19:3) (2021)
- Names of God (2022)
- Hallelujah Live (2023)
- Jesus Iye (2023)
- Yahweh Sabaoth (2023)
- Iba (2023)
- Bless the Lord (2024)
- The River (2024)
- The Glory of His Presence (2026)
- The Life Recording (2026)
