= List of Yoruba people =

This is a list of notable Yoruba people.

== Film and cinema ==
=== Nollywood ===
==== Actors and actresses ====
- Adebayo Salami (b. 1953), Nigerian actor, filmmaker, movie producer and director
- Aderounmu Adejumoke
- Adunni Ade
- Afeez Oyetoro
- Aisha Lawal
- Akin Ogungbe
- Antar Laniyan
- Aremu Afolayan
- Ayo Adesanya
- Ayo Makun
- Babatunde Omidina
- Bimbo Ademoye
- Bolaji Amusan
- Bukky Ajayi
- Bukky Wright
- Dele Odule
- Desmond Elliot
- Dorcas Shola Fapson
- Eniola Ajao
- Eniola Badmus
- Faithia Balogun
- Femi Adebayo
- Funke Akindele
- Funsho Adeolu
- Gabriel Afolayan
- Gbenro Ajibade, Nigerian actor, producer, model and presenter
- Gloria Bamiloye, dramatist, film actress, producer and director, co-founder of Mount Zion Drama Ministry
- Hakeem Kae-Kazim
- Iyabo Ojo (b. 1977), film actress, director and producer
- Jide Kosoko (b. 1954)
- Joke Silva (b. 1961), actress, director and businesswoman
- Kareem Adepoju
- Kunle Remi
- Lateef Adedimeji (b. 1986), actor, film-maker, producer and director
- Mike Bamiloye (b. 1960), actor, dramatist, producer and director
- Mosun Filani, film and voice actress
- Moji Afolayan (b. 1968), actress, film-maker, producer and director
- Moji Olaiya (1975-2017), Nigerian actress
- Muyiwa Ademola
- Mr Macaroni
- Nike Peller
- Odunlade Adekola
- Oga Bello (b. 1953)
- Olaniyi Afonja
- Olu Jacobs
- Omotola Jalade Ekeinde
- Ramsey Nouah
- Saheed Balogun
- Sola Sobowale
- Shaffy Bello
- Taiwo Hassan
- Toyin Abraham
- Toyin Afolayan (b. 1959), popularly known as Lola Idije, actress
- Toyin Raji (b. 1972), beauty pageant titleholder
- Wole Ojo
- Yewande Adekoya (b. 1984), actress, film-maker, director and producer
- Yinka Quadri (b. 1959), actor, film-maker, producer and director

==== Writers and directors ====
- Biyi Bandele (1967–2022), novelist, playwright and filmmaker
- Kemi Adesoye, Peter ijagbemi screenwriter
- Kemi Adetiba (b. 1980), filmmaker, television director, music video director
- Kunle Afolayan (b. 1974), actor peter ijagbemi, film producer and director
- Meji Alabi
- Oyin Adejobi (1926–2000), dramatist and actor
- Tomi Adeyemi (b. 1993), Nigerian-American novelist and creative writing coach
- Tunde Kelani (b. 1948), filmmaker, storyteller, photographer, director and producer

=== Non-Nollywood ===
- Adelayo Adedayo
- Adepero Oduye
- Adewale Akinnuoye-Agbaje
- Alex Lanipekun
- Andi Osho
- Ariyon Bakare
- Bolaji Badejo
- Damson Idris
- David Oyelowo
- Dayo Okeniyi
- Femi Emiola
- Gbemisola Ikumelo
- Gbenga Akinnagbe
- Gina Yashere
- Hakeem Kae-Kazim
- Isaach de Bankolé
- John Boyega
- Kola Bokinni
- KSI
- O-T Fagbenle
- Richard Ayoade
- Rick Famuyiwa
- Rotimi
- Sope Aluko
- Stephen K. Amos
- Toks Olagundoye
- Tosin Cole
- Wunmi Mosaku

== Academics ==
- Akinwumi Ogundiran (b. 1966), archaeologist, historian, anthropologist, author of The Yoruba: A New History
- Bolaji Akinyemi (b. 1942), Nigerian professor of political science who was Nigeria External Affairs Minister in 1985-1987
- Bolanle Awe (b. 1933), Nigerian history professor
- Christopher Kolade (b. 1932), Nigerian diplomat and academic
- David Olusoga (b. 1970), British-Nigerian historian, writer, broadcaster, author of Black And British: A Forgotten History
- Hezekiah Ademola Oluwafemi (1919-1983), Vice-Chancellor of Obafemi Awolowo University from 1966 to 1975
- Isaac Folorunso Adewole (b. 1954), Nigerian professor of gynaecology and obstetrics
- Kofoworola Ademola (1913-2002), educationist, first black African woman to earn a degree from Oxford University
- Kola Tubosun (b. 1981), linguist, writer, teacher, known for Yoruba Name Project, Nigerian English Google Assistant
- Lola Akande (b. 1965), academic, author, public relations professional.
- Olanrewaju Fagbohun (b. 1966), academic, author, investor, professor of environmental law and a Senior Advocate of Nigeria
- Orishatukeh Faduma
- Oyeronke Oyewumi, sociologist, gender scholar
- Oyewusi Ibidapo-Obe (1949-2021), Nigerian professor of systems engineering, Vice-Chancellor of University of Lagos
- Solomon Babalola
- Stephen Adebanji Akintoye (b. 1935), academic, historian and writer
- T.G.O. Gbadamosi (b. 1939), historian, academic and religious leader
- Toyin Falola (b. 1953), historian and professor of African studies
- Folahanmi Aina (b. 1984), Nigerian political scientist, international security analyst and researcher

== Medicine ==
- Ameyo Stella Adadevoh (1956–2014), physician
- Babatunde Kwaku Adadevoh (1933–1997), physician, educational administrator, professor of chemical pathology
- Elizabeth Abimbola Awoliyi (1910–1971), first woman to practise as a physician in Nigeria
- Joseph Ladapo (b. 1978), Nigerian-American doctor serving as the surgeon general of Florida since 2021
- Latunde Odeku (1927–1974), neurosurgeon
- Olikoye Ransome-Kuti (1927–2003), paediatrician, activist and health minister of Nigeria
- Oni Akerele (d. 1983), Nigeria's first indigenous surgeon
- Orisadipe Obasa (1863–1940), doctor and prince

== Journalism and the media ==
- Ade Adepitan (b. 1973), Nigerian-born British television presenter and wheelchair basketball player
- Adeola Fayehun (b. 1984), journalist
- Abraham Adesanya (1922–2008), Nigerian politician, lawyer, activist, welfarist and liberal progressive
- Dele Momodu (b. 1960), journalist/publisher, businessman and motivational speaker
- Dotun Adebayo (b. 1960), British radio presenter, writer and publisher
- Femi Adesina, journalist
- Femi Oke (b. 1966), British television presenter and journalist
- Henry Dele Alake
- Julie Adenuga (b. 1988), British broadcaster, radio host and the creator of 'Don't Trust The Internet'
- Kayode Soyinka
- Kehinde Bankole (b. 1985), actress, model and television host
- Kitoye Ajasa (1866–1937), Nigerian lawyer and legislator during the colonial period, first Nigerian to be knighted
- Laolu Akande
- Mosunmola Abudu (b. 1964), Nigerian media mogul and philanthropist
- Oluremi Oyo (1952-2014), Nigerian veteran journalist
- Omoyele Sowore (b. 1971), Nigerian human rights activist, founder of an online news agency Sahara Reporters
- Reuben Abati (b. 1965), journalist, politician, television anchor and newspaper columnist
- Seun Osewa (b. 1982), Nigerian internet entrepreneur
- Tolu Ogunlesi (b. 1982), Nigerian journalist, poet, photographer, fiction writer and blogger
- Yinka Bokinni (b. 1989), British radio and television presenter

== Visual arts ==
=== Artists ===
- Ibiyinka Alao (b. 1975), Nigerian American artist, architect, writer, film director and musical theater composer
- Ruth Ige (b. 1992), Nigerian painter based in New Zealand
- Laolu Senbanjo (b. 1982), Nigerian visual artist, musician, singer/songwriter and former human rights attorney
- Aina Onabolu (1882–1963), pioneering Nigerian modern arts teacher and painter
- Kehinde Wiley
- Nike Davies-Okundaye (b. 1951), Nigerian batik and adire textile designer
- Olowe of Ise (c. 1873 – c. 1938), wood sculptor
- Yusuf Grillo (1934-2021), Nigerian painter

=== Photography ===
- Bayo Omoboriowo (b. 1987), Nigerian photojournalist and documentary photographer
- Lola Akinmade Åkerström. photographer and travel writer
- Rotimi Fani-Kayode (1955–1989), Nigerian-born photographer
- TY Bello

== Politics and administration ==
=== Politics ===
- Adebayo Salami (1951–2021), Senator, chieftain of All Progressives Congress
- Adekunle Fajuyi (1926–1966), first military governor of Western Region, Nigeria
- Ademola Adeleke
- Adeyemo Alakija (1884–1952), lawyer, politician, businessman, president of Egbe Omo Oduduwa
- Akinwunmi Ambode (b. 1963), Governor of Lagos State, Nigeria from 2015 to 2019
- Ayodele Fayose (b. 1960), Governor of Ekiti State
- Babajide Sanwo-Olu (b. 1965), Governor of Lagos State from 2019
- Babalola Borisade (1946–2017), Federal Minister of Nigeria
- Babatunde Fashola (b. 1963), lawyer and politician, former Governor of Lagos State
- Benjamin Adekunle (1936–2014), Nigerian Army Brigadier
- Bola Ige (1930–2001), lawyer and politician
- Bola Tinubu (b. 1952), President of Nigeria and national leader of All Progressives Congress
- Bukola Saraki (b. 1962), 13th President of the Senate of Nigeria
- Christopher Omoworare Babajide (b. 1968), Nigerian politician
- Desmond Elliot (b. 1974), Nigerian actor, director and politician
- Dolapo Osinbajo
- Dipo Dina (1960–2010), politician, philanthropist, administrator
- Ernest Shonekan (1936-2022), Nigerian lawyer and statesman
- Femi Fani-Kayode (b. 1960), Nigerian politician, essayist, poet and lawyer
- Femi Gbaja Biamila (b. 1962), Nigerian lawyer
- Femi Hamzat (b. 1964), Nigerian politician
- Folorunsho Coker (b 1965) Nigerian politician
- Francis Adenigba Fadahunsi (b. 1952), Nigerian senator and retired custom officer
- Frederick Fasehun (1935–2018), Nigerian medical doctor, hotel owner and politician
- Funsho Williams (1948–2006), politician from Lagos State
- Gbenga Daniel (b. 1956), Nigerian politician, Governor of Ogun State from 2003 to 2011
- Gboyega Oyetola (b. 1954), 9th Governor of Osun State
- Herbert Macaulay (1864–1946), Nigerian nationalist, politician, surveyor, engineer, architect, journalist and musician
- Ibikunle Amosun (b. 1958), Nigerian politician, Governor of Ogun State from 2011 to 2019
- Joseph Fadahunsi
- Kayode Fayemi (b. 1935), Nigerian politician, Governor of Ekiti State
- Kofo Abayomi (1896–1979), Nigerian ophthalmologist and politician
- Lawan Gwadabe (b. 1949), Military Administrator of Niger State from 1987 to 1992
- Lola Young
- M.K.O. Abiola
- Mudashiru Obasa
- Nicolas Grunitzky
- Oladipo Diya
- Obafemi Awolowo
- Olu Falae
- Oluremi Tinubu
- Olusegun Aganga
- Olusegun Mimiko
- Olusegun Obasanjo
- Olusegun Oni
- Yemi Osinbajo
- Oyinkansola Abayomi
- Rauf Aregbesola
- Rotimi Akeredolu
- Samuel Akintola
- Seyi Makinde
- Thomas Boni Yayi
- Alhaji Abdul Azeez Kolawole Adeyemo
- Tunde Idiagbon
- Bode Thomas
- Rotimi Akeredolu
- Olusegun Mimiko
- Victor Adebowale (b. 1962), People's peer, current chair of the NHS Confederation
- Yemi Osinbajo (b. 1957), Nigerian lawyer and politician, Vice-President of Nigeria since 2015
- Robert Adeyinka Adebayo, officer of the Nigerian Army, Governor of Western Region

=== Administration ===
- Akinwumi Adesina (b. 1960), President of African Development Bank since 2015
- Joseph Oladele Sanusi (b. 1938), Governor of the Central Bank of Nigeria from 1999 to 2004
- Olumuyiwa Benard Aliu (b. 1960), fifth President of the Council of the International Civil Aviation Organization
- Oye Owolewa (b. 1989), Nigerian-American pharmacist and politician
- Kemi Badenoch (b. 1980), Leader of the Opposition and Leader of the Conservative Party, United Kingdom of Great Britain and Northern Ireland
- Wally Adeyemo (b. 1981), Deputy Treasury Secretary, United States of America

== African diaspora ==
=== Brazil ===
- Cândido da Fonseca Galvão (1845-1890), military officer and nobleman
- Osifekunde
- Pacifico Licutan

=== Canada ===
- Thomas Peters

=== Cuba ===
- Carlota (d. in battle in 1844), one of the leaders of the slave rebellion in the Triunvirato plantation
- José Antonio Aponte (c. 1760 - 1812), leader of the Aponte conspiracy
- Miguel "Angá" Díaz (1961 - 2006), musician
- María Magdalena Campos Pons, artist based in the United States
- Manuel Mendive, artist

=== Suriname ===
- Johannes Alabi

=== Trinidad and Tobago ===
- Victor Pascall (1886–1930), cricketer

=== United States ===
- Oluwale Kossola (Cudjoe Lewis)
- Matilda McCrear
- Redoshi (Sally Smith)
- Scipio Vaughan (1784-1840), artisan and slave, inspired Back-to-Africa movement

== Aristocrats ==
=== Monarchs ===
- Abdul-Lateef Adeniran Akanni Ojikutujoye I (b. 1958), Olofin Adimula of Ado-Odo
- Adebiyi Adegboye Adesida Afunbiowo II (1950–2013), traditional ruler of the Akure Kingdom
- Adedotun Aremu Gbadebo III (b. 1943), Alake of Egbaland
- Adeniji Adele (1893–1964), Oba of Lagos
- Adesoji Aderemi (1889–1980), Ooni of Ife
- Adeyeye Enitan Ogunwusi (b. 1974), Ooni of Ile-Ife
- Adeyinka Oyekan (1911–2003), second Christian Oba of Lagos
- Ajaka, Oyo Emperor
- Ajimudaoro Aladesanmi I (r. 1886–1910), Ewi of Ado Ekiti
- Daniel Aladesanmi II (1902–1983), Ewi of Ado Ekiti
- Folagbade Olateru Olagbegi III (1941–2019)
- Fredrick Kumokun Adedeji Haastrup (1820–1901), Oba Obokun of Ilesa, first Christian Oba of Yorubaland
- Ladapo Ademola (1872–1962), Alake of Abeokuta
- Lamidi Adeyemi (b. 1938–2022), Alaafin of Oyo
- Moremi Ajasoro (12th century), legendary queen and folk heroine of the Yoruba people
- Oba, Orisha of the river Oba
- Oduduwa, divine king, according to tradition, first Ooni of Ife (r. c. 1100 AD), ancestor of many dynasties
- Olagbegi Atanneye I (r. 1913–1938), paramaunt ruler of Owo Kingdom
- Olagbegi Atanneye II
- Olateru Olagbegi I (r. 1913–1938)
- Olateru Olagbegi II (1910–1998)
- Olubuse II (1930–2015), traditional ruler of Ife
- Oranyan, legendary founder of Oyo
- Orompoto (16th century), female Alaafin of Oyo
- Oshun
- Osupa
- Oya
- Oyekan I
- Rilwan Akiolu
- Rufus Aladesanmi III
- Samuel Akinsanya
- Shango
- Sikiru Kayode Adetona (b. 1934), Awujale of the Ijebu Kingdom

=== Chiefs and princes ===
- Abibatu Mogaji (1916–2013), business magnate
- Abiola Dosunmu
- Adeniran Ogunsanya
- Afe Babalola
- Bisoye Tejuoso
- Christopher Sapara Williams
- Efunroye Tinubu
- Efunsetan Aniwura (c. 1820s - 1874), second Iyalode of Ibadan, slavetrader
- G.B.A. Coker, (1917-1991), Justice of the Supreme Court of Nigeria
- Gaha (fl. 18 century), leader of the military in the Oyo Empire
- Gani Adams (b. 1970), activist, politician and the 15th Aare Ono Kakanfo of Yorubaland
- Henry Fajemirokun, (1926-1978), trade unionist, industrialist and philanthropist
- H.O. Davies (1905-1989), lawyer, journalist, trade unionist, thought leader and politician
- John Otunba Payne (1839–1906), Nigerian sheriff, administrator and diarist
- MKO Abiola
- Moses Majekodunmi
- Oluyole
- Oguntola Sapara
- Richard Akinjide
- Roseline Osipitan
- Sarah Forbes Bonetta
- Sunday Igboho
- Tejumade Alakija
- T.O.S. Benson
- Yemi Elebuibon
- Yemisi Adedoyin Shyllon

== Sports ==
=== Football (soccer) ===
- Abdulwaheed Afolabi
- Adebayo Adeleye (b. 2000), goalkeeper
- Adebayo Akinfenwa
- Ademola Lookman
- Arnaut Danjuma
- Asisat Oshoala
- Ayila Yussuf
- Babajide Collins Babatunde
- Brian Fok
- Bukayo Saka
- David Alaba
- Dele Adeleye
- Dele Aiyenugba
- Dele Ajiboye
- Dele Alli
- Dominic Solanke
- Emmanuel Adebayor
- Eniola Aluko
- Femi Ajilore
- Fikayo Tomori
- Folarin Balogun
- Funso Ojo
- Ibraheem Jabaar
- Jamal Musiala
- Jamil Muhammad
- Jodel Dossou
- John Fashanu
- Junior Ajayi (b. 1996), Nigerian professional footballer
- Junior Olaitan (b. 2002), Beninese professional footballer
- Karim Adeyemi (b. 2002), German professional footballer
- Kevin Schade (b. 2001), German professional footballer
- Leon Balogun (b. 1988), defender for the Nigeria national football team
- Manuel Akanji (b. 1995), Swiss professional footballer
- Mathieu Adeniyi (b. 1987), Beninese football player
- Michael Obafemi (b. 2000), Irish professional footballer
- Mohammed Nur (b. 2002), Nigerian international footballer who plays as a striker
- Mudashiru Lawal (1954-1991), Nigerian footballer who played as a midfielder
- Nathan Delfouneso
- Nathan Tella (b. 1999), English professional footballer who plays as a midfielder
- Olufolasade Adamolekun
- Omar Sowunmi
- Obafemi Martins (b. 1984), Nigerian professional footballer
- Patrick Owomoyela (b. 1979), German former professional footballer
- Rabiu Afolabi
- Rasheedat Ajibade
- Rasheed Yekini (1963-2012), Nigerian professional footballer who played as a striker
- Razak Omotoyossi (b. 1985), Beninese professional footballer
- Sammy Ameobi
- Saturnin Allagbé (b. 1993), player for the Benin national football team
- Sheyi Ojo
- Segun Odegbami (b. 1952), Nigerian former professional footballer who played as forward
- Simon Sohm
- Sone Aluko
- Shola Ameobi (b. 1981), Nigerian former professional footballer who played as a striker
- Steve Mounie
- Taiwo Awoniyi
- Taye Taiwo (b. 1985), Nigerian professional footballer
- Thomas Sowunmi
- Tobi Jnohope, footballer
- Tobi Sho-Silva (b. 1995), English professional footballer
- Tosin Adarabioyo (b. 1997), English professional footballer
- Tosin Aiyegun
- Yakubu Aiyegbeni (b. 1982), Nigerian former professional footballer who played as a striker

==== Football coaches ====
- Festus Onigbinde (b. 1938), Nigerian football manager
- Segun Odegbami (b. 1952), Nigerian former professional footballer who played as a forward
- Yemi Tella (c. 1951 - 2007), coach of the Nigerian football team

=== Basketball ===
- A. J. Edu
- Alex Antetokounmpo
- Ayo Dosunmu
- Bam Adebayo
- Gani Oladimeji Lawal Jr.
- Giannis Antetokounmpo
- Hakeem Olajuwon
- Kostas Antetokounmpo (b. 1997), Greek professional basketball player
- Michael Olowokandi (b. 1975), Nigerian former professional basketball player
- Olu Famutimi (b. 1984), Canadian professional basketball player
- Thanasis Antetokounmpo (b. 1992), Greek professional basketball player
- Victor Oladipo (b. 1992), American professional basketball player

=== Combat sports ===
- Anthony Joshua (b. 1989), British professional boxer and two-time former unified world heavyweight champion
- Israel Adesanya (b. 1989), Nigerian-born New Zealand professional mixed martial artist, kickboxer, and former professional boxer
- Benny Adegbuyi (b. 1985), Romanian kickboxer and professional boxer
- Muhammed Lawal (b. 1981), American professional wrestler and retired mixed martial artist
- Ola Afolabi (b. 1980), British professional boxer

=== Volleyball ===
- Foluke Akinradewo (b. 1987), indoor volleyball player

=== American football ===
- Kabeer Gbaja-Biamila (b. 1977), former American football defensive end

=== Ice hockey ===
- Jarome Iginla

=== Track and field athletes ===
- Daley Thompson
- Femi Ogunode
- Karim Olowu
- Olabisi Afolabi (b. 1975), retired track and field athlete from Nigeria
- Oludamola Osayomi
- Olusoji Fasuba (b. 1984), Nigerian sprinter
- Tobi Amusan (b. 1997), Nigerian hurdler who also competes as a sprinter. World record holder in the 100m hurdles.
- Yakubu Adesokan (b. 1979), Nigerian powerlifter

=== Squash and Table tennis ===
- Segun Toriola (b. 1974), Nigerian professional table tennis player
- Quadri Aruna (b. 1988), Nigerian professional table tennis player

== Music ==
=== African ===
==== Pre-2000s ====
- Abass Akande Obesere (b. 1965), Fuji musician
- Adewale Ayuba
- Angélique Kidjo
- Ayinla Kollington
- Ayo Bankole
- Bola Are
- Dunni Olanrewaju
- Ebenezer Obey
- Funmi Aragbaye
- Haruna Ishola
- Fatai Rolling Dollar
- Fela Kuti
- Hubert Ogunde
- I. K. Dairo
- K1 De Ultimate (b. 1957), Nigerian fuji musician
- King Sunny Adé
- Lagbaja
- Lara George
- Majek Fashek
- Mega 99
- Ojo Ade
- Orlando Owoh
- Remi Aluko
- Saheed Osupa
- Sikiru Ayinde Barrister
- Shina Peters
- Toby Foyeh
- Sunny Ade
- Wasiu Alabi Pasuma
- Yinka Ayefele
- Yusuf Olatunji (1905-1978), Nigerian Sakara drum player

==== Post-2000s ====
- 9ice (b. 1980), Nigerian musician, songwriter and dancer
- Adekunle Gold (b. 1987), Nigerian highlife singer, songwriter and graphic designer
- Aramide (b. 1985), Nigerian afro-soul singer and songwriter
- Aṣa
- Asake
- Ayọ
- Ayo Jay
- Ayo Maff
- Ayra Starr
- Barry Jhay
- Bella Shmurda
- Brymo
- CDQ
- Chinko Ekun
- D'banj
- Darkoo
- Davido
- DJ Cuppy
- Dotman
- Eedris Abdulkareem
- eLDee
- Falz
- Femi Kuti
- Femi Leye
- Fireboy DML
- Jamopyper
- Jaywon
- JME
- Joeboy
- KSI (Born in Watford, London, United Kingdom, has Yoruba ethnicity)
- Kizz Daniel
- Bad Boy Timz
- Korede Bello
- Ladipoe
- L.A.X
- Laycon (b. 1993), Nigerian media personality, rapper, singer and songwriter
- Lil Kesh (b. 1994), Nigerian singer, rapper and songwriter
- Little Simz
- Lojay
- Lyta
- Magixx (singer)
- Maleek Berry (b. 1987), British-Nigerian record producer and recording artist
- Mayorkun (b. 1994), Nigerian singer, songwriter and pianist
- MohBad
- Mr Eazi
- Mz Kiss
- Naira Marley
- Niniola
- Not3s
- Odunsi the Engine
- Olamide
- Olu Maintain
- Oxlade (singer)
- Portable
- Qdot
- Queen Fumi
- Reekado Banks
- Reminisce
- Ruger
- Seun Kuti
- Seyi Shay
- Skepta
- Shola Allyson
- Simi
- Small Doctor
- Sound Sultan
- Taio Cruz
- Tems
- Teni
- Tiwa Savage
- Tope Alabi
- Wale
- Wande Coal
- Wizkid
- Yemi Alade
- Yinka Ayefele
- Ycee (b. 1993), Nigerian rapper, singer and songwriter
- Zeynab
- Zlatan (b. 1994), Nigerian singer, songwriter, musician and dancer

==== Directors and DJs ====
- Clarence Peters
- DJ Cuppy
- Director K
- DJ Caise, Nigerian disc jockey
- DJ Jimmy Jatt (b. 1966), Nigerian disc jockey
- DJ Neptune (b. 1990), Nigerian disc jockey and record producer
- DJ Spinall (b. 1984), Nigeriand disc jockey, record producer, songwriter, label executive and media personality
- DJ Xclusive (b. 1980), Nigerian disc jockey, recorder producer and recording artist
- DJ Tunez
- D'Tunes
- Kiddominant (b. 1992), Nigerian recording producer, songwriter and artist
- Pheelz (b. 1994), Nigerian record producer and songwriter

=== Diaspora ===
- August Agbola O'Browne
- Babatunde Olatunji
- Chamillionaire
- Darkoo
- Ibeyi
- Jme
- Kevin Olusola
- Keziah Jones
- Labi Siffre
- Lola Falana
- Mo Jamil (b. 1995), English singer
- Rotimi
- Sade Adu
- Seal
- Skepta
- Taio Cruz
- Tosin Abasi
- Tunde Baiyewu (b. 1965), British singer
- Wale (b. 1984), American rapper

== Modelling and fashion ==
- Deola Sagoe
- Yetunde Barnabas (b. 1990), Nigerian model, beauty queen, actress and film producer
- Mowalola Ogunlesi (b. 1994), Nigerian fashion designer and musician

== Culinary arts ==
- Adejoke Bakare The first black female chef in the world with her own Michelin-starred restaurant, Chishuru, and is currently the only black female chef in the world running a Michelin-starred kitchen today.

== Science and technology ==
- Ayodele Awojobi (1937-1984), Nigerian academic, author, inventor, social crusader and activist
- Babatunde Ogunnaike (b. 1956), American chemical engineer
- Ilesanmi Adesida (b. 1949), Nigerian American physicist
- John Dabiri, Nigerian-American aeronautics engineer
- Kunle Olukotun, computer scientist
- Kofo Akinkugbe
- Olusegun Adewoye (1947-2015), researcher in ceramics science and engineering, physical metallurgy and corrosion engineering
- Oye Gureje (b, 1952), Nigerian psychiatrist
- Silas Adekunle
- Soni Oyekan
- T. M. Aluko (1918-2010), Nigerian writer and engineer
- Winston Wole Soboyejo (b. 1964), American materials scientist

== Theatre ==
- Akpororo, Nigerian stand-up comedian, vocalist and actor
- Abiodun Duro-Ladipo (b. 1941), Nigerian actress and singer
- Gbenga Adeboye (1959-2003), Nigerian singer, comedian, radio presenter and master of ceremony
- Shank Comics, Nigerian comedian
- Koffi Idowu Nuel (b. 1977), Nigerian entertainer, comedian, musician and actor
- Taaooma (b. 1999), Nigerian comedian, content creator, cinematographer and social media influencer

== Online influencers ==
- Jackie Aina
- KSI
- Tobi Brown
- Stephanie Coker
- Deji
- Niko Omilana
- Bobrisky
- KingKennyTV
- Dami Olonisakin a.k.a. Oloni
- Taiwo Ogunlabi (AFTV) a.k.a. Ty

== Military ==
- Abayomi Olonisakin (b. 1961), retired Nigerian General, former Chief of Defence Staff
- Adekunle Fajuyi (1926-1966), first military Governor of the former Western Region, Nigeria
- Adesola Nunayon Amosu
- Akinloye Akinyemi
- Babatunde Elegbede
- Benjamin Adekunle
- David Bamigboye
- Kayode Are
- Michael Bamidele Otiko
- Oladipo Diya
- Olagunsoye Oyinlola
- Olusegun Obasanjo
- Suraj Abdurrahman
- Theophilus Bamigboye
- Tolulope Arotile
- Tunde Idiagbon
- Victor Banjo (1930-1967), Colonel in the Nigerian army, accused of being a coup-plotter

== Business people ==
- Adebayo Ogunlesi
- Antonio Deinde Fernandez
- Bola Shagaya
- Candido da Rocha
- Chief E. O. Ashamu
- Damola Adamolekun
- Femi Otedola
- Fola Adeola
- Folorunsho Alakija
- Funke Opeke
- Hannah Awolowo
- Kase Lawal
- Maya Horgan Famodu
- Mike Adenuga
- Molade Okoya-Thomas
- Razaq Okoya
- Tope Awotona

== Religion ==
=== Christianity ===
==== Anglican ====
- Isaac Oluwole, (1852-1932), Nigerian bishop of Sierra-Leonean and Egba heritage
- Peter Akinola (b. 1944), former Anglican Primate of the Church of Nigeria
- Samuel Ajayi Crowther (c. 1809 - 1891), Yoruba linguist and first African Anglican Bishop of West Africa
- Samuel Johnson
- Seth Kale

==== Catholic ====
- Anthony Olubunmi Okogie
- John Onaiyekan
- Matthew Kukah
- G.J. Afolabi Ojo

==== Pentecostal ====
- Daniel Olukoya
- David Oyedepo
- E.A. Adeboye
- Eunice Olawale
- Gabriel Olutola
- Matthew Ashimolowo
- Sunday Adelaja
- T. B. Joshua
- Tunde Bakare
- Joseph Ayo Babalola
- Timothy Oluwole Obadare
- W.F. Kumuyi

==== Other ====
- Samuel Oshoffa (1909-1985), founder of the Celestial Church of Christ

=== Islam ===
- Abu-Abdullah Adelabu
- Sheikh Adam Al-Ilory (1917-1992), Benin-Nigerian Islamic Scholar

=== Yoruba Religion ===
- Yemi Elebuibon
- Wande Abimbola (b. 1932), religious leader, university professor and politician

== Law, activism and advocacy ==
- G.B.A. Coker
- Abiodun Williams
- Adetokunbo Ademola
- Afe Babalola
- Augustus Molade Akiwumi
- Beko Ransome-Kuti
- Bola Ajibola
- Femi Falana
- Femi Oluwole (b. 1990) British activist and commentator
- Frederick Rotimi Williams
- Funmilayo Ransome-Kuti
- Gani Fawehinmi
- Gbenga Olawepo-Hashim
- Kayode Eso
- Sunday Igboho
- Taslim Olawale Elias
- Yemisi Ransome-Kuti
- Zuriel Oduwole
- Ladosu Ladapo

== Writers ==
=== Yorùbá language ===
- Adebayo Faleti (1921-2017), Nigerian poet, journalist, writer, Nollywood film director, actor, Africa's first stage play director
- Afolabi Olabimtan (1932-2003), Nigerian politician, writer and academic
- Akinwunmi Isola (1939-2018), Nigerian playwright, novelist, actor, dramatist, culture activist and scholar
- Bakare Gbadamosi (b. 1930), Yoruba poet, anthropologist and short story writer from Nigeria
- Daniel O. Fagunwa (1903-1963), Nigerian Yoruba author who pioneered the Yoruba language novel
- Duro Ladipo (1926-1978), Yoruba dramatist
- Isaac Delano
- Folahan Odunjo
- Obo Aba Hisanjani
- Olatubosun Oladapo
- Tade Ipadeola
- Wale Ogunyemi

=== English language ===
- Amos Tutuola
- Bayo Ojikutu
- Bernardine Evaristo
- Bim Adewunmi
- Biyi Bandele
- Bolu Babalola
- Femi Osofisan
- Funso Aiyejina
- Helen Oyeyemi
- Lola Shoneyin
- Natasha Bowen
- Ola Rotimi
- Olufemi Terry
- Pelu Awofeso
- Sophie Oluwole
- Tade Thompson
- Taiye Selasi
- Teju Cole
- Tolu Akinyemi
- Tolu' A Akinyemi
- Tomi Adeyemi
- Wole Soyinka
