= Akinyemi =

Akinyemi is a surname. Notable people with the surname include:

- Adeleke Akinyemi (born 1998), Nigerian footballer
- Akinsola Akinyemi (born 1993), Norwegian footballer
- Akinloye Akinyemi (1954–2012), Nigerian Army officer
- Bolaji Akinyemi (born 1942), Nigerian professor
- Chris Akinyemi, American musician
- Dipo Akinyemi (born 1997), English footballer
- Folake Akinyemi (born 1990), Nigerian-Norwegian sprinter
- Johnathan Akinyemi (born 1988), British-Nigerian canoeist
- Mary Akinyemi (born 1954), Nigerian sprinter
- Michael Akinyemi (born 1947), Nigerian bishop
- Tolu Akinyemi, Nigerian writer and poet
- Tolu' A. Akinyemi, Nigerian writer and poet
