= Gbemisola =

Gbemisola is a given name. Notable people with the name include:

- Gbemisola Abudu, Nigerian-American entrepreneur
- Gbemisola Adeoti, Nigerian academic
- Gbemisola Ikumelo, British actress
- Gbemisola Saraki (born 1965), Nigerian politician
- Titilope Gbemisola Akosa, Nigerian environmentalist
