= Agbara Nla: The Return =

2026 Nigerian film

- Theatrical release poster
- Directed by: Damilola Mike-Bamiloye; Joshua Mike-Bamiloye
- Written by: Damilola Mike-Bamiloye
- Produced by: Chris Odeh
- Starring: Mike Bamiloye; Gloria Bamiloye; Philip Olubakin; Damilola Mike-Bamiloye
- Music by: Joshua Mike-Bamiloye
- Production company: Mount Zion Faith Ministries
- Distributed by: Nile Entertainment
- Release date: 1 October 2026
- Running time: 154 minutes
- Country: Nigeria
- Languages: English & Yoruba

Agbara Nla: The Return is a 2026 Nigerian faith-based drama film directed by Damilola Mike-Bamiloye and Joshua Mike-Bamiloye. It is a modern reimagining of the 1993 Mount Zion production Agbara Nla and was released in Nigerian cinemas on 1 October 2026. The film features Mike Bamiloye (returning as his previous character in the 1993 version), Philip Olubakin, Damilola Bamiloye, Kolade Abiodun, Gloria Bamiloye, Damilola Mike-Bamiloye and others. Agbara Nla: The Return recorded the biggest first-day gross for a Nollywood title and the biggest opening for a faith-based film, grossing over ₦70m in sales. Later in its opening week it made ₦170m breaking Nigerian box office. This was the highest non December opening in Nollywood history.

== Plot summary ==
Agbara Nla: The Return continues the story of Isawuru, a powerful herbalist and deity who has troubled the Muwonleru village for so many years, leading to killings of kings and chiefs, who refused to abide by his rule of engagement. Two believers, Olabode and Olatomi leave their city and their job, to take up a missionary duty and take the gospel to the village, leading to a spiritual war and battle between their faith and Isawuru's spiritual power.

== Selected cast ==
- Mike Bamiloye as Isawuru, the feared powerful village herbalist
- Philip Olubakin as Olabode, the urban Christian who travelled to Muwonleru village to spread the gospel.
- Mosiko Remilekun Adesina as Olatomi, the wife to Olabode
- Gloria Bamiloye as Olori
- Damilola Mike-Bamiloye as Kola
- Omolara Ayoola as Paulina

== Release and distribution ==
Released on 1 October 2026, Agbara Nla: The Return recorded over ₦70m in sales on its first day of release at the cinema. It was distributed by Nile Entertainment, and the production was done in collaboration between Mount Zion Faith Ministries, Circuits (Circuit Streams), and Sozo Films.
