= Teenage Love =

Teenage Love may refer to:

- Teenage Love (film), a 1991 Indian Malayalam film
- Teenage Love (album), a 1994 album by Cold Chisel
- Teenage Love, a 1960 album by Jerry Fuller
- "Teenage Love" (song), a 1988 song by Slick Rick
- "Teenage Love", a 1957 song by Frankie Lymon & the Teenagers
- "Teenage Love", a 1981 song by Eddie Meduza
- "Teenage Love", a song by Michael Cox
- "Teenage Love", a song by Stephen Jameson as Nosmo King
- "Teenage Love", a song by Magic Wands from Magic Love & Dreams EP
- "Teenage Love", a 2011 song by Chris Akinyemi
