= Iseyin =

City in Oyo, Nigeria

Iseyin Iseyin-Okeogun
- LGA and town
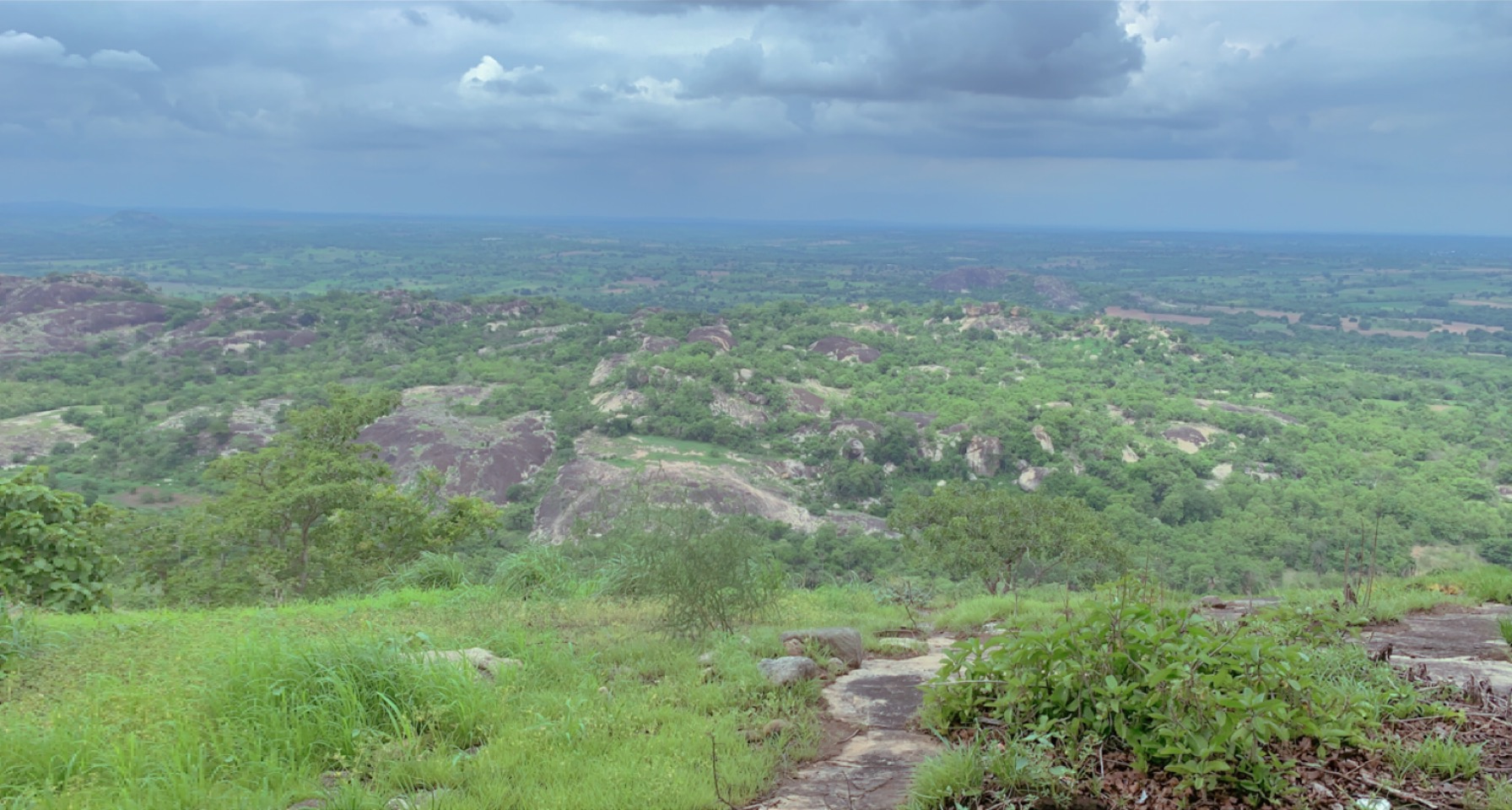
- Motto(s): Iseyin oro, oro ọmọ ebedi mọkọ
- Interactive map of Iseyin
- Location within Nigeria
- Coordinates: 7°58′N 3°36′E
- Country: Nigeria
- State: Oyo State

Government
  - Local Government Chairman and the Head of the Local Government Council: Muftau Osuolale (PDP)

Area
  - Total: 1,458 km^{2} (563 sq mi)

Population (2022 est)
  - Total: 365,300
  - Density: 250.5/km^{2} (648.9/sq mi)
- Time zone: UTC+1 (WAT)
- Postal code: 202101
- National language: Yorùbá

Short Oral history of Iseyin in Onko Language by a native speaker

Iseyin is a town located in Oyo, Nigeria. It is approximately 100 km (62 mi) north of Ibadan. The town was estimated to have a population of 236,000, according to United Nations 2005 estimate, which increased to 362,990 in 2011, and has a total land mass of 2,341 km^{2} (904 sq mi). Its inhabitants are mostly of Yoruba origin and its ruler is the Aseyin of Iseyin, with the current being Oba Sefiu Oyebola Adeyeri III, Ajirotutu I.

== Education ==
The town houses College of Agriculture and Renewarable Natural Sciences of Ladoke Akintola University of Technology, Iseyin campus. The town also has a private Polytechnic named SAF Polytechnic, Iseyin, a Government Technical College and the Oyo State NYSC (National Youth Service Corps) permanent orientation camp.

The town has a number of secondary schools like Greater Love Model College, SAF Poly International School, Kelani College Iseyin, Saint Thomas College, Iseyin District Grammar School, Baptist Secondary Grammar School, Iseyin, Ansarudeen Grammar School, St John Catholic Grammar School, Muslim Grammar School, ETC.

Iseyin also has an ultra modern private Digital Library named Raji Oke-Esa Memorial Library, the library was commissioned by the Nigeria former president, General (Rtd.) Olusegun Obasanjo, and Ebedi Writers' Residency situated at the hill-side of Barracks area of the city. This International Residency has brought great writers, journalists and authors all over the world including Africa's first Nobel Laurel, Prof. Wole Soyinka, Jumoke Verissiomo, Funmi Aluko, Richard Ali, Paul Liam and others.

List of Higher institution in Iseyin:

- LAUTECH College of Agricultural Sciences and Renewable Natural Resources, Iseyin Campus
- SAF Polytechnic, Iseyin
- Iseyin College of Science and Health Technology, Iseyin
- The West African Polytechnic, Iseyin (Proposed permanent site)

== Industry ==
Iseyin is the headquarters of Oke-Ogun zone of Oyo state. A Sugar Cane Processing Company was established in the town. The primary industry of the area is cotton-based textiles. Iseyin is the fourth largest built environment in Oyo state, after Ibadan, Ogbomoso and arguably Oyo. Iseyin is also known as the home of Aso Òkè.Aso Òkè or Òfì is a popular traditional fabric mostly used for ceremonies amongst the Yoruba people of Nigeria.

Other industries located in Iseyin include:

- British American Tobacco
- Cympul Organic Agrofood, Iseyin
- Oyo Sugar Processors Limited, Iseyin
- Kitovu Technology Company, Iseyin
- McAgric International, Iseyin
- Psaltry Mechanized Agriculture, Iseyin
- Friesland Campina (Wamco)
- C. Woermann Nigeria Limited Iseyin Distribution office

== Radio ==
The following are the list of current terrestrial Frequency Modulator (FM) Radio station operating in Iseyin:

- KASMON FM Station 87.8
- AFRAS FM Station 107.7

== Agriculture ==
Tobacco is grown in Iseyin, amongst other food and cash crops, it is as a result of this that a big tobacco company - British American Tobacco - has a "leave office" in the town. Iseyin is part of the Oke-Ogun towns referred to as the "food basket" of Nigeria.

Because of sustainable annual rainfall in the area, the major agricultural activities are farming, hunting, fishing, and food processing, among others. Iseyin produces virtually all farm produces such as yam, maize, cassava, plantain among many others.

== Ikere Gorge dam ==
Ikere Gorge dam is located in the town, it was said to be the second largest dam when it was discovered alongside Kanji dam during President Obasanjo's regime (Military). Ikere gorge dam is a man-made dam, It is a source of water for communities in Iseyin and its suburbs. During the rainy season, the dam swells to full capacity. Tons of fish are produced from the dam, which can be a source of IGR for the government. The dam when maintained, is capable of generating electricity for the whole South-West states of Nigeria. The dam can be used for irrigation and tourist center.

== Traditional weaving ==
The primary industry of Iseyin is cotton-based textiles, and Iseyin reputed as the home of Aso Ofi or Aso Oke, a popular traditional fabric worn on special occasions by the Yoruba usually for coronation, chieftaincy, wedding engagement, festivals, naming ceremony, and other important events.

The maiden Aso-Ofi festival was observed on September 27, 2016, during World Tourism Day. The festival was conceptualized to showcase and celebrate the locally made fabric.

== Climate ==
With high temperatures and little precipitation, the town has a tropical climate, with winters being less precipitous than summers.

Climate data for Iseyin (1991–2020)
| Month | Jan | Feb | Mar | Apr | May | Jun | Jul | Aug | Sep | Oct | Nov | Dec | Year |
|---|---|---|---|---|---|---|---|---|---|---|---|---|---|
| Record high °C (°F) | 38 (100) | 41 (106) | 40 (104) | 40 (104) | 37 (99) | 37.3 (99.1) | 34 (93) | 31.3 (88.3) | 33 (91) | 34.5 (94.1) | 37 (99) | 37 (99) | 41.0 (105.8) |
| Mean daily maximum °C (°F) | 34.2 (93.6) | 35.5 (95.9) | 35.0 (95.0) | 33.1 (91.6) | 31.5 (88.7) | 29.9 (85.8) | 28.1 (82.6) | 27.4 (81.3) | 28.8 (83.8) | 30.3 (86.5) | 32.7 (90.9) | 33.9 (93.0) | 31.7 (89.1) |
| Daily mean °C (°F) | 27.6 (81.7) | 29.0 (84.2) | 29.2 (84.6) | 28.1 (82.6) | 27.1 (80.8) | 25.9 (78.6) | 24.7 (76.5) | 24.2 (75.6) | 25.1 (77.2) | 26.0 (78.8) | 27.4 (81.3) | 27.4 (81.3) | 26.8 (80.2) |
| Mean daily minimum °C (°F) | 20.9 (69.6) | 22.4 (72.3) | 23.4 (74.1) | 23.1 (73.6) | 22.6 (72.7) | 21.9 (71.4) | 21.3 (70.3) | 20.9 (69.6) | 21.3 (70.3) | 21.7 (71.1) | 22.1 (71.8) | 20.9 (69.6) | 21.9 (71.4) |
| Record low °C (°F) | 14 (57) | 12 (54) | 16 (61) | 16 (61) | 18 (64) | 15 (59) | 16 (61) | 16.5 (61.7) | 15 (59) | 19 (66) | 14 (57) | 13.8 (56.8) | 12.0 (53.6) |
| Average precipitation mm (inches) | 9.2 (0.36) | 15.6 (0.61) | 66.9 (2.63) | 107.7 (4.24) | 156.8 (6.17) | 168.6 (6.64) | 150.0 (5.91) | 146.8 (5.78) | 219.2 (8.63) | 176.7 (6.96) | 23.8 (0.94) | 2.9 (0.11) | 1,244.1 (48.98) |
| Average precipitation days (≥ 1.0 mm) | 0.6 | 1.4 | 4.4 | 6.9 | 10.5 | 11.8 | 11.3 | 11.2 | 14.9 | 12.0 | 2.0 | 0.4 | 87.3 |
| Average relative humidity (%) | 66.6 | 70.5 | 78.6 | 84.3 | 87.1 | 88.5 | 89.1 | 89.1 | 89.1 | 87.9 | 80.3 | 70.1 | 81.8 |
Source: NOAA

== Notable people ==
- Professor Peller, magician (1941-1997)
- Olukayode Ariwoola, former Chief Justice of Nigeria
- Shina Peller, businessman and Politician
- Gbemisola Adeoti, academic and poet
- Afeez Oyetoro, comic actor
- Nike Peller, actress
