= Igangan =

Town in Oyo State, Nigeria

Coordinates: 7°40′50″N 3°11′00″E

Igangan is a town in Ibarapa North Local Government Area of Oyo State, Nigeria. Its neighbouring towns are Ayete and Tapa.

On June 5 2021, this town came into prominence for attacks by unknown assailants, which according to Premium Times Nigeria, claimed the lives of 26people.

These killings attracted the condemnation of key leaders of the South West region in Nigeria including Governor Rotimi Akeredolu of Ondo State as well as Oduduwa Republic agitator, Sunday Igboho.

The zip code for Igangan is 201007.
