= Oyebola =

- Gender: Unisex
- Language: Yoruba

Origin
- Origin: Nigeria
- Meaning: "Royalty meets wealth or Honor meets wealth)"
- Region of origin: South-west Nigeria

Oyebola (Oyebola.ogg) (meaning "royalty meets wealth" or "honor meets wealth") is a Yoruba Unisex given name.

== Notable people with the name ==
- James Oyebola (10 June 1961 – 27 July 2007) was a Nigerian and British heavyweight boxer
- Oba Sefiu Oyebola Adeyeri III, Ajirotutu I (Ajirotutu I) is the 30th and current Aseyin of Iseyinland, a traditional state in Oyo, Nigeria.
