= Akande =

- Gender: Male
- Language: Yoruba

Origin
- Origin: Nigeria
- Region of origin: South western Nigeria

Akande audio is both a surname and a given name of Yoruba origin. Notable people with the name include:

- Adebisi Akande (born 1939), Nigerian politician
- Alex Tayo Akande (born 1989), Hong Kong footballer
- Laolu Akande, Nigerian journalist, editor, scholar and lecturer
- Nike Akande (born October 29, 1944), Nigerian industrialist
- Zanana Akande (born 1937), Canadian politician
- Akande Ajide (born 1985), Nigerian footballer
- Wahab Adekola Akande (born 1967), Nigerian diplomat
