= Kofo =

Kofo is a Nigerian given name. Notable people with the name include:

- Kofo Abayomi (1896–1979), Nigerian ophthalmologist and politician
- Kofo Akinkugbe, Nigerian technology entrepreneur
- Kofoworola "Kofo" Omogoriola Olanipekun, a fictional character on the U.S. TV series Bob Hearts Abishola

== See also ==
- KOFO, a radio station from Ottawa, Kansas, United States
