= Shina Peller =

Nigerian Politician and Entrepreneur

The Honourable Shina Peller

Member House of Representative
- In office 10 June 2019 – 29 May 2023

Personal details
- Born: 14 May 1976 (age 50)
- Party: Peoples Democratic Party
- Education: Ladoke Akintola University of Technology
- Occupation: Politician and Businessman

Shina Abiola Peller (born 14 May 1976) is a Nigerian entrepreneur, politician, Industrialist, and a Member of the 9th National Assembly. He is the chairman and chief executive officer of Aquila Group of Companies and Club Quilox. Shina Peller holds both the chieftaincies titles of Ayedero of Yoruba land and Akinrogun of Epe land, Lagos, Nigeria.

== Background ==
Shina Abiola Peller is the son of Alhaja Silifat and Professor Moshood Abiola Peller. He grew up in a Muslim home. He traces his origins to Iseyin, Oyo State in South-Western Nigeria. He studied Chemical Engineering at Ladoke Akintola University of Technology, Ogbomosho, Nigeria, where he obtained his first degree in 2002. Subsequently, he obtained a master's degree in Business Management also from Ladoke Akintola University of Technology in 2013. He served in Abia State in 2003 to fulfill the mandatory one-year service of National Youth Service Corps (NYSC) required of all Nigerian graduates.

== Political career ==
Peller is a member of the All Progressive Congress (APC), and declared his intention to contest under the platform of the All Progressives Congress as a member of the Federal House of Representative representing the Iseyin/Itesiwaju/Iwajowa/Kajola Federal Constituency in Oyo State.

On 5 October 2018, Shina Peller won the primary election for House of Representatives candidate for lseyin/ltesiwaju/ Kajola/lwajowa Federal constituency on the platform of the All Progressive Congress (APC) for the 2019 Nigeria General election and won the seat. He won the seat for House of Representatives in his constituency on 23 February 2019 but lost his election to return as a senator. He is currently running for the Nigerian Senate under the umbrella of APM Party.
