= Omoboriowo =

- Language: Yoruba

Origin
- Meaning: Child is more valuable than money
- Region of origin: West Africa

Omoboriowo is a Yoruba surname meaning "Child is more valuable than money". Notable people with the surname include:

- Akin Omoboriowo, Nigerian politician
- Bayo Omoboriowo, Nigerian photographer
