= Akinkugbe =

Akínkùgbé
- Gender: Male
- Language: Yoruba

Origin
- Origin: Nigerian
- Meaning: The valiant one didn't die in vain. or Warriors don't die in vain.
- Region of origin: South West, Nigeria

Akínkùgbé is a Nigerian surname. It is a male name and of Yoruba origin, which means "The valiant one didn't die in vain, or Warriors don't die in vain.". The name Akínkùgbé is common among the Ondo people of the Southwest, Nigeria.

== Notable Individuals with the Name ==
- Kofo Akinkugbe (fl. 1998), Nigerian businesswoman.
- Ladipo Akinkugbe (1933–2020), Nigerian professor.
