= Adeoti =

Adeoti is a surname. Notable people with the surname include:

- Gbemisola Adeoti, Nigerian academic
- Jordan Adéoti (born 1989), French footballer
