= Titilope =

Titilope (Yoruba: Títílọpẹ́, lit. '(Our) Gratitude is forever') is a feminine given name in Yoruba. Notable people with the name include:

- Adenike Titilope Oladosu (born 1994), Nigerian climate activist
- Anne Titilope Suinner-Lawoyin (born 1981), Nigerian businesswoman, TV presenter and beauty pageant titleholder
- Titilope Gbemisola Akosa, Nigerian lawyer, climate activist and human rights activist
- Titilope Sonuga (born 1985), Nigerian poet, engineer and actress
