= Nike Peller =

Nigeria actress and illusionist

- Occupation: Actress
- Parent: Professor Peller

Nike Peller is a Nigerian-born Yoruba film actress, thespian and stage illusionist. Known to be the daughter of the late Professor Peller, Nike holds the chieftaincy of the Yeye Agbasaga of Erin Osun, a title which was bestowed on her in 2010.

== Selected filmography ==
- Akosile (2023) as Big Mommy
- Atupa (2018) as Folake Agba
- Àtànpàkò Otún (2007) as Pade's Wife
- Sekere (2007)
- Ayé Ajekú (2006)
- Botife (2004) as Moki
- Eko O'tobi 1 (2004)
- Eko O'tobi 2 (2004)
- Fila Daddy (2003)
- Ogede Didun (2003) as Remi

== See also ==
- List of Yoruba people
