= Priscilla Achapka =

Nigerian environmental activist

Priscilla Achakpa
- Occupation: environmental activist
- Notable work: Women Environment Programme (WEP)

Priscilla Mbarumun Achakpa is a Nigerian environmental activist. She is the founder and Global President of the Women Environment Programme (WEP) that provides women with sustainable solutions to everyday problems. Just before that, she was the executive director of WEP.

In Water Supply and Sanitation Collaborative Council, Achakpa serves as the national coordinator for Nigeria. She is the chair of the board of the Abaagu Foundation for youth empowerment. In the United Nation Environmental Programme, she was elected as a co-facilitator.

== Early life and education ==
Achakpa was married at age 16, became a mother of three children, and then her husband died, leaving her as a young widow. Her husband's family disinherited her and she enrolled in school earning degrees in Developmental Studies, Business Administration and Management, followed by postgraduate degrees in Management and Business Administration, and in Developmental Studies. She completed a Ph.D. from the University of Business Engineering and Management, Banja Luka and a Professional Certificate from Harvard University Business School.

== Career ==
From 1989 to 2001, Achakpa worked at Savannah Bank and started taking courses in environmental issues to position herself for a long career in community work as an environmental activist. The primary focus of her work addresses the need to incorporate gender-related matters into water resource planning and management. She has worked as a Nigerian delegate for the Women's Caucus as well as the Women and Gender Constituency with the UN Climate Summit. She was elected as a co-facilitator of the United Nations Environmental Programme's "Women's Major Group." In this role, she consulted with national women's networks on UN environmental policies and procedures and events, as well as worked as a fundraiser for the Women's Major Group. She is the chairman of the board of Abaagu Foundation for youth empowerment and social reintegration.

She is the Founder and Global President (formerly executive director) of the NGO Women Environment Programme (WEP) that has impacted women by providing sustainable solutions to everyday problems. WEP's major focus is on climate change. They have offices in Nigeria, Burkina Faso, Togo, the United States. In 2012 she participated in the negotiations at the United Nations Conference on Sustainable Development (Rio+20); her main contribution was to add gender as a key critical component in sustainable development goals. She has spoken at the UN assembly in Nairobi on the importance of women's human rights in relations to environmental activism.

Achakpa also holds the position of the National Coordinator for Nigeria of the Water Supply and Sanitation Collaborative Council (WSSCC), an affiliate of the United Nations Office for Project Services (UNOPS).

In 2015, Vogue magazine featured her in an article on the 2015 United Nations Climate Change Conference that identified her as one of 13 "formidable women leading the way".

== Awards and honors ==
Achakpa has been a Fellow of Ashoka since 2013. She was named an "Eco Hero" by Germany's Deutsche Welle and by Nigeria's Channels Television. She received an environmental innovation award from Deutsche Welle. Achakpa was brought to the spotlight by the Nobel Women's Initiative as a prominent activist.

== See also ==
- Titilope Gbemisola Akosa
