= Joshua Mike-Bamiloye =

Nigerian Gospel Singer

- Born: Joshua Mike-Bamiloye; 7 November 1991 (age 34); Ilesa, Osun State, Nigeria
- Other names: Jaymikee
- Occupation: Gospel singer
- Spouse: Tolulope Mike-Bamiloye

Joshua Mike-Bamiloye, also professionally known as Jaymikee (born 7 November 1991) is a Nigerian gospel singer. He is known for his songs "Hello Hello Sister", "I Will Love" and "Adara". He is the second son of the Nigerian Christian Filmmakers, Mike Bamiloye and Gloria Bamiloye.

== Early life and education ==
Joshua Mike-Bamiloye was born in Ilesha, Osun State, Nigeria on 7 November 1991. Joshua grew up in Ibadan. He attended Bodija High School, then later went to Bowen University, Iwo, Oyo, Nigeria, where he studied mass communication.

== Career ==
Mike-Bamiloye began his music career at the age of 14. He rose to the limelight from his christian songs. He released some albums such as One Man Nation, Heaven, A Living Sacrifice, Rebirth, and Generation Next 1&2.

He is signed under the Mount Zion music studio (which serves as his record label), where he produces and release his songs.

Apart from been a gospel singer, Joshua is also active in several other areas. He is a gospel skit maker, known for his popular skit series Jay and Josh. He is also a background music artist, a portrait painter (owner of Jaymikee art), a graphic designer, known for his humorous graphic designs, and a cartoonist, having produced several Christian comic books.

== Personal life ==
Joshua married Tolulope on 2 November 2019. They have one son, Jason Mike-Bamiloye. He welcomed his second child in August 2024

== Discography ==
- I Will Rise
- Dide
- Oruko Jesu
- We Need the Fire
- Sunset at Midday
- Carry Go
- I Have a Father
- Adara
- Eyes on You
- I Will Be There
- Story of a Lady
- Olori Ogun
- Here for You
- Spirit Move
- Hello Hello Sister
- Talebale
- I Will Love
- Forces Against My Soul

== Videography ==
• Nasara

• Hello Hello Sister ft Teemikee

• Here For You

• Carry Go

• Heaven

• Spirit Move ft Darasimi

• Trust in you

• Imole

•Talebale

• Dide

• The Train ft Lawrence Oyor

,• Iyawo ft Teemikee
