= G.J. Afolabi Ojo =

Nigerian professor and geographer

Professor Gabriel Jimoh Afolabi Ojo (1 November 1929 – 30 August 2020) was a Nigerian academic, teacher, and leader in the Catholic Church.

== Early life and education ==
He was born on 1 November 1929 in Ado-Ekiti, Nigeria.

Professor Ojo began his education at St. George's Catholic School in Ado-Ekiti, where he attended primary school from 1936 to 1942. He later attended St. John Bosco's Training College in Ubiaja (1944–1945) and obtained his Senior Cambridge School Certificate in December 1948. Demonstrating his dedication to learning, he earned the Teachers' Higher Elementary Certificate in 1950 and the London Matriculation in June 1951.

In 1953, Professor Ojo pursued further studies at the National University of Ireland. There, he graduated with top grades (first-class honors) in 1956, becoming the first African to achieve this distinction in Geography and Economics from his institution. His academic journey continued, and he earned a Master of Arts degree with the highest honors in 1957. He received a Ph.D. from the same university in 1963.

== Career ==
Professor Ojo began his career as a teacher in 1946 in Ado-Ekiti. He later taught at St. Joseph's College in Ondo State, where he became vice principal. In October 1959, he joined the Nigerian College of Arts & Science in Enugu as a lecturer and was promoted to Head of the Department in 1960–1961. He was also one of the founding members of the University of Ife, where he became Acting Head of the Geography Department in 1962. On 1 October 1970, he was appointed professor of geography. Professor Ojo also served as Dean of the Faculty of Social Sciences in 1972 and later as Dean of the Faculty of Administration from 1976 to 1977.

Besides his work in education, Professor Ojo played a significant role in creating long-distance learning opportunities in Nigeria. He led the planning committee for the Open University System in Nigeria from 1980 to 1981 and subsequently became the first Vice Chancellor of the National Open University of Nigeria, serving from 1981 to 1984.

Apart from his academic life, Professor Ojo was an active member of the Catholic Church, where he held various positions. He served as the founding National Secretary of the Catholic Laity Council of Nigeria (CLCN) from 1973 to 1981 and later became the National President of the Laity Council from 1986 to 1994. His dedication to the Catholic Church was recognized when he was awarded the Papal Knighthood of Knight of St. Gregory the Great in 1975.

== Bibliography ==
Here is a list of books authored by Professor Gabriel Jimoh Afolabi Ojo:

- Yoruba Palaces: A Study of Afins of Yoruba Land (University of London Press, 1966)
- Yoruba Culture: A Geographical Analysis (University of London Press, 1966)
- Co-author of Geography for Us (Books One and Two, 1967)
- Objective Questions and Answers in School Certificate and General Certificate of Education: Ordinary Level Geography (Parts I and II, 1968, 1969)
- Our Home Land (1969)
- Elements of Physical and Human Geography (Books Three, Four, and Five, 1971)
- North America and Monsoon Asia (1973)
- Europe and the Union of Soviet Socialist Republics (1974)
- West Africa in the series Study Map Notebooks, W.M. Collins Sons and Company Ltd, Glasgow (1972)
- Editor of The Church and the State in Education (1981)
- Co-editor of The History of the Catholic Church in Nigeria (1982)
- Co-editor of Ten Years of the National Laity Council of Nigeria: The Role of the Layperson in the Church in Nigeria (1986)
- Co-editor of Activities of the Laity at the Parish Level (1986)
- Co-editor of The Soul of the Nation (1986)
- Co-editor of The Laity and the New Era of Evangelisation (1987)
- Co-editor of The Spirituality of Laypersons (1990)

== Award and recognition ==
Professor Ojo was also recognized in academic and professional circles. He was named a Fellow of the Geographical Association of the Union of Soviet Socialist Republics (USSR) and received an honorary title as a Mountaineer in the State of West Virginia, USA. In 2004, he was honored with the title of Commander of the Order of the Niger (CON) for his outstanding service to Nigeria and humanity.

== Personal life ==
In his personal life, Professor Gabriel Jimoh Afolabi Ojo was married to Florence Bukunola Ojo (née Adeyanju), and they had three sons and three daughters. He died on 30 August 2020.
