= Yemi Elebuibon =

Nigerian writer and linguist

Chief Àràbà Yemi Elebuibon
- Born: Ifáyẹmí Ọ̀ṣúndàgbonù Ẹlẹ́búìbọn; 1947 (age 78–79); Osogbo, Nigeria
- Occupations: Author, priest, poet writer, teacher, linguist
- Writing career
- Language: Yoruba, English
- Genres: History, grammar/linguistics, religion, poetry, plays
- Subjects: Yoruba culture, Yoruba history, Yoruba language, Yoruba religion
- Notable works: Owonrinsogbe; Ifa Olokun Asorodayo (Documentary); Apetebii: The Wife of Orunmila; The Adventures of Obatala I & 2
- Website: araba-osogbo.com

Ifáyẹmi Ọ̀ṣúndàgbonù Elebuibon (born 1947) is a Yoruba and Nigerian writer, poet, author, linguist, and a world-famous Ifa priest. His plays and films have received worldwide acclamation for his pursuit of the preservation of Yoruba culture and heritage. He also serves as a traveling lecturer in several institutions including at the department of African language and literature at the Obafemi Awolowo University and Black Studies at the San Francisco State University and at the Wajumbe Cultural Institution in California.

== Early life ==
Elebuibon was born in 1947 in Osogbo to Akínrìndé Àkàndé Ẹlẹ́búìbọn (c. 1885 – 1957) an Ifa priest and hunter, and Ṣíjuwọya Abeje Ẹlẹ́búìbọn (née Awóníyì). Elebuibon comes from a long line of hunters, priests, herbalists, and warriors. His father was claimed to be a descendant of the legendary warrior Olutimehin, one of the founders of the city of Osogbo. His mother was born into a family of priests who worshipped Oya and Ifa. The title "Araba" is given to the chief Ifa priest of Osogbo, and this title was held by his maternal grandfather, Kẹ̀hìndé Adéyẹmi Awóníyì, the longest serving Araba of Osogbo. His maternal grandmother was Oyawenu Awoniyi. The names of Elebuibon and his parents are clear in describing the origins and traditions of the family. Elebuibon's mother's name, Sijuwoya means "Open your eyes to see/worship Oya," showing her parents worshipped Oya. "Elebuibon" originates from a nickname of his father's meaning "Owner of gunpowder," showing that he was a hunter. Elebuibon's mother's maiden name Awoniyi means "The Oracle is valuable," the oracle referring to the Ifa.

Elebuibon's father was a polygamist who had 6 wives, and Elebuibon's mother was the youngest wife. His father had many children, but at the time many of them had died in infancy. This phenomenon is known in the Yoruba culture as abiku. Elebuibon's father and Elebuibon's maternal grandfather (Awoniyi) were close Ifa contemporaries and it was revealed that to solve this problem, Elebuibon's father would have to marry a female child of the Araba chieftaincy family. This girl was Elebuibon's mother. However, when he married Sijuwoya, she still had the Abiku problem, and had 2 children who died in infancy. To figure out a problem with this, he consulted the Ifa and it was determined that she would have to use water and give offerings to the goddess Osun (in the river Osun). Soon later, she had her only surviving child, Elebuibon. The circumstances of his birth can be seen in the names Elebuibon was given. His first name Ifayemi means Ifa befits me and his other name Osundagbonu refers to the goddess Osun, who they believed gave them Elebuibon.

== Career ==
Elebuibon began training as an Ifa priest by his father in 1951 when he was 4 years old. He continued this rigorous training in the traditional arts until his father died when he was only 10 in 1957. He was then put under the guidance of Chief Faniyi Ajani (the Agbongbon-Awo of Osogbo), another well trained Ifa priest who most likely was a contemporary of Elebuibon's father and grandfather. After training for another 10 years, he became an official Babalawo in 1967. He did not attend formal schooling but self-educated himself. He then became an actor for Duro Ladipo's famous plays including Ọba kò so. He then became associated with the National Black Theatre, in which he currently serves as a cultural advisor. He then began to publish several books and papers in both Yoruba and English. He also wrote many traditional Yoruba plays based on Yoruba figures (known as ewi in Yoruba). His traditions morality drama “IFA OLOKUN ASORODAYO” (a popular phrase praising Ifa and Orunmila culled from Odu-Ifa was presented as a series on Nigeria national television network. In an effort to conserve Yoruba history and culture that he felt was being lost to Western influences, he established several cultural institutions in Nigeria, including Ancient Philosophy International in Osogbo, a centre dedicated to teaching African Traditional Religion and Performing Arts. He was appointed the Vice Chairman of Board of Traditional Medicine, Osun State, and he is presently the President of International Congress of Orisa Tradition and culture, Nigeria Chapter. Through his efforts, the Osun-Osogbo Grove was named a UNESCO World heritage site and in 2005, UNESCO declared in its third proclamation of World Masterpieces that the Ifa Divination System in Nigeria was one of the Oral and Intangible Heritage of Humanity to be preserved and protected. He continues to go on lecture tours in addition to practicing his traditional religion.
