= Ojo Ade =

Nigerian gospel singer

- Born: October 10, 1959 (age 66); Ikeji Ile, Osun State, Nigeria
- Citizenship: Nigerian
- Occupations: gospel singer; songwriter; evangelist
- Years active: 1977 - present

Ojo Ade (born October 10, 1959) is a Nigerian gospel singer, songwriter and evangelist.

== Early life ==
He was born on October 10, 1959, at Ikeji Ile, a city in Osun State southwestern Nigeria. He was educated at St. Judges Anglican Church at Ikeji Ile before he left for Lagos State southwestern Nigeria for a vocational program in Electronics. In 1987, he proceeded to Calvary International Bible College under the tutelage of Rev. Anjorin, Ibadan based pastor and preacher.

== Career ==
He began his music career in 1977 when he Joined a church choir but established his personal musical group in 1979. In 1981, two years after he established his musical group, he released his debut album titled Jesun To Funmi and later released Satani Ko Sinmi. He is one of the gospel singers who had made significant contributions to gospel music in Nigeria.
