= Mount Zion Faith Ministries =

Christian Film Company

Mount Zion Faith Ministries International
- Formation: 5 August 1985
- Founder: Mike Bamiloye
- Founded at: Ibadan, Nigeria
- Type: Christian drama and film ministry
- Headquarters: Ibadan, Oyo State, Nigeria
- Region served: Worldwide
- President: Mike Bamiloye
- Key people: Gloria Bamiloye, Damilola Mike-Bamiloye
- Website: mountzionfilm.com

Mount Zion Faith Ministries is a Christian film production company based in Ibadan, Nigeria, which specialises in casting, producing and distributing Christian films and drama films. It was founded on the 5th of August 1985 by Christian writers and actors Mike Bamiloye and Gloria Bamiloye, and consists of Christians from several countries, who work to promote Christian teaching through motion pictures.

On July 11, 1986, the ministry staged its first play in St. Margaret Girls' school, Ilesha. In 1987, Mike Bamiloye resigned so he could concentrate on Mount Zion Faith Ministries.

The first film produced by Mount Zion Faith Ministries was "The Unprofitable Servant" in 1990. Since then it has produced more than 200 films, including Ide Esu, The Beginning of The End, Perilous Times, Abattoir, House on Fire, One Careless Night, Agbara Nla and Agbara Nla: The Return.
