= Timothy Oluwole Obadare =

Nigerian televangelist

- Born: April 11, 1930. Age 83; Ilesa, Osun State, Nigeria
- Other name: Baba Obadare
- Citizenship: Nigerian
- Occupations: pastor; preacher; evangelist
- Years active: 1957 - 2013
- Website: Obadare Official website

Timothy Oluwole Obadare (April 1930 - March 2013, Age 83.) was a Nigerian televangelist and the General Evangelist of Christ Apostolic Church (CAC).

== Early life ==
Obadare was born in Ilesa, now part of Osun State, southwestern Nigeria, to David and Felicia Obadare, a pastor and petty trader, respectively. The majority of documents date Obadare's birth to 1930.

Obadare was educated at the Apostolic Church Primary School in Ise-Ilesa but dropped out due to blindness resulting from a chronic smallpox epidemic.

== Evangelism ==
Obadare was baptized in the Holy Spirit in 1949. He worked as an evangelist with The Apostolic Church (TAC) from 1953 to 1957, following which he joined the Christ Apostolic Church at the behest of Joseph Ayo Babalola. In 1954, he studied at the Apostolic Church Theological Seminary.

Obadare founded the World Soul Winning Evangelistic Ministry. Prior to his death in March 2013, he was the President of the Interdenominational Ministers’ Association of Nigeria (IMA).

Obadare received an honorary Doctor of Divinity degree from the Trinity College of Ministerial Arts and an honorary Doctor of Ministry degree from St. John's University in Missouri.
