= Gloria Bamiloye =

Nigerian dramatist, film actress, producer and director

- Born: 4 February 1964 (age 62); Ilesa, Osun, Nigeria
- Education: Oyo State College of Education
- Occupations: Actress; Producer; Director; Dramatist; Evangelist
- Years active: 1985–present
- Known for: Gospel Films Production
- Spouse: Mike Bamiloye
- Children: 3, including Joshua Mike-Bamiloye

Gloria Olusola Bamiloye (born 4 February 1964) is a Nigerian dramatist, film actress, producer, director and evangelist. She is a co-founder of Mount Zion Drama Ministry.

== Early life ==
Born on 4 February 1964 in Ilesa, a city in Osun State, southwestern Nigeria, she was raised a Muslim but converted to Christianity. She undertook English language and religious studies at Oyo State College of Education in Ilesha. She continued her education and received teacher preparation at the Divisional Teachers Training College in Ipetumodu.

== Career ==
She met Mike Bamiloye in 1983 and eventually married him. Together, they co-founded the Mount Zion Faith Ministry on August 5, 1985. She has starred in, directed and produced several Christian Nigerian movies and dramas. In 2002, she wrote a book titled The Anxiety of Single Sisters.

== Personal life ==
Mike and Gloria first met at Oyo State College of Education in Ilesha. On October 8, 1988, they married. Gloria was 24, and Mike was 28. However, because his only employment was his full-time involvement in a theatrical ministry, the marriage went against her parents' wishes. She has three children and six grandchildren.

== Selected filmography ==
- Agbara nla (1992)
- Apoti Eri
- Just A Little Sin
- Story Of My Life
- Blood on the Altar (2006)
- Wounded Heart
- The Great Mistake
- Busy but Guilty
- The Haunting Shadows 1 (2005)
- The Haunting Shadows 2 (2005)
- The Haunting Shadows 3 (2005)
- Broken Bridges (2012) as Rachael's Mother
- The Mobile Prison (2015) as Ordination Pastor
- Shackles 1 (2019)
- Shackles 2: Fetters of Iron (2020)
- Higher Calling (2020)
- My Mother-in-Law 1 (2020)
- My Mother-in-Law 2 (2020)
- My Mother-in-Law 3 (2020)
- My Mother-in-Law 4; episodes 1 - 4 (2021)
- Strategies 1 (2020)
- Strategies 2 (2020)
- Gbemi 1 (2022)
- Gbemi 2 (2022)
- Magdalene (2022)
- Stranded (2023) as Pastor's Wife
- My Dream (2023) as Mama Tunde

== See also ==
- List of Nigerian film producers
- List of Yoruba people
