= Sefiu Olawale Oyebola Adeyeri III =

Ruler of Iseyin, Nigeria (born 1969)

- Aseyin of Iseyinland
- Reign: 14 December 2023 – present
- Coronation: 14 December 2023
- Predecessor: Abdganiy Salawudeen Adekunle

Oba Sefiu Olawale Oyebola Adeyeri III (Ajirotutu I) is the 30th and current Aseyin of Iseyinland, a traditional state in Oyo, Nigeria. He ascended the throne on December 14, 2023, succeeding the late Oba Abdganiy Salawudeen Adekunle. In 2024 Adeyeri began a tour of the region as part of an effort promote unity and development across the Oke Ogun.
