= Mike Bamiloye =

Nigerian film actor, Evangelist(drama), producer, and director

Michael Abayomi Bamiloye
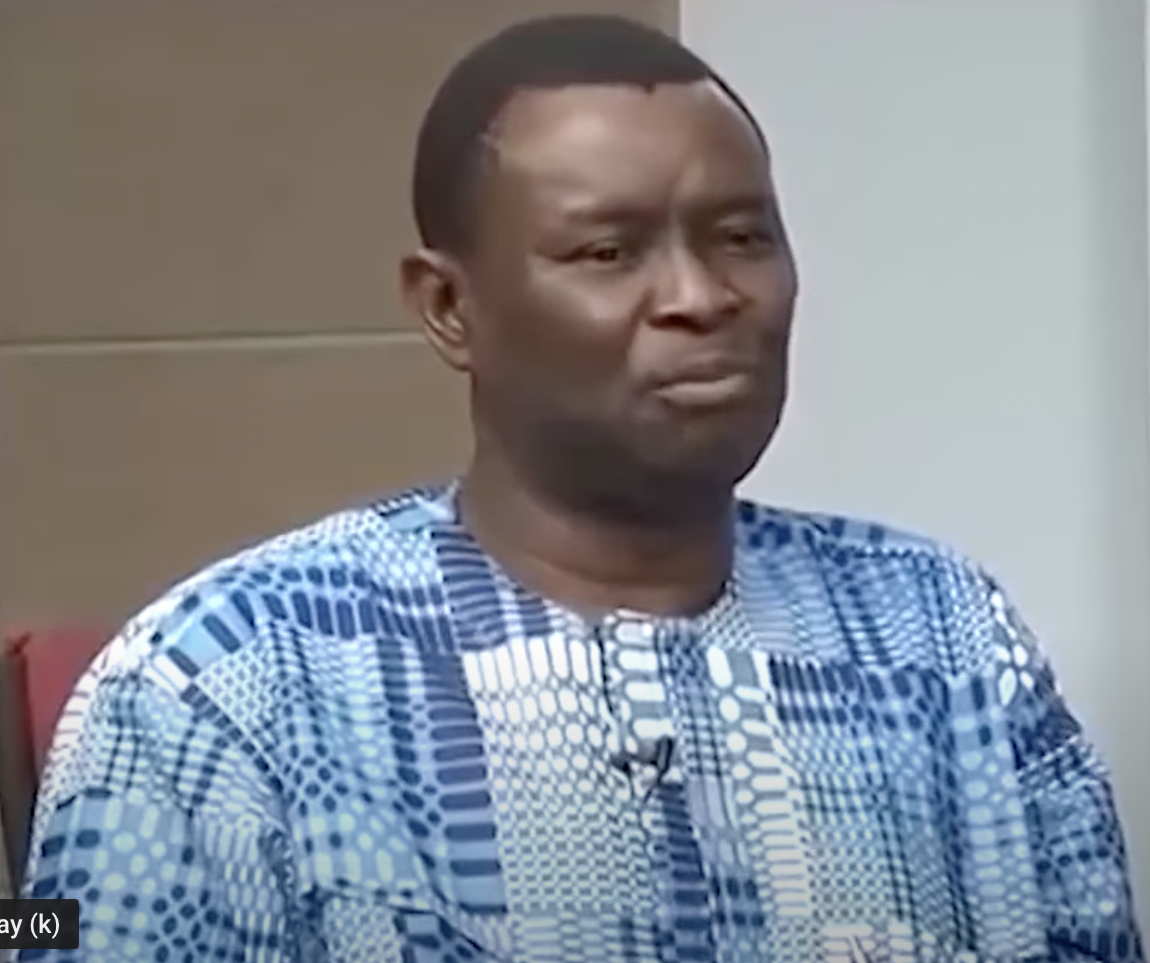
- Bamiloye in 2020
- Born: 13 April 1960 (age 66); Ilesa, Osun, Nigeria
- Citizenship: Nigerian
- Education: Divisional Teachers’ Training College
- Occupations: Evangelist; actor; filmmaker; producer; director; dramatist
- Years active: 1985–present
- Known for: Christian Drama
- Spouse: Gloria Bamiloye
- Children: Damilola Mike-Bamiloye; Joshua Mike-Bamiloye; Darasimi Oyor

Mike Abayomi Bamiloye (born 13 April 1960) is a Nigerian gospel film actor, dramatist, producer, and director. He is an evangelist and the founder and president of the film production company Mount Zion Faith Ministries and Mount Zion Television.

== Biography ==
Mike Bamiloye was born in Ilesa, a town in Osun State in southwestern Nigeria on April 13, 1960 but hails from Ijebu-Ijesa in Osun State. He was trained at the Divisional Teachers’ Training College at Ipetumodu where he began his career. Bamiloye founded Mount Zion on 5 August 1985. Bamiloye's debut drama Hell in Conference was staged at the National Christian Teachers Conference in 1986 at Ilesa in Osun State. He has featured, produced, and directed several Nigerian gospel films over the years. A movie that explains his early life and the beginning of his ministry was released in 2020 to celebrate his 60th birthday.

== Personal life ==
Mike Bamiloye has been married to Gloria Bamiloye, a Nigerian film actress and evangelist, since October 8, 1988 . Together, they have three children, Damilola Mike-Bamiloye, Joshua Mike-Bamiloye, and Darasimi Gomba-Oyor, all three of them are actors. He has six grandchildren.

== Filmography ==
Year	Film	Role	Notes	Ref(s)
2001	Apoti Eri			
1992	Agbara nla 1-4	as Isawuru		
2005	The Haunting Shadows 1		with Shade Agboola, Gloria Bamiloye	
2005	The Haunting Shadows 2			
2005	The Haunting Shadows 3			
2006	The Forgotten Ones 1-4			
2008	One Careless Night 1-5			
	The Ultimate Power 1-4			
	The Foundation			
	Broken Pitchers			
	Wounded Heart			
	Captive of the Mighty			
	Asise Nla			
	The Gods Are Dead			
2013	Journey in circle	Akande's father		
	Abejoye 1, 2 and 3	as Abejoye		
	Shackles 1 & 2	Gashiki		
2020	The Train (The journey of faith)			
2021	Abejoye season 4	Abejoye		
	Heart Pain	The Pastor & Doctor		
2022	Magdalene	The Pastor		
2023	Stranded	Baba	with Tokunbo Jarrett, Taiwo Adeniyi	

|2023 |Enoch: A Biopic Genera Overseer |Stranded |2024

== See also ==
- List of Yoruba people
