= Queen Fumi =

Beninise singer

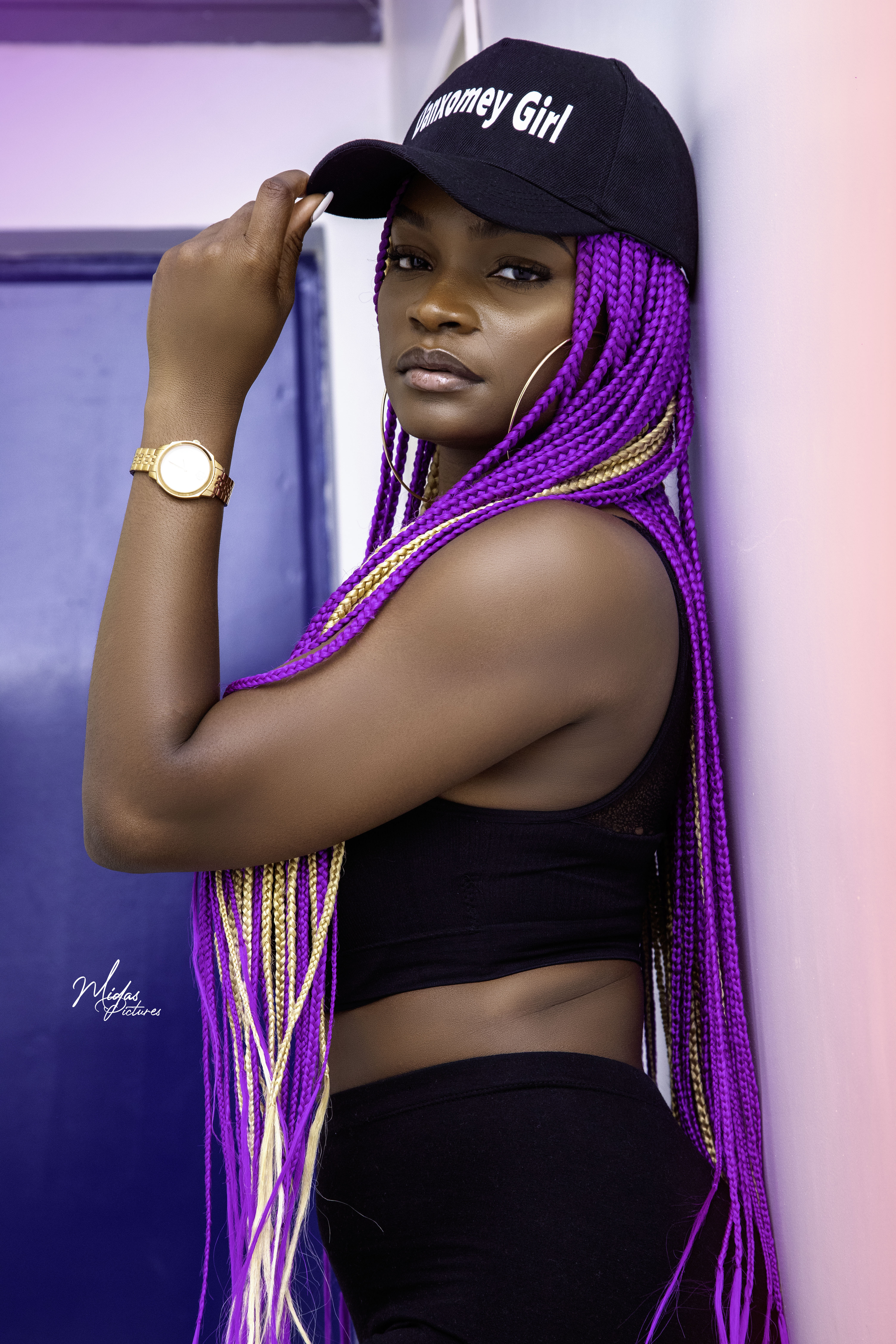
- Queen Fumi, 2022

Background information
- Born: Fumilayo Raimi; 13 March 1992 (age 34)
- Origin: Benin Republic
- Genres: Afropop; RnB
- Occupations: Musician, singer
- Years active: Present

Queen Fumi (born Fumilayo Raim) is a Beninese musician who debuted with her first single "Romantic Boy" in 2016. She released songs such as "Zero" and "Madame" in the first and latter parts of 2018, and "Coco" in the first part of 2019 respectively. Her latest collaboration with Gabonese musician Tina, titled "Affaire de Boy," has "further catapulted her into additional notoriety and gained her more audience in other parts of Africa and beyond".

== Early life ==
Fumilayo began her career in music during her college years, but her interest in music first emerged at the early age of 8. Starting at the age of 12, she participated in cultural performances organized by her colleagues and officially launched her formal music career in 2015, releasing her first acclaimed song in March 2016.

== Career ==
Queen Fumi developed a musical style that combines urban and traditional sounds from her hometown. She began her musical journey by showcasing her talent on various social media platforms before continuing with joining the Blue Diamond production label from Benin Republic in 2017, where she quickly moved through their ranks along with other Benin musicians such as Fanicko, Manzor, and Zeynab. After gradually gaining a high level of fame in the Benin Republic, she moved on to release the hit song 'Affaire de Boy' two years later, collaborating with popular Gabonese musician Tina, which brought her even greater career success. In 2020, rumors circulated about Fumi leaving her production label Blue Diamond, indicating that she was preparing to establish herself as a more independent Beninese artist.

== Awards and nominations ==
Year	Award ceremony	Prize	Recipient	Result	Ref
2019	African Talent Awards	Best African new artist	Herself	Nominated	

== Discography ==
- Zero, 2018
- Madame, 2018
- Coco, 2019
- Affaire de Boy, 2019
