= Gbemisola Abudu =

Nigerian-American Business Executive and Strategist

- Born: San Bernardino, California, U.S.
- Education: University of Wyoming (B.A.); Thunderbird School of Global Management (M.B.A.); Harvard Business School (Executive Education)
- Occupations: Business executive, strategist, entrepreneur
- Employer: BMGA Advisory
- Organizations: NBA Africa; BMGA Foundation (founder); ANAP Jets; Polo Luxury; Louis Vuitton; The Walt Disney Company; The Clorox Company; Atlantic Council
- Known for: Strategic leadership in global market expansion, cross-border partnerships, and institutional growth across emerging markets.
- Notable work: NBA Africa Triple Double Accelerator; 2023 NBA All-Star Afrobeats halftime show
- Awards: Sports Illustrated 100 Most Influential Black Women in Sports (2022); ISPO 30 Female Changemakers in Sports; MIPAD Global Top 100 Under 40 Black Enterprise Top 10 Black Leading Women in Sports

Gbemisola Abudu is a Nigerian-American business executive, entrepreneur, and strategic advisor with over two decades of experience building businesses and developing markets across Africa, the United States, and the Middle East.

She is the founder and managing principal of BMGA Advisory, a strategic advisory practice focused on market entry, market expansion, growth strategy, strategic positioning, and institutional strategy. Previously, she served as Vice President of NBA Africa and Country Head of NBA Nigeria, where she established and led the National Basketball Association’s operations in Nigeria.

Abudu is also a nonresident senior fellow at the Atlantic Council’s Africa Center . the founder of BMGA Foundation, which advances opportunities for women and girls, and the creator of the DAM Framework (Desire, Affinity and Monetization), which examines how organizations create sustainable long-term value

== Early life and Education ==
Abudu was born in San Bernardino, California and is Nigerian-American. She earned a bachelor’s degree in marketing and public relations from the University of Wyoming and an MBA from the Thunderbird School of Global Management. She later completed executive education at Harvard Business School .

== Professional life ==
Abudu's early career include roles with The Walt Disney Company , The Clorox Company, White & Case LLP, Jordan Investment Board, Louis Vuitton, Polo Luxury and ANAP Jets. Her work across these organizations included marketing, business development, luxury retail, investment promotion and market strategy.

Abudu joined NBA Africa as Vice President and Country Head of NBA Nigeria, establishing and leading the league’s operations in Nigeria. Her work included basketball and business development, youth and grassroots programming, partnerships and initiatives connecting basketball with Nigeria’s broader cultural and creative industries. During her tenure, she led or helped develop initiatives including NBA Meets Culture and the NBA Africa Triple-Double Accelerator and contributed to the NBA's 2023 all-star game Afrobeats Halftime show. She was the youngest and also the only black woman to run a league office. In 2022, Sports Illustrated named her as one of the "100 Most Influential Black Women in Sports in the World". She was also named as one of ISPO's 30 Female Changemakers Shaping the Future of Sports.

Following her tenure at NBA Africa, Abudu founded BMGA Advisory, a strategic advisory practice advising corporations, investors founders and institutions on growth, market entry and expansion, capital strategy, positioning and institutional strategy across Africa and global markets. Her work increasingly sits at the intersection of market development, culture, capital and institutional strategy.

Abudu developed the DAM Framework - Desire, Affinity and Monetization - a strategic framework for understanding how organizations and brands build long term value. Its central thesis is that organizations do not monetize simply because customers exist; they do so because they have earned the rights to. In September 2026, Abudu applied the DAM Framework to Uber’s withdrawal from Nigeria during an appearance on CNBC Africa’s Closing Bell.

In 2025, Abudu was listed as one of the Top 10 Black Women Leading in Sports by BlackEnterprise Magazine.

== Writing and thought leadership ==
Abudu writes on market development, culture, capital, institutional strategy, international engagement and the systems through which economic value is created and retained. In 2026, her published work examined US-Nigeria relations,nation branding, Africa - gulf economic ties, market expansion in Africa and the role of culture in economic infrastructure.

In a three-part series for Nairametrics, Abudu argued for treating culture as economic infrastructure and examined the ownership, financing, rights, distribution, measurement, and institutional systems that determine how cultural value is captured. She has also written for the Atlantic Council on the architecture of U.S - Nigeria engagement and for BusinessDay on market expansion and the DAM Framework.

== Philanthropy and Board Service ==
Abudu is the founder of BMGA Foundation, a non-profit organization focused on developing the next generation of women leaders. where she serves as a non-executive board member. The foundation's initiatives have included the BMGA Fellows Program, which was created to address skills and leadership gaps among young women transitioning from university into the workplace. Her work in philanthropy led to her recognition as one of the Most Influential People of African Descent (MIPAD) Global top 100 under 40, Abudu has served in board roles spanning higher education, philanthropy, design and institutional development.
