= Roseline Osipitan =

Yeye Oba of the Itori Kingdom

- Yeye Oba of the Itori Kingdom
- Born: Ondo State, Nigeria
- Spouse: Omoba Bola Osipitan
- House: Osipitan

Oloori Roseline Omolara Osipitan is a Nigerian business executive and Yoruba princess, who serves as the president and chairperson of the Independent Petroleum Marketers Association of Nigeria's Women Association. She is also the founder of First Royal Oil and Gas, and holds the chieftaincy title of the Yeye Oba of the Itori Kingdom.

== Biography ==
Oloori Roseline Osipitan was born in Ondo State, Nigeria. Osipitan works as a business executive in the Nigerian oil industry, where she is one of the first women executives. She serves as the president and chairperson of the IPMAN Women Association, a female equivalent to the Independent Petroleum Marketers Association of Nigeria. Ospitian is the founder of the First Royal Oil and Gas company. She is married to Omoba Bola Osipitan and is the Yeye Oba of the Itori Kingdom.
