= Chris Akinyemi =

Nigerian-American musician

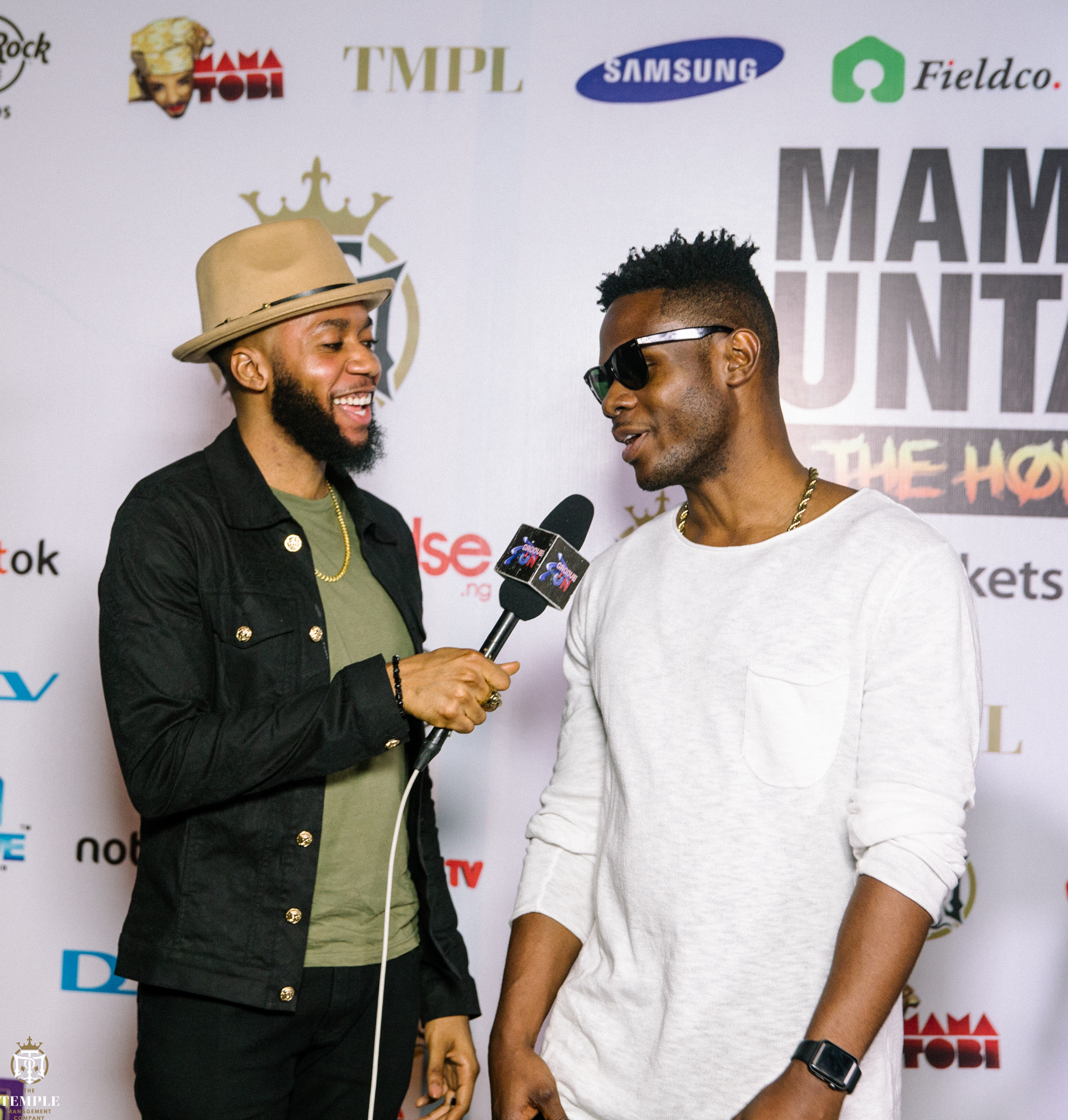
- Chris Akinyemi in 2017

Background information
- Also known as: Chris A
- Born: Newark, New Jersey, U.S.
- Genres: Afropop, Pop, Hip Hop, Afrobeat
- Occupation(s): Singer-Songwriter, Rapper
- Instrument(s): Guitar, Keyboards, Vocals, Drums
- Labels: Temple Music Limited

Christopher Akinyemi, better known by his stage name Chris Akinyemi (Sometimes shortened to ChrisA) is a Nigerian-American musician. He released his first single "Radio", which was featured on major music outlets such as mtvU, BET and other major media outlets.

On January 1, 2011 Chris Akinyemi released his second single Teenage Love. On January 17, 2011, his music video "Radio" premiered on mtvU and was featured on mtvU's "The Freshmen" and his music video was added to MTV and VH1. On January 24, 2011 Chris Akinyemi was interviewed on mtvU's "The Hot Seat".
