= Tolu Akinyemi =

Nigerian writer and poet

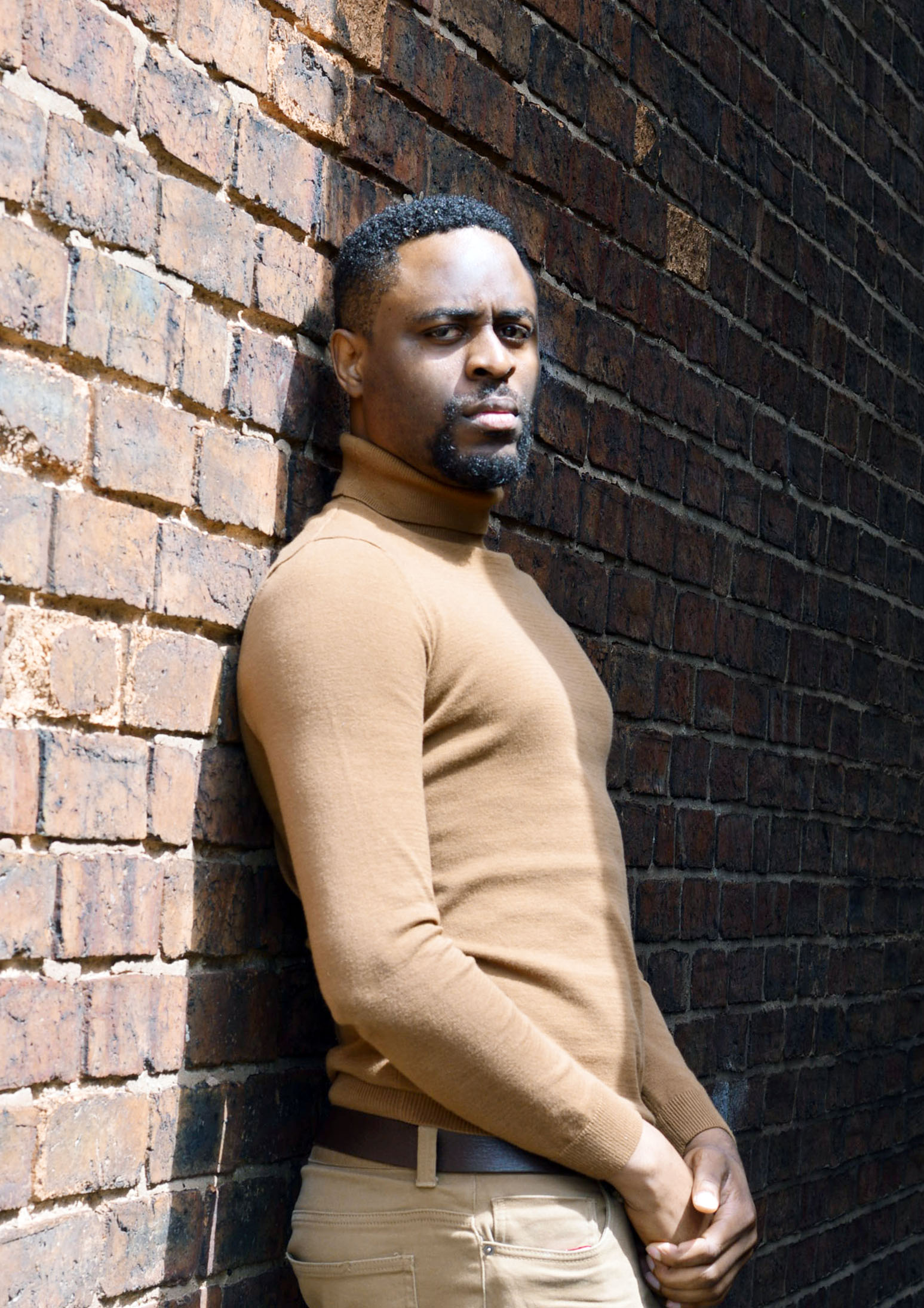
- Born: Toluwalope Akinyemi; Akure, Nigeria
- Other name: Poetolu
- Education: University of Greenwich, London, Federal University of Technology Akure
- Occupations: Writer, poet
- Notable work: Her Head Was A Spider's Nest (2021), Funny Men Cannot Be Trusted (2017), I Laugh at These Skinny Girls (2015), Your Father Walks Like A Crab (2013)
- Website: poetolu.com

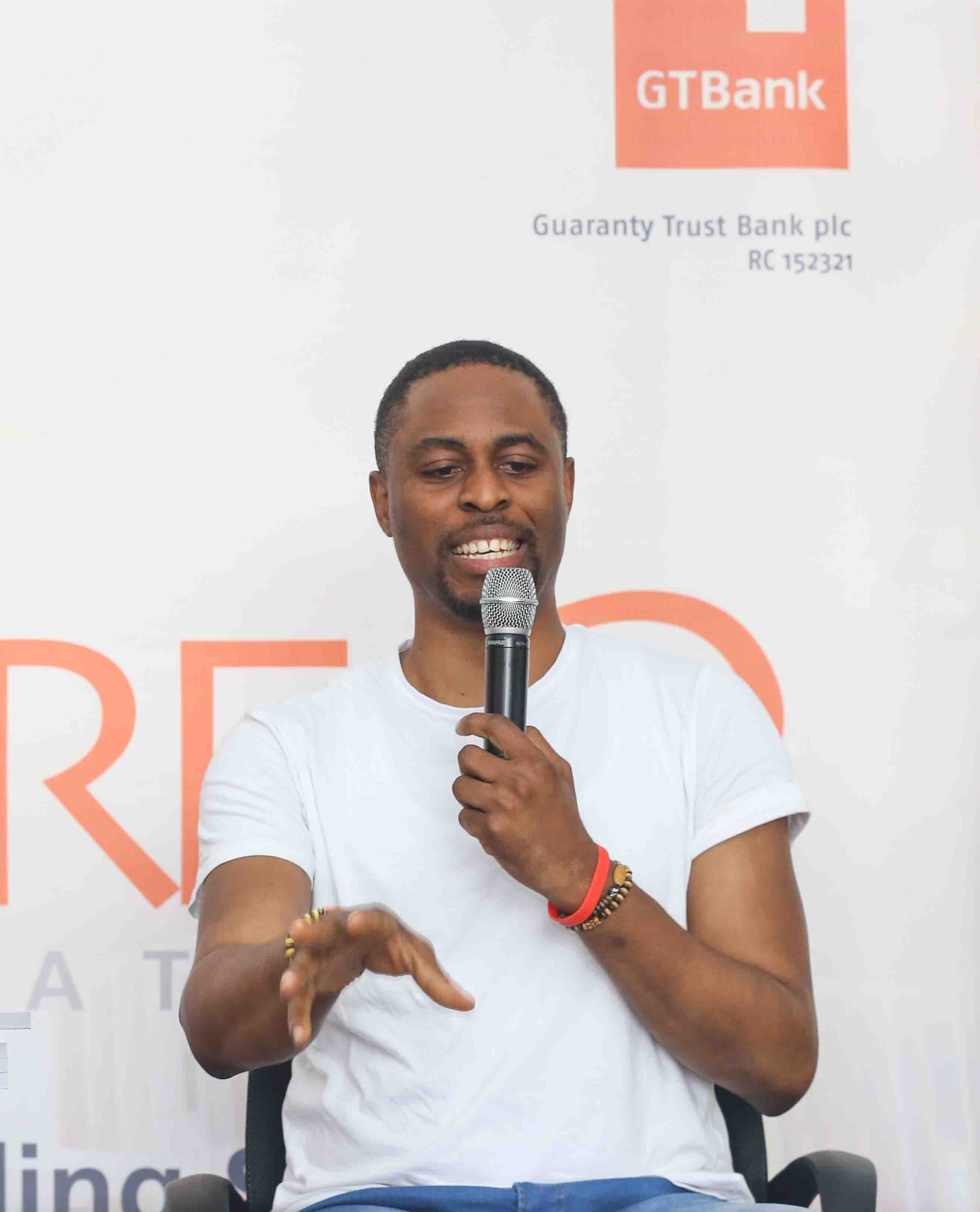
Akinyemi (Poetolu) in 2017 at a book reading event in Lagos, organised by GTB Bank Nigeria

Tolu Akinyemi, also referred to as Poetolu, is a Nigerian writer and poet. His work is notable for its relatable insights and humorous take on everyday human experiences.

== Biography and education ==
Tolu Akinyemi was born in Akure, Ondo State, Nigeria. His parents worked in the state government's civil service. He attended in the same city, Oyemekun Grammar School, where he was first an assistant senior prefect and later became the senior prefect. He then studied Architecture and Design at the Federal University of Technology Akure, earning a Bachelor of Technology degree in Architecture in 2008. In 2011, he obtained a Master of Science degree in Built Environment Studies from the University of Greenwich. He currently lives in London, England.

== Writing ==
Akinyemi is the author of four collections of poetry. His first collection Your Father Walks Like A Crab, published in 2013, was described by Lola Shoneyin as "a witty debut". In 2017 and 2018, Akinyemi was named one of "100 most influential Nigerian writers under 40". In 2017, he won the Nigerian Writers' Award (Poetry writer of the year) for his poetry collection I Laugh at These Skinny Girls. His works have been featured in advertisements, documentaries, and in cultural and literary publications such as the Association of Nigerian Authors anthologies, Forward Poetry's Great British Write-off Anthology, and Black History Month magazine. In 2017, he obtained the Arts Council England's "exceptional talent endorsement" as a creative writer. This was a part of the British Home Office's "exceptional talent visa" programme to attract to the United Kingdom, exceptionally talented individuals in fields such as the arts and sciences.

Akinyemi's writing has also been described as "poetry for people who hate poetry".

== Other works ==
In 2016, Akinyemi started writing the online Halima Series, an illustrated and humorous social commentary on popular culture and everyday experiences from the point of view of the fictional character called Halima. In 2022, Akinyemi appeared in a cameo role as "Shawn", on the Africa Magic show My Flatmates (Episode 133).

== Bibliography ==
- Her Head Was A Spider's Nest, 2021, ISBN 978-9785483475
- Funny Men Cannot Be Trusted. Heart of Words UK, 2017, ISBN 978-9785359763
- I Laugh at These Skinny Girls. Heart of Words UK, 2015, ISBN 978-9785359718
- Your Father Walks Like A Crab. Strange Ideas UK, 2013, ISBN 978-9789329199
