= Titilope Gbemisola Akosa =

Nigerian activist

- Born: Titilope Gbemisola Ngozi Akosa; Lagos, Nigeria
- Occupations: Lawyer; activist; environmentalist
- Years active: 2004–present
- Known for: Climate activism; human rights activism

Titilope Gbemisola Ngozi Akosa is a Nigerian environmentalist, climate justice advocate, lawyer, gender and social inclusive expert, and human rights activist. She is the founder and executive director for the non-governmental sustainability organization Centre for 21st Century Issues (C21st). She heads the law firm Titi Akosa & Co Nigeria. In 2015, she was the spokesperson for women and gender non-governmental organizations at the 2015 Paris Climate Treaty on the topic 'Towards a Gender Responsive Green climate fund in Africa'. She is currently working with Frederick Ebert Foundation and other stakeholders in Nigeria to establish a Coalition for Sociology-Ecological Transformation (CoSET) and also leads South West Nigeria, Women in Peacebuilding Network (WIPNET), a program of the West African Network for Peace-building (WANEP), Nigeria

Furthermore, Ms Akosa also is a member of the Pan African Climate Justice Alliance and currently chairs its Ethics committee

== Early life and education ==
Titilope Ngozi Akosa was born and brought up in Lagos State, Nigeria. At an early age, she attended both primary and secondary school education in Lagos State. During her stay in Lagos State, she then enrolled in the University for her Post-Secondary Education. Akosa graduated from the Lagos State University, Nigeria where she obtained her Bachelor of Laws degree (LL.B) and Barrister-at-Law (B.L) from the Nigerian Law School in 1992. She also obtained her Masters in Law (LL.M) from the University of Lagos Nigeria in 1996. As a law graduate, Titilope Akosa is a legal practitioner based on civil and criminal litigation and an active Human rights activist. She participated in various courses and training which include; Associate Membership Course, Chartered Institute of Arbitrators, U.K, Nigerian Branch, Lagos, Nigeria in April 2004, Monitoring and Evaluation Training held in Liberia by Forum For African Women Educationalist (FAWE), Kenya in August, 2006.

== Career ==
Titilope Akosa started as a practicing lawyer after her graduation and her call to the Nigerian bar. She went on to open the Law firm of Titi Akosa & Co with some of her other colleagues. She served as the head and a legal consultant trainer on human and women's rights, gender and climate change. Akosa started the non-governmental sustainability organization for Climate-Advocacy 'Centre for 21st Century Issues' (C21st) Nigeria and became its project coordinator.

She also participated in a project by the International Alliance of Indigenous Tribal Peoples of the Tropical Forests on a program tagged Indigenous Network for change project (IPNC), where she monitored and observed the GEF processes and how they relate to the Indigenous Peoples. She had said that her participation in the IPNC program has earned her enlistment in the rooster of experts on indigenous issues in West Africa.

== Advocacy ==
Titilope Akosa currently works on initiating project proposals, raising funds and seeing to the daily running of her organization. She also works as a legal consultant and trainer for national and international organizations both in Nigeria and abroad. Also, she does the launching, awareness and advocacy campaign on gender and climate change. She also facilitates and coordinates programs under advocacy campaign on capacity building training for decision makers, civil society groups and other relevant stakeholders on environmental stewardship, and gender and climate change. She advocates for the right of girl child education in Nigeria and that Nigerian government should do all necessary to secure the release of the missing Chibok and Dapchi girls who were kidnapped by Boko Haram.

In 2009, She led a research in collaboration with International Alliance of Indigenous and Tribal Peoples of the Tropical Forests, Henrich Boell Foundation and other local organizations to conduct research on gender and climate change. This was done in order to provide empirical evidence on mainstreaming Gender in Climate Change initiatives in Nigeria.

== See also ==
- Priscilla Achapka
