= Laolu Akande =

Nigerian journalist

Laolu Akande CFR
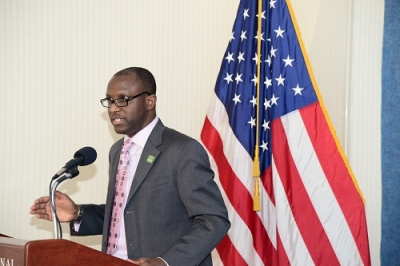
- Akande at National Press Club Washington DC, US
- Born: Ibadan, Nigeria
- Education: Loyola College, Ibadan
- Occupations: Journalist, writer

Laolu Akande , Officer of the Order of the Niger, OON, is a Nigerian journalist, editor, scholar and lecturer. He is currently the Editor in Chief of Empowered Newswire and the Host of the popular Inside Sources with Laolu Akande on Channels TV, Nigeria. He was the spokesperson of the vice president of Nigeria 2015-'23, Prof. Yemi Osinbajo, SAN. Before he was named Vice Presidential Spokesperson, Akande was reporting for Empowered Newswire, a US-based news agency which he had founded in New York. He was also a former North America Bureau Chief for The Guardian in New York City, United States.

== Early life and education ==
Akande was born in Ibadan, Oyo State. He attended Omolewa Nursery and Primary School and Loyola College, Ibadan. He completed his A-Levels at the Oyo State College of Arts and Sciences, Ile Ife. He graduated with a Bachelor of Arts degree in history from the University of Ibadan in 1990 and a master's degree in Communication and Language Arts from the same University in 1992.

== Career ==
Akande's career in Journalism started in 1989, first as a freelancer and in the following year as a Staff Reporter, with the Guardian Newspapers. He mainly covered the education beat. Akande's incisive coverage of the 1992 ASUU strike exposed the impasse between the Federal Government of Nigeria led by former head of state, General Ibrahim Babangida, and the striking lecturers.

Akande was a founding member of The News magazine team in 1993 as Senior Writer, and also Tempo publication, when the military government of the day banned The News for its staunch pro-democracy stance and reportage.

He remained with The News and Tempo until he joined the Nigerian Tribune in 1995 as a Special Projects Editor and later became the editor of the Tribune on Saturday title of the oldest newspaper in Nigeria, making him the youngest newspaper editor at the time. He was forced into exile to the United States in 1998 after his story, "Who wants Diya dead?" was published; not knowing that on the day of the publication, the Abacha junta will declare Oladipo Diya a coup plotter. This brought him in direct confrontation with the military government of the late General Sani Abacha and he had to leave Nigeria about 14 months later.

While in the United States, Akande worked with Newsday as an assistant editor. He wrote regular columns for Chatafrik.com and Nigeriaworld.com, two U.S.-based award-winning news websites, and freelanced for The Philadelphia Inquirer, Philadelphia Daily News and The News Journal of Delaware. Akande was also a Fellow of the Tribune Minority Editorial Training Program, METPRO. In 2004, he founded Empowered Newswire, a New York-based independent news agency reporting on Nigeria and Africa news from the US and North America.

Akande is regarded as the only Nigerian journalist to have interviewed a sitting American president in the White House when he interviewed former US President George W. Bush, at a White House African Reporters Roundtable. He has also interviewed eminent personalities, including Billionaire Bill Gates in New York on different occasions ahead of his annual philanthropy report; current US President Donald Trump for a Newsday story on how a staff of his organization saved a suicidal woman who jumped into the Hudson; former US Secretary of States, Colin Powell, at the United Nations Headquarters in New York after he addressed a donors’ conference on Liberia; and Nobel Laureate Professor Wole Soyinka. That interview led to Soyinka's eventual exile after Nigeria's military rulers then in power declared him wanted for his pro-democracy views.

He has been featured as a guest on several international radio and TV programmes in the United States and Europe; including Air America Radio, BBC, CNN and the Laura Flanders show. Akande was the moderator of Global Information Network Roundtable on Africa in New York. He lived seventeen straight years in the United States and has travelled to several other countries in Europe and Africa on different journalism assignments, including the UNESCO General Conference in Paris, France.

Akande has also taught at several US colleges including Suffolk County Community College, where he was a Professor of Communication, and State University of New York, Stonybrook, where he lectured on African history and politics.

== Work at the United Nations ==
Akande worked as a Press Officer at the United Nations Headquarter, New York in 2002. He wrote press releases on the proceedings of UN main bodies including the General Assembly, and covered press briefings at the UN, as well as other assignments for the UN's Department of Public Information. He also worked as a media consultant for the enunciation and implementation of a Communications and Advocacy Campaign strategy for the New Partnership for Africa's Development, NEPAD. He is a contributor to African Recovery magazine, a UN publication, now called African Renewal.

== Work with the Nigerian Government ==
Akande was appointed by Nigeria's President Muhammadu Buhari as the Senior Special Assistant (Media and Publicity) to the President, deployed to the Vice President Yemi Osinbajo.

== Articles and publications ==
- It Takes a Village, the story of a family raising quadruplets in Queens—in Newsday Feb. 6, 2001
- Battering Walls of Legalization, about immigrant women battering—in Newsday Sept. 6, 2001
- Reviled ‘Virgin’ the new spirit of African art? ---in the Philadelphia Daily News, October 15, 1999, page 23.
- Reparations as Real Social Justice --- in The Philadelphia Inquirer, Feb 7, 1999 - A review of Nobel laureate Wole Soyinka's book The Burden of Memory in the Book review section
- He is currently writing the Biography of Professor J. F. Ade Ajayi.

== Awards ==
- Nominated in 1996, semifinal stage, for the Junior Fellowship of the Harvard University Society of Fellows.
- Won the Obafemi Awolowo University Department of English's Reporter of the Year Award.
- Won the Writer of the Year Award of the J.C. International at the University of Ibadan in 1989
- Was conferred with the National Honour of Commander of the Order of the Federal Republic by President Muhammadu Buhari
