= Tolu' A. Akinyemi =

Nigerian writer and poet

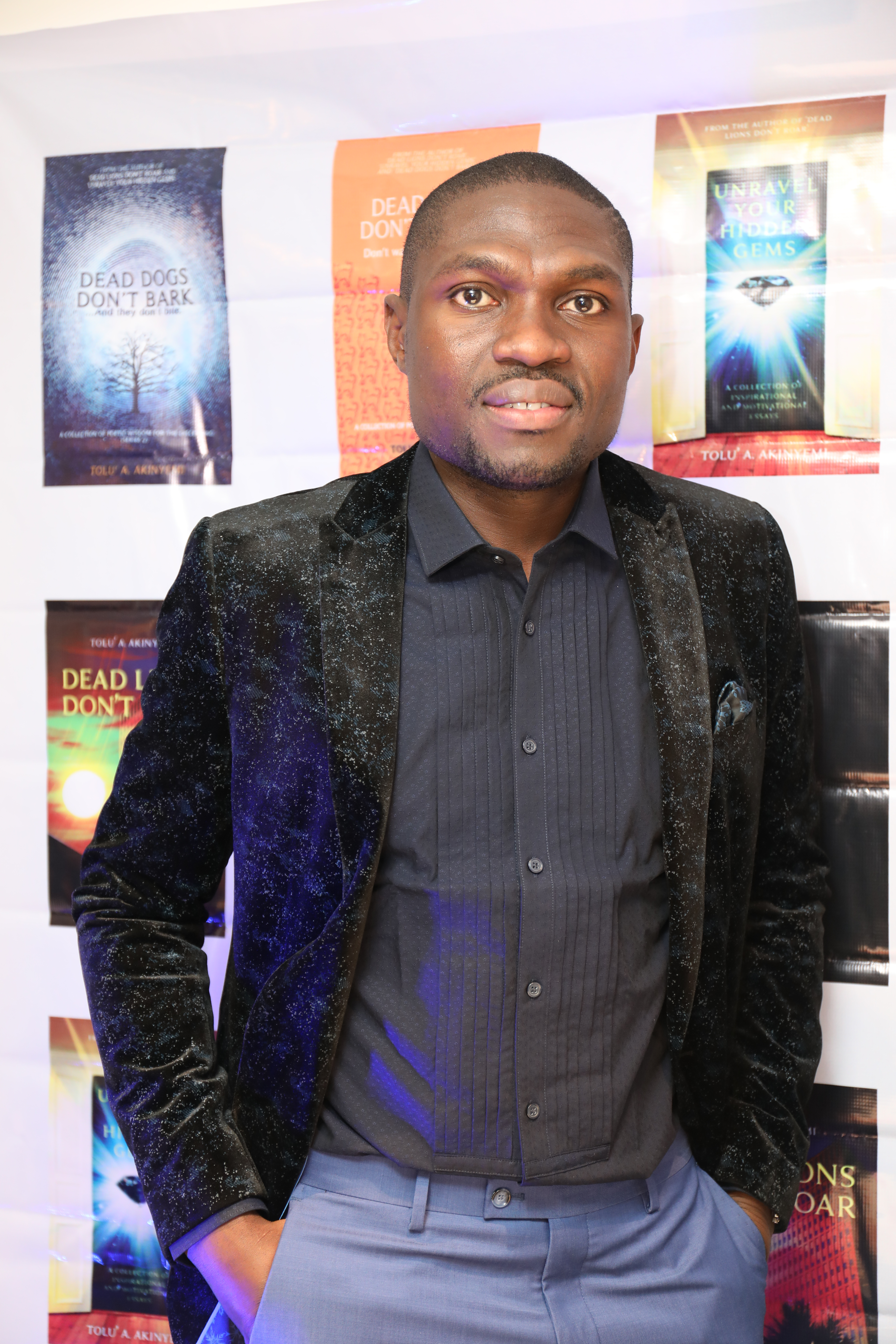
Tolu A. Akinyemi

Tolu A. Akinyemi is a Nigerian writer and poet best known for his poetry collection, Dead Lions Don't Roar.

== Early life and education ==
Akinyemi was born Tolulope Adeola Akinyemi in Ado-Ekiti. He has a degree in economics from Ekiti State University and a master's degree in accounting and financial management from the University of Hertfordshire, Hatfield, UK.

== Career ==
Akinyemi moved from Nigeria to the UK in 2010 and has since published twenty-one books. He released his debut book of poetry, Dead Lions Don't Roar, in 2017.

Akinyemi released Dead Dogs Don't Bark, his second book of poetry and third book in 2018. It was followed by Dead Cats Don't Meow, which was released in April 2019 and featured a book tour of the UK and Nigeria.

Akinyemi's books have been released both in print and online. His poems have been analysed as being "poetry of uplift" by the journal of English Studies in Africa.

Tolu’s poetry collection, Everybody Don Kolomental, has been used as a teaching resource to engage with medical students in discussions about mental health and well-being at the University of Benin/Teaching Hospital, Edo-State, Nigeria. His poem, Everybody don Kolomental, was read and analysed as a case study by Kingsley Oalei Akhigbe, Professor of Psychiatry, in the 293rd Inaugural Lecture Series at the University of Benin, on the topic, Kolomental and the Elephant in the Room - Our Mental Health.

Akinyemi is also a performance poet and has headlined at Great Northern Slam, Crossing The Tyne Festival, Feltonbury Arts and Music Festival, The Havering Literary Festival. He was the guest poet at Havering Libraries Black History Month event in October 2021 and has previously headlined at Woolwich Centre Library National Poetry Day event in October 2018; guest poet at The Stanza - an evening of poetry, spoken word, comedy, and live music on the Open Mic which held on 31 August 2023. He was also a guest poet at the Ndi Igbo North East England (NINEE) Black History Month.

On 25 October 2023, Lion & Lilac, a literary organisation which Akinyemi co-cofounded organised a poetry event in celebration of the Black History Month. Tolu was the headline performer.

In September 2023, Akinyemi kicked off his inaugural poetry tour across the Northeast of England, commencing at The Cooking Pot in Baba Yaga House, Whitley Bay. This was followed by a performance at Poetry Jam, hosted at the Waddington Street Centre in Durham.

He was endorsed as a writer with "exceptional talent" by the Arts Council England.

== Honours and awards ==
In 2020, he won the Best Indie Book Award for his poetry collection, A Booktiful Love. His collection of short stories, Inferno of Silence, won the 2021 IRDA Discovery Award for short stories and Next Generation Indie Book Awards (2021) for Best Cover Design (Fiction).

== Bibliography ==
Year	Title	Publisher	ISBN	Genre
August 2017	Dead Lions Don't Roar: A Collection of Poet Fic Wisdom For The Discerning	The Roaring Lion Newcastle	978-1-9998159-0-5	Poetry
April 2018	Unravel Your Hidden Gems	T & B Global Concepts Ltd	978-1-9998159-9-8	Nonfiction
September 2018	Dead Dogs Don't Bark	T & B Global Concepts Ltd	978-1-9998159-2-9	Poetry
April 2019	Dead Cats Don't Meow – Don't waste the ninth life	T & B Global Concepts Ltd	978-1-9998159-4-3	Poetry
August 2019	Never Play Games With the Devil	The Roaring Lion Newcastle	978-1-9998159-6-7	Poetry
May 7, 2020	Inferno of Silence	The Roaring Lion Newcastle	978-1-913636-02-9	Short stories
May 8, 2020	A Booktiful Love	The Roaring Lion Newcastle	978-1-913636-00-5	Poetry
January 1, 2021	Black # Inferior	The Roaring Lion Newcastle	978-1-913636-06-7	Poetry
January 1, 2021	Never Marry A Writer	The Roaring Lion Newcastle	978-1-913636-08-1	Poetry
April 1, 2021	Everybody Don Kolomental	The Roaring Lion Newcastle	978-1-913636-11-1	Poetry
June 1, 2021	I Wear Self-Confidence Like a Second Skin	The Roaring Lion Newcastle	978-1-913636-19-7	Children Literature
May 31, 2021	I am Not a Troublemaker	The Roaring Lion Newcastle	978-1-913636-15-9	Children Literature
September 7, 2021	Born in Lockdown	The Roaring Lion Newcastle	978-1-913636-28-9	Poetry
December 31, 2021	A god in a Human Body	The Roaring Lion Newcastle	978-1-913636-13-5	Poetry
July 29, 2022	If You Have To Be Anything, be Kind	The Roaring Lion Newcastle	978-1-913636-34-0	Children Literature
August 14, 2022	City of Lost Memories	The Roaring Lion Newcastle	978-1-913636-32-6	Poetry
September 8, 2022	Awaken Your Inner Lion	The Roaring Lion Newcastle	978-1-913636-36-4	Nonfiction
September 8, 2022	On The Train To Hell	The Roaring Lion Newcastle	978-1-913636-42-5	Poetry
January 1, 2023	You Need More Than Dreams	The Roaring Lion Newcastle	978-1-913636-30-2	Poetry
February 28, 2023	The Morning Cloud is Empty	The Roaring Lion Newcastle	978-1-913636-38-8	Poetry
June 22, 2023	Architects of a Cleaner Financial System	The Roaring Lion Newcastle	978-1-913636-44-9	Poetry
