= Gbemisola Adeoti =

Nigerian academic and poet

- Born: 1 May 1967 (age 59); Iseyin, Oyo state
- Citizenship: Nigeria
- Education: Obafemi Awolowo University
- Occupations: Actor; poet; scholar

Gbemisola Remi Adeoti is a Nigerian academic and poet. He is a professor of Literature in the English Department at Obafemi Awolowo University. He is the author of Naked Soles which was at a time recommended by the Joint Admission and Matriculation Board. Between 2011 and 2015, he served as the Director of the Institute of Cultural Studies, and he was the Dean of the Faculty of Arts from 2015 to 2019 at OAU.

== Background ==
Gbemisola Adeoti hails from Iseyin in Oke Ogun area of Oyo state. He had his primary and secondary education at St Mary's Catholic Primary School and Koso Community Grammar School both in Iseyin, from 1973 to 1983 where he graduated as the best student. He obtained his B. A. Dramatic Arts (1989) and M. A. Literature in English (1995) degrees from Obafemi Awolowo University, Ile Ife, Nigeria. He later bagged a PhD in English in 2003 with focus on Dramatic Literature from the University of Ibadan, Nigeria.

Gbemisola Adeoti was once a Reporter/Researcher with The News Magazine, Lagos, before joining the English Department of Obafemi Awolowo University, Ile Ife as a Graduate Assistant where he rose to become a professor in 2010. His areas of teaching and research include: Dramatic Literature, African literature, Shakespeare Studies, Literary History/Theory and Popular Culture.

== Academic Writings and Life ==
Adeoti has published widely in reputable local and international outlets. His works include Voices Offstage: Nigerian Dramatists on Drama and Politics, Aesthetics of Adaptation in Contemporary Nigerian Drama, Nigerian Video Film in Yoruba and Politics and the Urban Experience in Postcolonial West African Literature. His Inaugural lecture, presented in 2015 is entitled: Literature and the Art of Shaving A Man’s Head in His Absence.

Adeoti co-edited (with Bjorn Beckman) Intellectuals and African Development: Pretension and Resistance in African Politics and (with Femi Osofisan) Playwriting in Nigeria Today; the proceeding of the First Playwrights Conference in Nigeria in 2013. He is also the editor of African Literature and the Future and Inside African Forests: Critical Perspectives on the Novels of D. O. Fagunwa. He has also worked on two volumes of critical essays on Ahmed Yerima dramatic oeuvre - Muse and Mimesis: Critical Perspectives on Ahmed Yerima’s Drama (2007) and One Muse, Many Masks: Reflections on Ahmed Yerima’s Recent Drama(2021).

Adeoti was a British Academy Visiting Fellow at the Workshop Theatre, School of English, University of Leeds, United Kingdom in 2008 and a Postdoctoral Fellow of the African Humanities Program in residence at the International Institute for Advanced Studies of Culture, Institutions and Economic Enterprises (IIAS), Accra, Ghana from 2009 to 2010. In 2012, he was awarded the Presidential Fellowship of the African Studies Association (ASA), Philadelphia, in USA. He is currently an Advisor/Mentor for the African Humanities Program.

Adeoti is a member of professional associations such as the Association of Nigerian Authors (ANA), National Association of Nigerian Theatre Arts Practitioners (NANTAP), Society of Nigerian Theatre Artistes (SONTA), English Scholars Association of Nigeria (ESAN) and Nigerian Academy of Letters (NAL). He was the Director, Institute of Cultural Studies, Obafemi Awolowo University, Ile Ife, from 2011 to 2015 and Dean, Faculty of Arts from 2015 to 2019. He served as the Editor (and now General Editor) of Ife Studies in African Literature and the Arts (ISALA) and IFE: Journal of the Institute of Cultural Studies. He is a Reviewer and member of Editorial Advisory Boards of several local and foreign Journals. He has also attended academic conferences in many countries of Africa, Europe and America.

== Poetry and Creative Publications ==
Gbemisola Adeoti has published individual poems in local and international literary magazines and journals. To his critical acclaim, he published his first collection Naked Soles in 2005. Since the publication of the collection, poems have been selected from the works by national examination and regional examination boards. Between 2008 and 2020, his poems were on the reading lists for Literature in English in public examinations conducted by the Joint Admissions and Matriculation Board (JAMB), National Examination Council (NECO) and West African Examination Council (WAEC). Stoning the Wind is Adeoti's latest collection of poems.

== Drama & Film Career ==
Adeoti has appeared in different Nigerian video films. He played the role of warrior in Afonja, a film directed by Jare Adeniregun and Produced by Remdel Optimum Communication Limited, 2001. He was part of the detective team (Otelemuye) in Owo Eje, a film adaptation of Kola Owolabi's novel, Owo Eje - directed by Sunday O and produced by Remdel Optimum Communication Limited, 2003. He appeared as Adio in Ofin Ga, a film directed by Tunji Bamisigbin and produced by Remdel Optimum Communication Limited, 2008; Omuti (a drunk) in Oyawande, a film Directed by Muyideen Oladapo, 2013; University Administrator in Omo Campus, a film directed by Muyideen Oladapo, 2015; Chief Lisa in Lagbe, a film directed by Sunday Osibata and produced by High Dream Pictures, 2022.

== Awards ==
Adeoti has won numerous awards which include British Academy fellowship, African Humanities Program fellowship, and Presidential Fellow of the African Studies Association fellowship.

== Family and Life ==
Adeoti is married and blessed with children.
