= Professor Peller =

Nigerian magician

- Born: 1941
- Citizenship: Nigeria
- Occupations: Magician, Actor

Professor Moshood Abiola Peller (1941, in Iseyin – 2 August 1997, in Onipanu) was a Nigerian magician and one of Africa's most renowned magicians.

== Life ==
Born Folorunsho Abiola, Peller attended Moslem School, Iseyin and Native Authority Primary School, Iseyin. He started performing illusion tricks in 1954, travelling to Ibadan, Lagos and Oyo for performances. In 1959, he changed his occupation and began work as a representative of G.B.O. before moving into trading. His interest in illusions continued, and in 1964, he attended a school of magical arts in India. He spent 18 months at the school and after completion, settled in Liberia. In 1966, he had his first post-training show at the Federal Palace Hotel, Lagos. He was later assassinated in 1997.
