= Bayo Omoboriowo =

Nigerian photographer (born 1987)

- Born: May 13, 1987 (age 39)
- Education: University of Lagos
- Occupations: Photographer, Entrepreneur
- Spouse: Lola Omitokun (m. 2015)

Bayo Omoboriowo (born May 13, 1987) is a Nigerian documentary photographer and creative entrepreneur. He served as Official Photographer to former Nigerian president Muhammadu Buhari from 2015 to 2023. He is Chief Executive Officer of JT Agency and the founder of Tikera Africa. Omoboriowo holds the Guiness World Record for the largest photo book achieved in 2021 with his photographic book Discover Nigeria.

== Early life and education ==
Omoboriowo was raised in Mushin, Lagos where he was born on May 13, 1987. He graduated from the University of Lagos with a Bachelor of Science degree in Pure and Applied Chemistry. He later earned a Master's Degree in Arts and Cultural Management at the Department of Culture, Media and Creative Industries, King's College London.

== Career ==
=== Photography and the presidency ===
Omoboriowo worked as a photographer in Lagos, Nigeria before being appointed Official Photographer to President Muhammadu Buhari in May 2015, a position he held until the end of Buhari's presidency in May 2023. Buhari died in London in July 2025. In 2022, Omoboriowo's work featured in Intertwined: Fashion, Textile and Heritage in Nigeria, a photographic exhibition produced with researchers at King's College London.

=== Discover Nigeria ===
On 30 September 2021, President Buhari unveiled Discover Nigeria, a photographic book by Omoboriowo documenting the country's landscapes, people and cultural sites. Guinness World Records verified the volume at 60.84 square metres and recognised it as the largest photo book.

=== JT Agency ===
Omoboriowo is Chief Executive Officer of JT Agency, best known for developing Carnival of Stories in 2026, a cultural festival staged in Abuja, Nigeria with Omoboriowo serving as executive producer and lead curator.

=== Tikera Africa ===
Omoboriowo established MADhouse by Tikera, an incubator at the University of Lagos, and in August 2025 launched Tikera Africa, a platform supporting creative enterprises across Africa.

== Awards and honours ==
Omonoriowo won The Future Awards for the Most Creative Artist of the Year in 2012, and the MTN Afrinolly Film Competition in 2013. He has also been awarded the Sundance Institute Film Award.

In May 2023, Omoboriowo was appointed Member of the Order of the Federal Republic (MFR) in the Nigerian national honours list by President Muhammadu Buhari.

== Personal life ==
Omoboriowo married Lola Omitokun in 2015.
