= Sunday Igboho =

Yoruba Nation advocate

Chief Sunday Igboho
- Born: Sunday Adeniyi Adeyemo; 10 October 1972 (age 53); Igboho town, Oke Ogun, Oyo State, Nigeria
- Occupations: Politician, businessman, philanthropist

Sunday Adeniyi Adeyemo, popularly known as Sunday Igboho (born 10 October 1972) is a self-determination activist, known for his advocacy for an independent Yoruba Nation and also a philanthropist. Nicknamed after his hometown, he rose to fame following his role in the Modakeke-Ife communal crisis in 1997, where he played an active part.

He is the chairman of Adeson International Business Concept Ltd. His chieftaincy title, Akoni Oodua of Yorubaland, has become famous in recent years.

He gained social media attention in January 2021 when he gave an ultimatum to Fulani herdsmen in Ibarapa to vacate the land after the killing of Dr. Aborode and enforced same.

He is currently agitating for the freedom of the South West.

In October 2023, Sunday Igboho was released in Benin where he had been arrested after fleeing the police in Nigeria in 2021.

== Life and Yoruba Nation advocacy ==
Sunday was born in Igboho, an old Oyo town, of Oke ogun in Oyo State. His father relocated the family to Modakeke in Osun state, where he grew up. He started off as a motorcycle repairer and then ventured into automobiles where he sells cars and was able to start his current Adeson business.

He gained international attention after the part he played in the Modakeke/Ife war between 1997 and 1998, where he was a defendant of Modakeke people. And thereafter relocated to Ibadan where he met former Oyo state Governor, Lam Adesina through a courageous step while trying to defend the rights of the people at a fuel station. He also went on to work with former Governor, Rasheed Ladoja and became one of his most trusted aides.

As the Akoni Oodua of Yorubaland, he is known for fighting for the rights of the Yorubas and advocating for the Oduduwa republic.

On 12 October 2024, Igboho submitted a petition to UK prime minister Keir Starmer, urging him to consider the Yoruba Nation's bid for self-determination. The petition was filed on behalf of Yoruba leader Prof. Adebanji Akintoye, and Igboho was accompanied by key figures from the movement. This action aligned with the broader efforts to push for an independent Yoruba states.

== Personal life ==
Igboho is a Christian who is married with two wives and has children, including three professional footballers playing in Germany.
