= Kofo Akinkugbe =

Nigerian technology entrepreneur, founder and CEO of SecureID Nigeria Ltd

Kofo Akinkugbe OON
- Education: University of Lagos (BSc); Strathclyde Business School (MBA)
- Occupation: Technology entrepreneur
- Known for: Founder of SecureID Nigeria Ltd
- Title: CEO, SecureID Group
- Awards: OON (2022); Africa Awards for Entrepreneurship (2012)

Kofo Akinkugbe is a Nigerian technology entrepreneur. She is founder and CEO of SecureID, "Africa's leading manufacturer of smart cards and other identity documents".

== Education and early career ==
Kofo Akinkugbe studied mathematics at the University of Lagos, and following it, got her MBA degree from the University of Strathclyde in Scotland. After serving in the Nigerian Youth Service Corps, she worked in the banking industry for twelve years, starting with International Merchant Bank, a Nigerian affiliate of the First National Bank of Chicago, and later working for Chartered Bank. She then took up a Chevening Scholarship to study for an MBA at Strathclyde Business School.

== Companies ==
Kofo Akinkugbe founded Interface Technologies Limited, a security management and biometrics company, in 1998, SecureID Limited in 2005 and SecureCard Manufacturing in 2012. Her group of companies owns Nigeria's first SIM card production plant, in operation since December 2016. Certified by Visa, Verve and Mastercard, the company exports SIM cards to 21 other African countries.

== Recognition ==
In 2012, Kofo Akinkugbe won the Africa Awards for Entrepreneurship Mature Business Award. In May 2017 acting president Yemi Osinbajo appointed her to the board of the Nigerian Industrial Policy and Competitiveness Advisory Council.

In 2022, Akinkugbe was conferred with National award of Officer of the Order of the Niger (OON) by President Muhammadu Buhari.
