= Valley of Decision (disambiguation) =

The Valley of Decision is a biblical name given to the Valley of Jehoshaphat and the scene of Jehovah's signal inflictions on Zion's enemies.

Valley of Decision may also refer to:

- Valley of Decision (album), a 1996 album by Christafari
- The Valley of Decision (novel), a 1942 novel by Marcia Davenport
- The Valley of Decision, a 1945 film adaptation of the book
- The Valley of Decision (1916 film), starring Joan Bennett
- The Valley of Decision (1902 novel), by Edith Wharton
- Valley of Decision, a 1991 album by The Gladiators
