= Nailah Blackman =

Trinidadian singer-songwriter (born 1997)

- Born: Nailah Blackman; 2 December 1997 (age 28); Port-of-Spain, Trinidad and Tobago
- Occupations: Singer, songwriter
- Years active: 2013–present

Nailah Blackman (born 2 December 1997) is a Trinidadian soca singer and songwriter.

== Early life ==
At the age of five, Blackman began singing regularly and entered her first calypso competition two years later. Her professional career then began at the age of 11.

== Career ==
Blackman collaborated with soca band Kes on the song "Workout", which became a massive hit during the 2017 Trinidad carnival season and continues to enjoy lasting popularity. "Workout" took Blackman to the finals of the 2017 International Soca Monarch competition. Blackman also released "Baila Mami" in 2017, produced by Anson Pro Soverall.

In 2018, Blackman collaborated with Jamaican dancehall singer Shenseea on a song called "Badishh". During that year Blackman also earned a BET Award nomination in the category of "Best New International Act".

In August 2019, she released her debut EP The Reel which features the single "Sweet & Loco". Blackman's More Sokah was also the chosen tune of Desperadoes Steel Orchestra, winners of the 2020 Panorama title.

She eventually released her debut album, entitled Teknique, in 2022. In 2024 Blackman was honored with, a cultural ambassador award, from the University of Miami. In 2025, Billboard called her a "Caribbean Music Award-winning soca superstar."

== Personal life ==
Her grandfather, the late Garfield Blackman, also known as Lord Shorty or Ras Shorty I, invented the style of music known as 'jamoo' and is also credited with inventing soca as a means of reinvigorating calypso music. Her mother, Abbi Blackman, is a calypso star in her own right. Nailah is the niece of Avion Blackman, lead singer of the Los Angeles–based Christian-reggae band Christafari, and Nehilet Blackman-Gonowrie.
