= Greatest Lord =

Studio album by Sinach
- Released: April 2, 2021
- Recorded: 2019–2020
- Genre: Gospel music
- Length: 69:00
- Label: Integrity Music; SLIC

Sinach chronology
Acoustics – Volume 2 (2020)	Greatest Lord (2021)

Singles from Greatest Lord
- 1. "Greatest Lord" Released: February 12, 2021; 2. "Beautiful" Released: March 5, 2021; 3. "Love My Home" Released: March 5, 2021; 4. "We Prevail" Released: March 21, 2021; 5. "With My Hands" Released: March 27, 2021

Greatest Lord is the 12th studio album by Nigerian born worship leader Sinach. It was released on April 2, 2021 by Integrity Music. The album features collaborations with Darlene Zschech, Leeland, Maranda Curtis, Micah Stampley, Jekalyn Carr, Nathaniel Bassey, Da'Dra Greathouse, Panam Percy Paul; making it the first Gospel album from Africa to feature a high assemblage of American gospel singers, and also the first time Sinach has collaborated with each of these artists, except Leeland who featured on a version of her song, "Way Maker", alongside Maverick City and Mandisa at the Dove Award Way maker performance.

The album was officially launched with a live concert exclusive on YouTube which was held on Easter Monday, 5 April 2021. Since its release, Greatest Lord has claimed and retained the most streamed gospel album in Africa, making Sinach the 5th most streamed artist from Nigeria throughout April.

The album was supported with five singles: "Greatest Lord", "Beautiful", "We Prevail", "Love My Home" and "With My Hands". According to sources from Sinach's team, the Album has garnered more than 5 million streams since it was released.

== Tracklisting ==
No.	Title	Length
1.	"Greatest Lord"	5:10
2.	"Love My Home"	5:47
3.	"Beautiful"	4:57
4.	"We Prevail"	6:34
5.	"I Exalt You (featuring Leeland)"	4:52
6.	"Greatful"	4:32
7.	"King Of Glory (featuring Darlene Zschech)"	5:40
8.	"Peace In the Storm"	4:56
9.	"Your Name is Jesus (Panam Percy Paul)"	5:36
10.	"With My Hands"	5:50
11.	"I Bless"	5:16
12.	"I Live For You (featuring Da'Dra Greathouse)"	4:59
13.	"There's an Overflow (featuring Jekalyn Carr)"	5:11
Total length:		1:09:00
