= Rock of Ages Festival =

Christian music festival in Calistoga, Calif., US

- Phil Joel of the Newsboys performing at the Rock of Ages Festival on October 8th, 2011.
- Genre: Christian Music
- Dates: First weekend in October
- Location: Calistoga, California
- Coordinates: 38.5853°N 122.5867°W
- Years active: 1999-2015
- Founders: Ray Centanni, Kelland Ingram, Steve Frediani and Highlands Christian Fellowship.
- Website: Official website

The Rock of Ages Festival is a Christian music festival held every October in Calistoga, California, United States. It was established in 1999 and has grown to become one of Northern California's biggest rock festivals. The Rock of Ages Festival presents speakers and music on four stages ranging in style from rock, rap, and Reggae to punk, big band, Latino, and more. The festival also presents workshops on subjects from marriage and relationships, to creation science and local ministry.

The Rock of Ages Festival has alternative stages featuring sports shows including a skate park and pro skateboarders, BMX teams, motocross performers, sword swallowers, break dance teams, and more. In addition there is a Latino stage with Hispanic music and speakers, and a children's stage with entertainment, performances and interactive speakers featuring messages for families and kids.

The Rock of Ages Festival has many vendors featuring a multitude of wares, services and food, mission projects, opportunities to take foreign mission trips, and organizations that support sponsoring needy children of the world.

== 2008 lineup ==
- Jeremy Camp
- MXPX
- Thousand Foot Krutch
- The Cross Movement
- Skillet
- Safe Haven
- Quimi
- Disciple
- SF Gospel Choir
- Wavorly
- Salvador
- Jaci Velasquez

== 2009 lineup ==
- Third Day
- Martin Cantu & L-Rey
- Denver and the Mile High Orchestra
- Jeremy Camp
- Christafari
- L.G Wise
- Blood and Water
- Sphere of Fear
- Ron Luce
- SF Gospel Choir
- The Wedding
- Imisi
- Destination 7

== 2010 lineup ==
- Newsboys
- Audio Adrenaline
- Phil Joel
- Christafari
- The Waiting Ends
- Blood and Water
- Boarders for Christ
- Chasing Truth
- Miles McPherson
- Stellar Kart
- Lisa Daggs
- Bob Smiley

== 2011 lineup ==
- Jars of Clay
- Kutless
- Phil Joel
- Barlow Girl
- Curt Anderson
- Justin Homan
- Seventh Day Slumber
- Mark Thompson
- Blood & Water

== 2012 lineup ==
- Peter Furler
- Phil Joel
- Lincoln Brewster
- Christafari
- Jaci Velasquez
- Superchick
- Salvador
- Asante Choir
- Jesus Mendoza
- Levi the Poet
- Maximillian
- Tim Byrne

== 2013 lineup ==
- Kutless
- Tyler Reks
- StompTown Revival
- The Vespers
- Christafari
- Vic Murphy
- Avion Blackman
- Lancaster
- Asante Choir
- Brian Lugue
- Embassador Skate Team
- Bill Morgan
- Levi the Poet
- Maximillian
- Tim Byrne
- Reid Sanders
- KidStand
- Terrance Richman

== 2014 lineup ==
- Peter Furler

Steve Taylor & The Perfect Foil

- Rapture Ruckus
- [Christafari]
- [Phil Joel]
- The Red Roots
- [Stomp Town Revival]
- Avion Blackman
- Asante Choir
- Curtis Zackery
- * Vic Murphy
- Rabbi Eric Carlson
- Brad Butcher
- Whosoever South

== 2015 lineup ==
- NEEDTOBREATHE
- [Anthem Lights]
- [Lacey Sturm]
- [Shonlock]
- [Zealand Worship]
- [Andrew Palau]
- Marc Mero
- Georgina Verzal
- Jeff Gillman
- Jeff Devoll
- Dan Biddle
- Dave Bisbee
- xxxchurch
