= Way Maker =

Single by Sinach

from the album Way Maker (Live)
- Released: 30 May 2015
- Recorded: 2015
- Genre: Contemporary worship
- Songwriter: Sinach
- Producer: Mayo MuziQ

"Way Maker" is a contemporary worship song written by Nigerian gospel singer Sinach. It was released as a single on 30 December 2015. The song has been covered by a number of Christian music artists worldwide including charting hit versions by Michael W. Smith, Mandisa, Leeland and Passion.

In 2020, it received the Dove Award for Song of the Year.

== Release and reception ==
In November 2016, Sinach released an 18-track album, Waymaker – Live, titled after the single which recorded commercial success, and it was certified gold by Recording Industry of South Africa (RISA). Sinach was rated by Pulse Nigeria as the female artist of the decade, gospel female artist of the decade, and No. 7 artist of the decade in Nigeria.

Sinach became the first African artist to top the Billboard Christian Songwriters chart in May 2020. In June 2020, the song reached the top spot in the Christian Copyright Licensing International Top 100 songs, a ranking based on the frequency that it is used in church worship.

In October 2020, "Way Maker" won the Dove Award for Song of the Year at the 51st GMA Dove Awards in the United States. She was the first Nigerian gospel artist to win the award, and the first female songwriter to hold the number 1 spot in 2020.

In August 2021, the song won the BMI Song of the year, a first for an African Gospel song.

== Commercial performance ==
In October 2019, on invitation from Joel Osteen, Sinach visited Lakewood Church in Houston, Texas, where she performed the song live, making her the first female Nigerian to lead worship at the church. She also performed another single titled "I Know Who I Am".

== Music video ==
Sinach released the "Way Maker" music video on YouTube on 30 December 2015. The video shows her singing outdoors. It was directed by Ose Iria and audio produced by Mayolee. On 7 March 2019, the video reached 100 million views, making Sinach the first Nigerian gospel singer and third Nigerian singer overall to accomplish the feat. At the end of 2019, Rhythm 93.7 FM reported "Way Maker" as the second most viewed Nigerian music video on YouTube.

== Accolades ==
Awards
| Year | Organization | Award | Result | Ref |
|---|---|---|---|---|
| 2020 | GMA Dove Awards | Song of the Year | Won | |

== Impact ==
In 2020, video recordings of the song went viral on social media of people who gathered in their cars around a hospital in Albany, Georgia, singing and praying for those working in Phoebe Putney Medical system. Also, dozens of cars were parked outside Poinciana Medical Center in Kissimmee, Florida, where people gathered and sang the song.

"Way Maker" was also sung at the George Floyd protests in Milwaukee, Wisconsin, and Minneapolis, Minnesota.

== Covers and renditions ==
The song has been covered by a number of Christian music artists around the world including Michael W. Smith, Leeland, Christafari, and various artists in Bethel Music. It has been sung in churches around the world, and has been translated into 50 languages.

In November 2019, Christafari featuring Avion Blackman released a reggae rendition of "Way Maker".

In an interview with Billboard, Michael W. Smith said that he was inspired to do the cover after his daughter Anna talked about how it was her go-to song; he first performed it at his concert at the Bridgestone Arena in Nashville in August 2018. He was later asked to do a shorter radio version but it didn't turn out well so he went with the duet with his backing vocalist Vanessa Campagna. On 1 February 2020, Michael W. Smith released "Waymaker" featuring Campagna and Madelyn Berry. In March, the song marked Smith's first time in 16 years that he has reached a Billboard top 10 chart with a non-holiday single. Smith's rendition peaked at No. 3 on Hot Christian Songs, at No. 4 on Christian Airplay, and at No. 6 on Christian AC. In response to the Coronavirus pandemic in Italy and seeing Italian residents singing on the balconies, Campagna asked Smith to record an Italian version, which they released on 27 March as "Aprirai Una Via". Smith's rendition would later reach No. 1 on the Christian Airplay chart in May, as well as No. 2 on the Christian AC chart in June.

Leeland's rendition, "Way Maker (Live)", was originally released on 16 August 2019 as a music video and pre-order single from his upcoming album, Better Word. In an interview with Thir.st blog, singer Leeland Mooring said that his mother first came across Sinach's video on YouTube two years prior, and the year after they started singing the song at his home church and then other churches. Mooring said "It didn't matter what the demographics of the people were or what denomination the church was. Every time we sang "Waymaker", everyone would latch onto it too. It was something very special." Mooring said he almost had Sinach come and sing with them on the album, but she could not make it. The song entered the Billboard Hot Christian Songs 11 April 2020 chart at No. 9, marking the first time in the history of Hot Christian Songs that two versions of the same song have resided simultaneously in its top 10 (Smith's version at No. 3). Two other renditions of "Way Maker" also charted in that week: Mandisa at No. 38 and Passion (featuring Kristian Stanfill, Kari Jobe and Cody Carnes) at No. 39.

On 27 February 2020, worship leader Darlene Zschech recorded a rendition of "Way Maker" with William McDowell and a choir for an upcoming album for Integrity Music. Their video was posted in June.
