= Soulfire =

Soulfire may refer to:

- Soulfire (comics), a comic book
- Soulfire (Christafari album), 1995
- Soulfire (Tom Hingley album), 2000
- Soulfire (Little Steven album), 2017
- Soul-Fire, a 1925 silent drama
- Soul of the Fire, the fifth novel in the Sword of Truth series
