= Lord Tokyo =

- Born: Hayden Desiree; 20 June 1934; Loubiere, Dominica
- Died: 12 April 2015 (aged 80) New York, United States
- Genres: Calypso
- Occupation: Calypsonian
- Years active: 1960s–2015

Hayden Desiree (20 June 1934 – 12 April 2015), better known as Lord Tokyo (named after the capital city of Japan), (and sometimes as Doctor Tokes), was one of the most prominent Dominiquais calypsonians. He was the first solo artist to release a Dominiquais-produced record, won the island's Calypso King title, and wrote a winner of the Road March contest.

== Career ==
Born in Loubiere in 1934, Tokyo worked as a taxi driver before finding success as a calypsonian. He married Clemencia Desabaye on 26 May 1962.

Tokyo won Grandbay South Monarch crowns in 1965 and 1966, and in 1966 won the national Calypso Monarch title with "To Hell with the Judges" and "Dr. Tokes". He made history in 1967 when, shortly after the debut release by the Swingin' Stars Orchestra, he became the first solo artist on the island to release a locally made record with the single "De Man Doing de Pumpin'".

In 1969 he won the Calypso King of Dominica title, and the following year his composition "Tennis Shoe Scandal" won the Road March. In the early 1970s he began a collaboration with Trinidadian Lord Shorty and lyricist Chris Seraphine, combining calypso, cadence, and Creole patois to give the music a new flavour. Their partnership produced the hit "Ou Dee Moin Ou Petit Shorty", and their innovation led to the development of soca.

Tokyo spent much of his career in the US (where he also worked as a security guard), Canada, and the UK, recording his debut album in the latter in 1978. He became good friends with Mighty Sparrow and went on to work with Sparrow's band in the 1997, recording a new version of his Road March winner "Tennis Shoe Scandal", following it with the album Merry Christmas and a Happy New Year to All in 1998. De Pumping Man followed in 2000, featuring a guest appearance from Sparrow on the title track.

He died in New York on 12 April 2015, aged 80, after suffering a heart attack. He was survived by 11 children, 28 grandchildren and 11 great grandchildren.

== Discography ==
- Lord Tokyo Sings To The Nightengale: Calypso Harmonies (1978), Caribana
- Merry Christmas and a Happy New Year to All (1998)
- De Pumping Man (2000)
