= Sinach =

Nigerian gospel singer (born 1972)

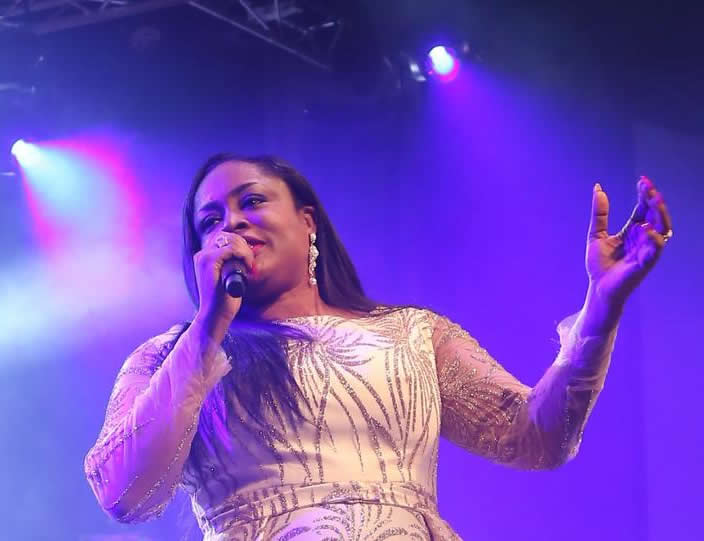
- Sinach performing at Mosaiek Theatre in Johannesburg 2016

Background information
- Born: Osinachi Kalu; 30 March 1972 (age 54)
- Origin: Edda LGA, Ebonyi State, Nigeria
- Genres: Gospel; worship
- Occupations: Singer; songwriter; worship leader
- Instrument: Vocals
- Years active: 1994–present
- Labels: Loveworld; SLIC
- Website: sinachmusic.com

Osinachi Kalu Okoro Egbu, known professionally as Sinach, (born 30 March 1972) is a Nigerian singer, songwriter and senior worship leader, serving in this capacity for over 30 years. She is the first singer-songwriter to top the Billboard Christian Songwriter chart for 12 weeks in a row. Her song "Way Maker" received three nominations and won the Song of the Year at the 51st GMA Dove Awards, making her the first Nigerian to win the Award. She also won the BMI song of the year, and in 2021 was recognized by the US Congress while on tour in the United States of America.

She has released 9 studio albums with several other hit songs, including "I Know Who I Am", "Great Are You Lord", "Rejoice", "He Did It Again", "Precious Jesus", "The Name of Jesus", "This Is My Season", "Awesome God", "For This", "I Stand Amazed", "Simply Devoted" and "Jesus is Alive".

"Way Maker" has also piled up recognition and many awards since it was released in 2015. The visuals for Way Maker is currently the second most watched Nigerian music video on YouTube. In March 2019, it became the third Nigerian video to have garnered 100 million views on YouTube behind Davido's "Fall" and Yemi Alade's "Johnny". "Way Maker" has been covered by over 60 Christian artists such as Michael W. Smith, Darlene Zschech, Leeland, Bethel Music, and Mandisa and in many languages. In the first few weeks of the Coronavirus pandemic and lockdown in 2020, Way Maker was the go to song, as several viral videos in hospitals, parks were made with large numbers of people singing the song. After being on the Christian Copyright Licensing International top 100 chart for several months in 2020, it claimed the No. 1 position in June and had remained so till December 2020, making it the most played song in churches across the United States for 2020.

Sinach received a Bethlehem Hall of Faith certificate of commemoration during her visit to Israel in December 2017. In September 2019, Sinach became the first gospel artist from Africa to tour India, headlining concerts with several thousands in attendance. In May 2020, she became the first African artist to top the Billboard Christian Songwriters chart. In July 2022, she joined the Grammy Recording Academy as a voting member.

In February 2023, the government of the Commonwealth of Dominica awarded Sinach as global ambassador, via a letter signed by the Prime Minister, Roosevelt Skerrit.

== Biography ==
=== Early life ===
Sinach hails from Ebonyi State, Eastern Nigeria, and is the second daughter of seven children.

Sinach started singing for family and friends in 1989 as a hobby, while working as a staff and choir member in Christ Embassy, Pastor Chris Oyakhilome's Church. She studied physics and graduated from the University of Port Harcourt, Rivers State, Nigeria.

=== Personal life ===
In 2014, Sinach married Joseph Egbu in her home Church Christ Embassy. On 17 November 2019, at the LIMA Awards Pastor Chris Oyakhilome, announced the arrival of Sinach's first child Rhoda.

== Musical career ==
As a child, Sinach stated she had dreams, where she saw herself singing to large crowds, but didn't actively pursue anything musically as a career besides joining the choir, and also working as an administrative staff in the Church. Sinach had written many songs before she released her first album, Chapter One in 2008. Her song 'This Is Your Season' won the Song of the Year award in 2008.

Speaking on how she came by her stage name Sinach, she said: "I chose that from my name Osinachi because it is easy to pronounce and catchy".

In 2016, Sinach was the first recipient of the LIMA Songwriter of the Decade Award, recognizing her contribution to gospel music in the previous decade. Her songs were being sung in many countries, translated to many languages, around the world. That same year, she received the African Achievers' Award for Global Excellence. Also that same year, for the second time in a row, she won the Western Africa Artist of the Year by Groove Awards in Kenya, and was listed by YNaija alongside Chris Oyakhilome, Enoch Adeboye as one of the Top 100 Influential Christians in Nigeria.

As a songwriter, Sinach has written over 200 songs and won several awards. Her song 'This Is Your Season' won the Song of the Year award in 2008. One of her most popular songs is 'I Know Who I Am'.

=== Performance ===
Sinach has performed and headlined concerts in over 50 countries including Kenya, Dominica, South Africa, United States, Canada, Antigua & Barbuda, Trinidad and Tobago, Jamaica, Grenada, Uganda, Barbados, The British Virgin Islands, Zambia, Saint Maarten, the United Kingdom and India.

Sinach also performed in her home country at The Experience hosted by the Senior Pastor of the Metropolitan House on the Rock churches, Pastor Paul Adefarasin, also she performed in annual Women on the Winning Edge Conference hosted by Funke Felix-Adejumo.

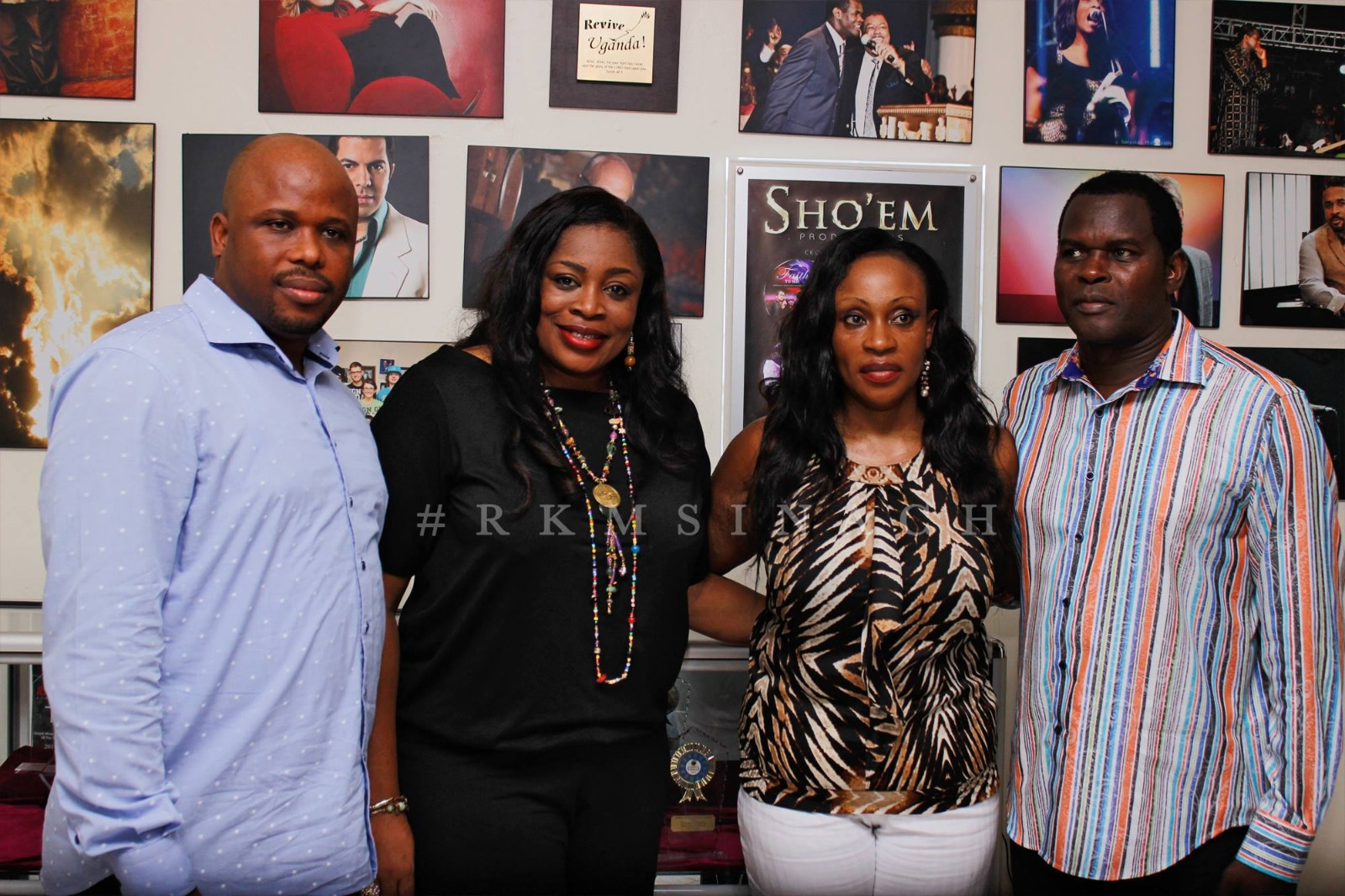
Sinach being welcomed in Uganda to perform on 15 April 2014

In one of the recent chats with music journalist Motolani Alake of Pulse Nigeria, Sinach reveals how God arrested her into gospel ministration through Pastor Chris Oyakhilome's anointing.

On 22 December 2020, at the third ceremony of African Entertainment Awards USA, she won the Best Gospel Artist award.

In 2022, she won the ABGMA International Artist of the Decade and Song of the Decade Awards.

In November 2024, she held and ministered coupled with other Nigerian Gospel Ministers like Moses Bliss, Tope Alabi, Mr M and Revelation at a Night of Worship in Abuja with thousands of worshippers in attendance.

== Philanthropy ==
Sinach and her husband launched the Joseph and Sinach Foundation which had its first medical outreach in Abia State, Nigeria in collaboration with Emzor Pharmaceuticals and the State Government. The initiative provided free healthcare to 700 persons.

== Albums ==
YEAR OF RELEASE	ALBUM	TYPE OF RECORDING
2007	Chapter One	Studio Album
2010	I'm Blessed	Studio Album
2011	From Glory to Glory	Live
2012	Shout it Loud	Live
2013	Sinach at Christmas	Studio Album
2014	The Name of Jesus	Live
2016	Way Maker	Single
2018	There's an Overflow	Live
2019	Great God – Live in London	Live
2020	Acoustics – Volume 1	Acoustics
2020	Acoustics – Volume 2	Acoustics
2021	Greatest Lord	Studio
2021	Live At Easter	Live
2023	Not Just A Story	Studio Album
2024	Victory Sounds	Live
2026	Enough For Me	Studio Album

== Awards and nominations ==
- 2016 LIMA Songwriter of the Decade Award
- 2016 Groove Awards Western Africa Artist of the Year
- 2016 African Achievers' Award for Global Excellence
- Top 100 Influential Christians in Nigeria.
- 2019 LIMA Song of the Year
- 2020 Dove Awards Song of the year
- 2022 ABGMA International Artist of the Decade and Song of the Decade Awards

== See also ==
- List of Igbo people
- List of Nigerian gospel musicians
- List of Nigerian musicians
- List of people from Ebonyi State
