= Kerron Ennis =

Jamaican gospel reggae singer

Kerron Ennis Scarlett (22 August 1982 – ) is a Jamaican gospel reggae singer.

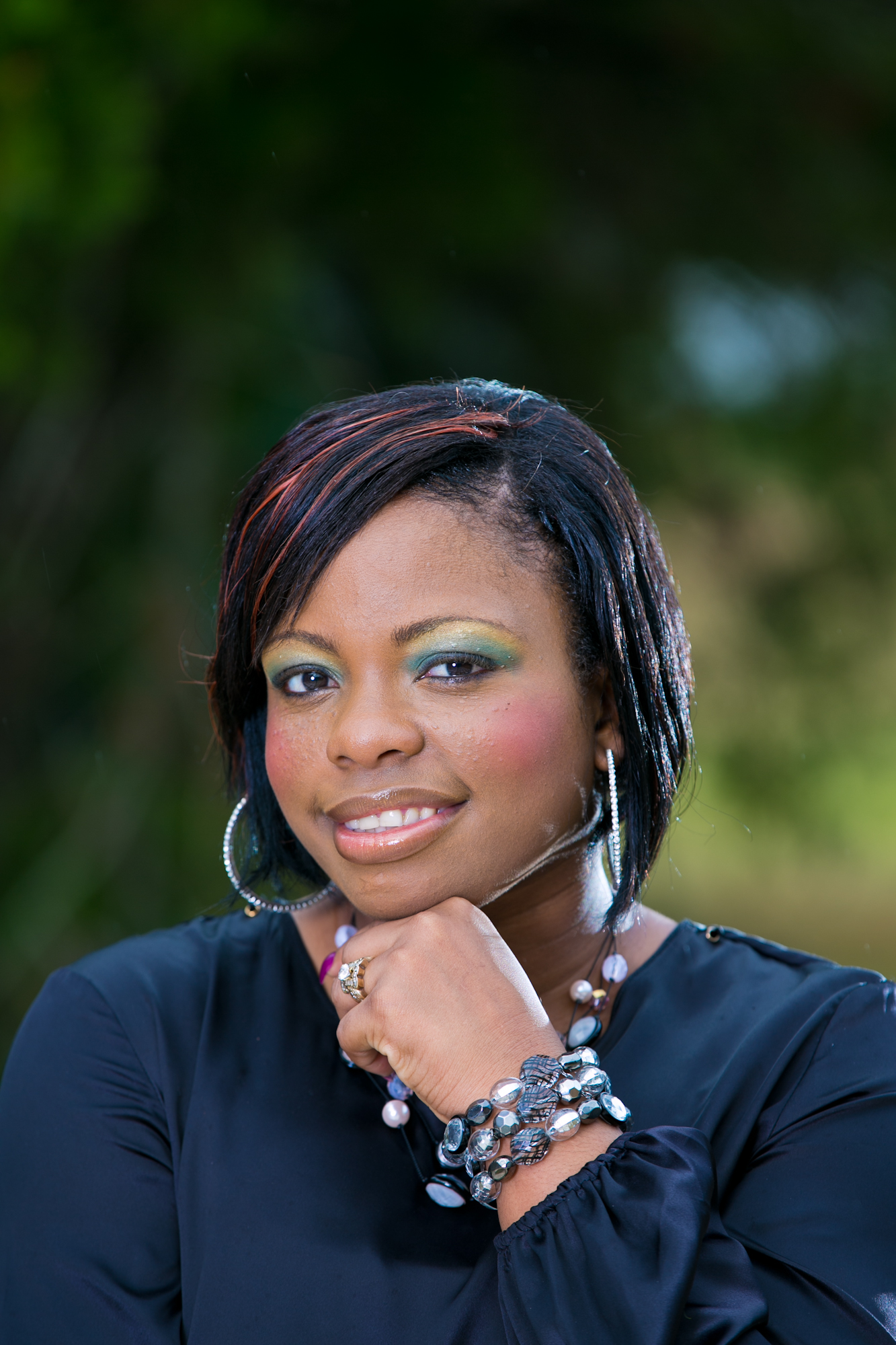
Gospel Recording Artist Kerron Ennis

== Early life ==
Kerron was born to Lascelle & Derica Ennis in Jamaica and grew up in the Patrick City Community. Her father introduced her to singers like Mahalia Jackson, Candi Staton and others while she was growing up. Kerron believes that it was after seeing the impact of singing when she was eight years old that she knew she had a calling to ministry.

== Career ==
At the age of 16 she became a choir director at the Boulevard Church of the Nazarene. In 2003 Kerron entered the JCDC Gospel Festival Competition where she placed third singing Clifton and Margaret Clarke's song No Wonder. Clifton Clarke produced her debut album titled "God Is By Our Side" (2005), which led to her being nominated for 6 awards at the 2006 Caribbean Gospel Music Marlin Awards. The track "Daddy Oh" (with DJ Nicholas) was a #1 song in Jamaica for three weeks. She won awards for "Reggae Recording of the year" for the title track "God is by our side" and Reggae vocal Performance of the year Duo/Group for the song "Holy Ghost Church" with Dj Nicholas. Kerron was a part of the Jamaican gospel group Perpetual Praise Team from 2003-2009.

In October 2007 Kerron received The Jamaica Observer Teenage Choice Awards for Gospel Artiste Of The Year

In 2012 she won a Video Web Award for best reggae gospel song of the year for "God Is Not Done With Me Yet", from her album I'm Alive (2013). The album was inspired by her experience surviving a serious car accident some years earlier.

In 2014 Female Recording Artist Kerron Ennis was top nominated female in the Marlin Awards. She received a whopping Ten (10) Marlin Award Nominations in the categories Adapted Calypso/Soca Recording of the Year (Many Are The Blessings), Album of the Year (I’M Alive), Contemporary Recording of the Year (Blessed), Contemporary Vocal Performance of the Year-Female (Blessed), Inspirational Recording of the Year (Trust You), Music Video of the Year-Female (Last Days), Praise & Worship Recording of the Year (All I Have), Reggae Vocal Performance of the Year-Female (Can’t Steal My Destiny), Rock Recording of the Year (Last Days) and Song of the Year (Last Days).

She was then awarded for the category Rock Recording of the Year for the song (Last Days)

== Family ==
In 2009 Ennis married Andrew Scarlett, who co-wrote and has produced some of her music. The couple met in 2006 at her debut album launch in Jamaica.

== Music videos ==
- "God is Not Done With Me Yet" (2012)
- "Last Days" (2014)

== Discography ==
- DJ Nicholas, "On The Shout" (2005)
- "God Is By Our Side"(2006)
- Katalys Crew, "Christmas Inna Jamdown"
- Various Artist, YOW 5- REggae Street Gospel Chapter 5
- Goddy Goddy, "Next Dimension"
- IM ALIVE (2013)

== Awards ==
Kerron Ennis
Year	Award	Category	Results
2003	JCDC Gospel Festival	2nd Runner Up	Won
2006	Marlin Awards	Reggae Recording of the Year	Won
2006	Marlin Awards	Reggae vocal Performance of the year Duo/Group	Won
2007	Teen Jamaica Observer Awards	Gospel Artist of the Year	Won
2012	Carib Vibez Video Web Awards	Music Video Of the Year	Won
2014	Marlin Awards	Rock Recording of the Year	Won
