= Valley of Josaphat =

Valley mentioned in the Bible

Coordinates: 31°46′49″N 35°14′24″E

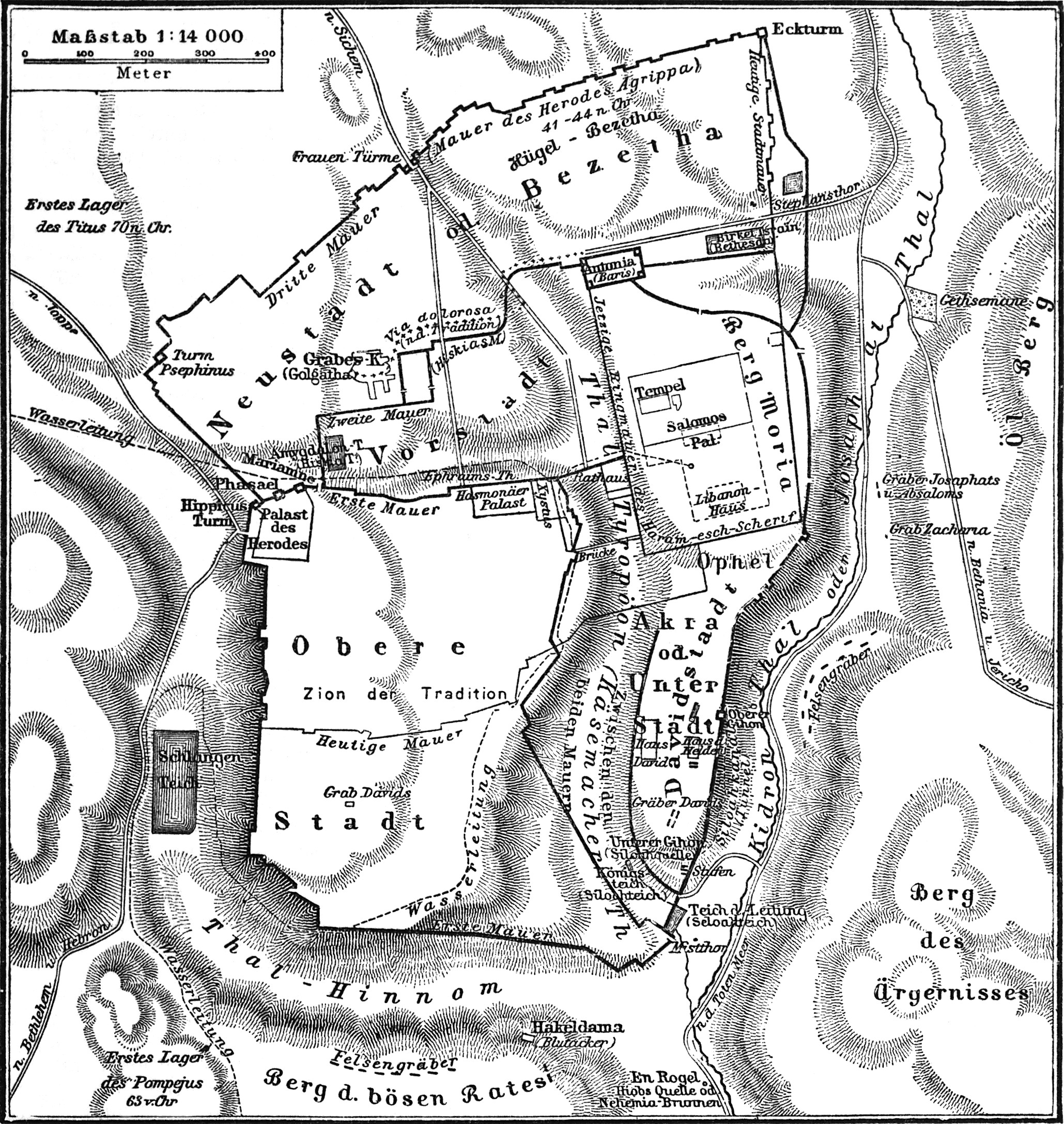
In this historic map of biblical Jerusalem, the Cedron valley (German Kidron Thal oder Josaphat Thal – Kidron Valley or Josaphat Valley) runs along the eastern wall of the city (Meyers Konversationslexikon, 1885).

The Valley of Josaphat (Hebrew: עמק יהושפט, romanized: ‘Êmeq Yəhōšāp̄āṭ; variants: Valley of Jehoshaphat and Valley of Yehoshephat) is a Biblical place mentioned by name in the Book of Joel (Joel 3:2 and 3:12): "I will gather together all nations, and will bring them down into the valley of Josaphat: "Then I will enter into judgment with them there", on behalf of my people and for My inheritance Israel, whom they have scattered among the nations and they have divided up My land."; "Let the nations be roused; Let the nations be aroused And come up to the Valley of Jehoshaphat, for there I will sit to judge all the nations on every side". This location is also referred to as the Valley of Decision.

== Identification ==
=== In the Judaean Desert near Teqo'a ===
By one interpretation, this describes the place where, in the presence of Jehoshaphat (Josaphat), King of Judah, Yahweh will annihilate the Gentile coalition of Moab, Ammon and Edom. This may indicate an actual valley euphemistically called by the Jews êmêq Berâkâh ("valley of blessing"), situated in the Judaean Desert, in the proximity of Teqo'a near Khirbet Berêkût, west of Khirbet Teqû'a (about eleven miles from Jerusalem).

=== Upper Kidron Valley segment ===
In the fourth century, in the Bordeaux itinerary, the Cedron takes the name of Valley of Josaphat. Eusebius (in his Onomasticon) and St. Jerome strengthen this view, while Cyril of Alexandria appears to indicate a different place; early Jewish tradition denied the reality of this valley. Subsequently to the fourth century, Christians, Jews and Muslims regard Cedron as the place of the Last Judgment. What has lent colour to this popular belief is the fact that since the time of the kings of Judah, Cedron has been the principal necropolis of Jerusalem. Josias scattered upon the tombs of the children of Israel the ashes of the idol of the goddess Astarte which he burned in Cedron (2 Kings 23:4).

The Valley of Jehoshaphat is applied to the Kidron Valley, between Jerusalem and the Mount of Olives, for the first time by the Pilgrim of Bordeaux in 333.

=== Symbolic, indeterminate place ===
Alternatively, it may refer to an indeterminate valley of judgment, since "Josaphat" means "Yahweh judges". In Joel 3:14 the same valley is called the "valley of decision" (or in the Douay–Rheims Bible "valley of destruction"). The chapter in question describes how the nations that afflicted Judah and Jerusalem during their Babylonian captivity and return from exile shall receive Divine judgment.

=== No place ===
According to the Midrash Tehillim, no "valley called Jehoshaphat" exists.

== Gallery ==
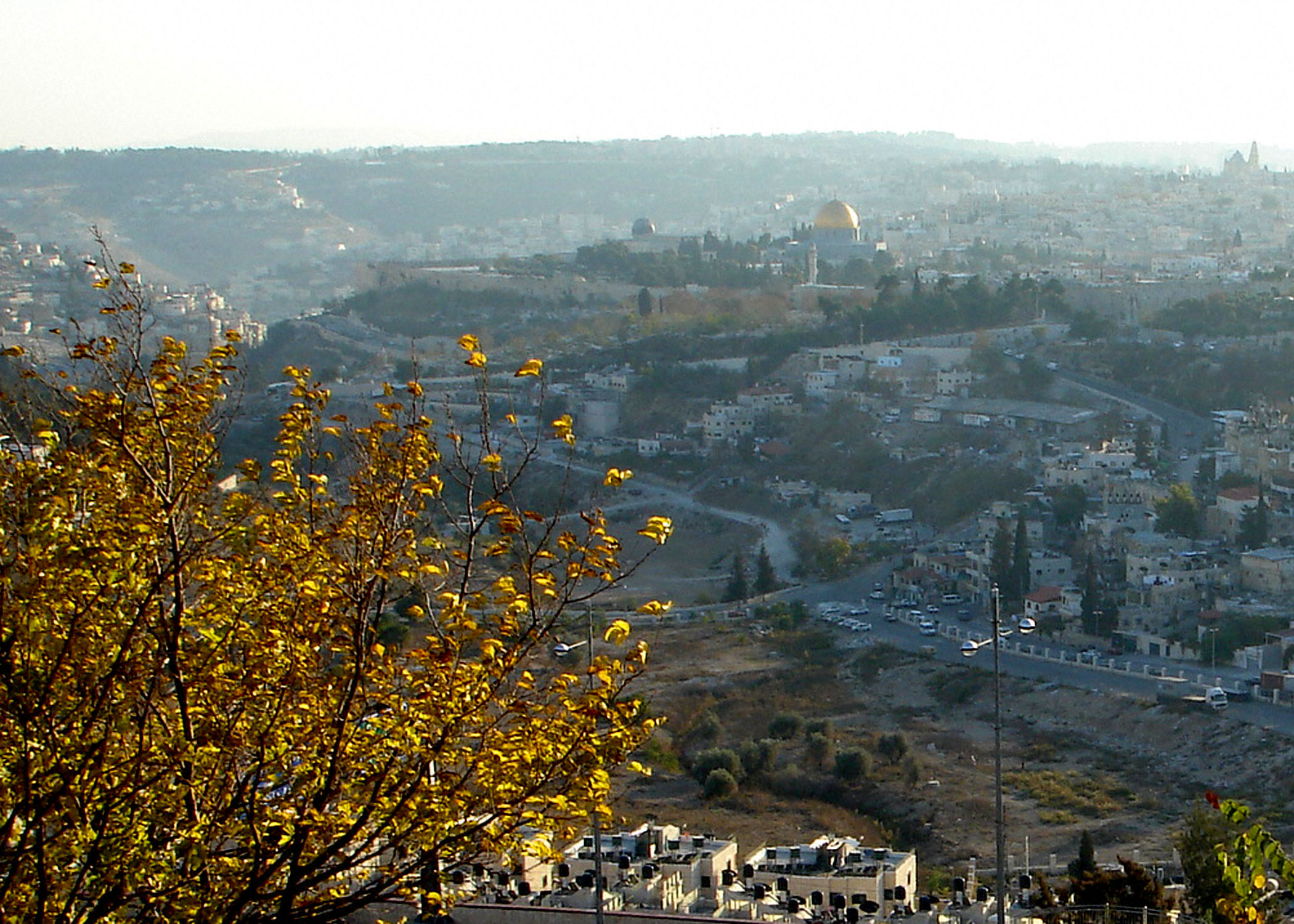
Old City of Jerusalem from Mount Scopus. This view is looking southwest across the Kidron Valley.

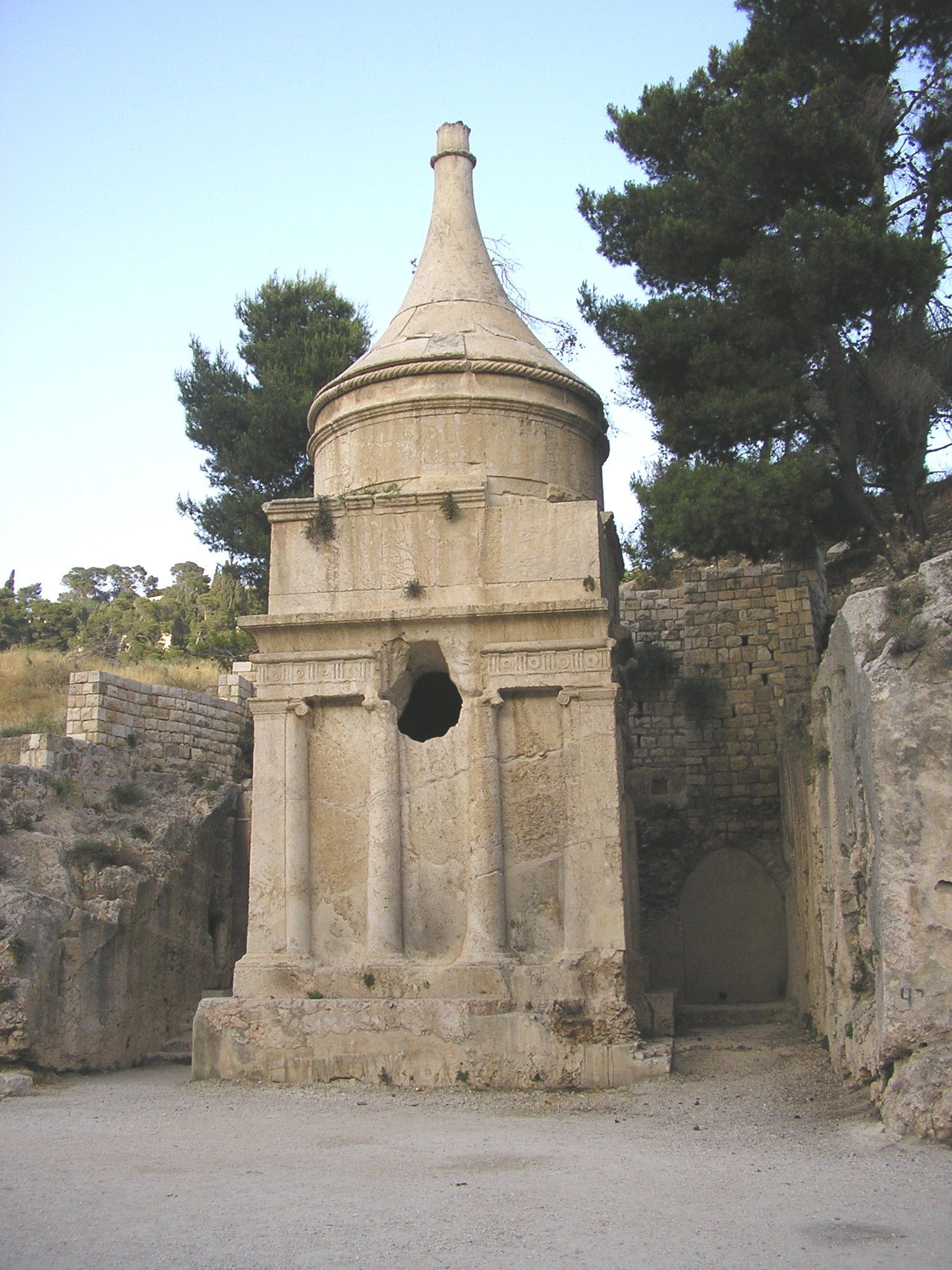
Tomb of Absalom.

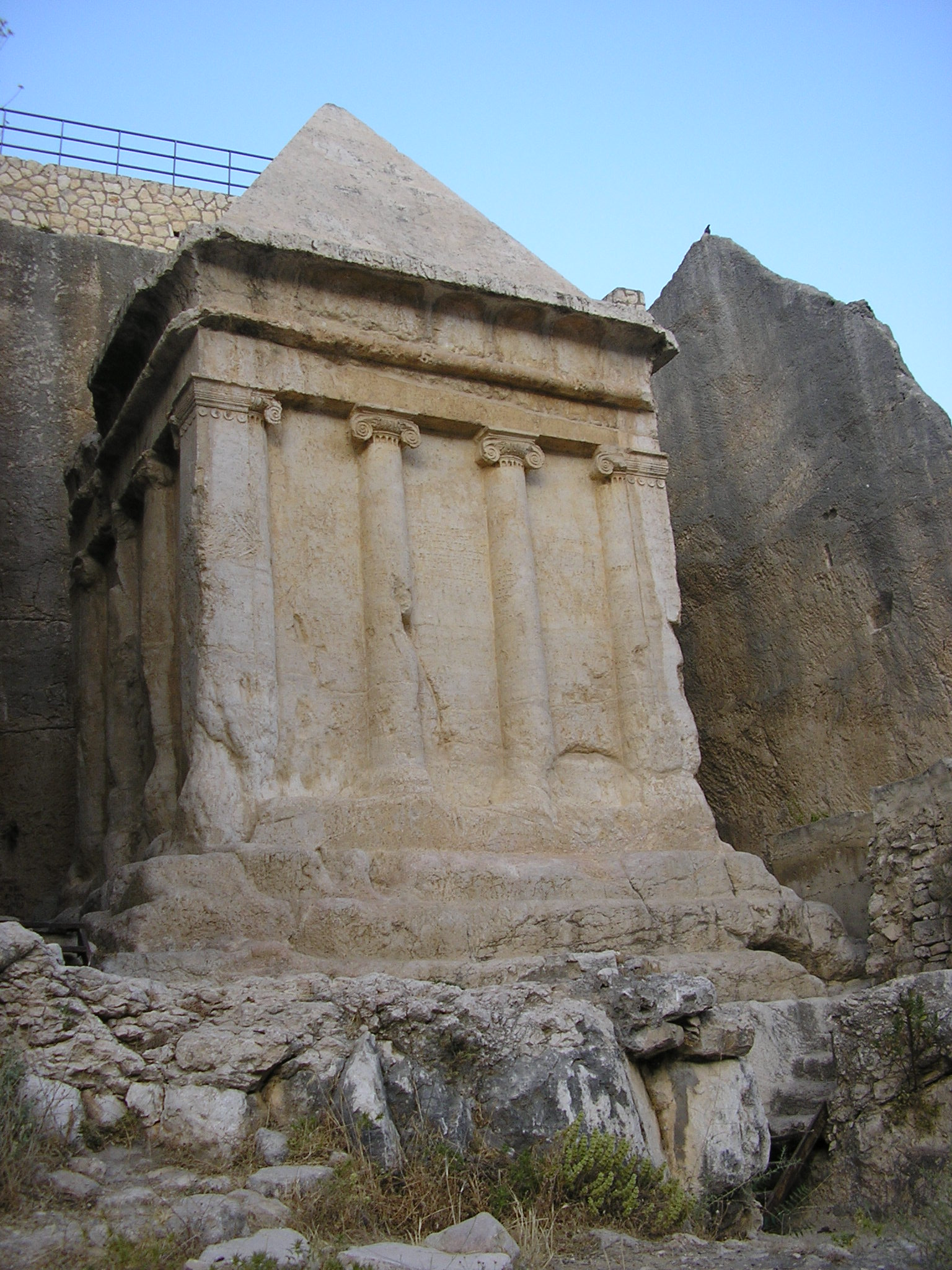
Tomb of Zechariah.

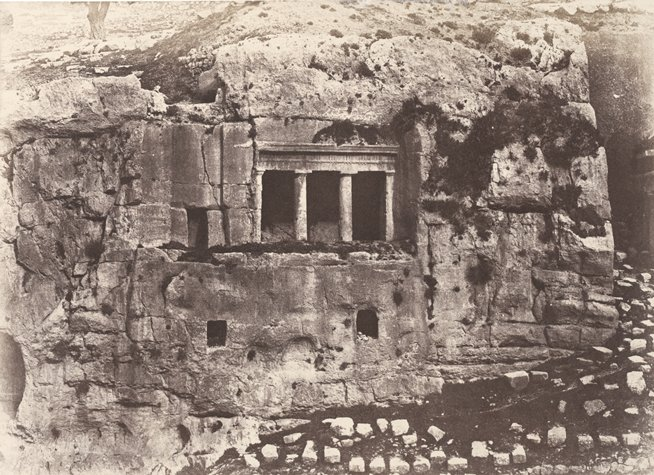
"Tomb of St. James", actually of the Hezir priestly family, photo by Auguste Salzmann
