= Sanchez (singer) =

Jamaican reggae singer(born 30 November 1964)

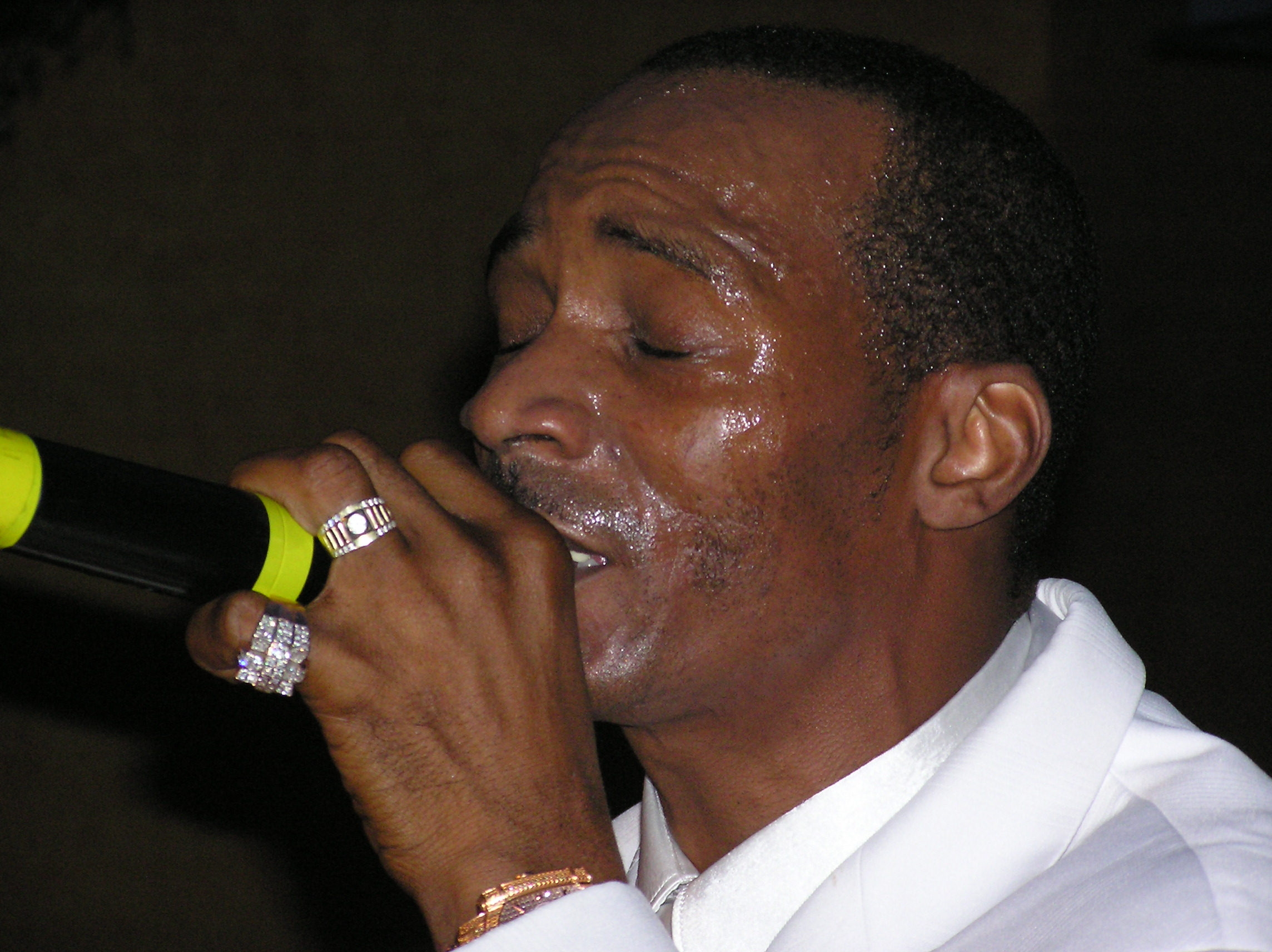

Background information
- Born: Kevin Anthony Jackson; 30 November 1964 (age 61); Kingston, Jamaica
- Genres: Reggae, dancehall, lovers rock, gospel reggae
- Occupations: Singer-songwriter, record producer
- Instrument: Vocals
- Years active: 1987–present
- Labels: Dennis Star; Vena; Techniques; Greensleeves; RAS; Jet Star; VP; Exterminator; World; Artists Only!; John John; VPAL
- Website: www.instagram.com/iconicsanchez

Kevin Anthony Jackson (born 30 November 1964), also known by his stage name Sanchez, is a Jamaican reggae and lovers rock singer known for his smooth, golden voice, gospel roots, and ability to turn R&B and pop ballads into timeless reggae anthems. Gained prominence in the late 1980s with breakout hits like "Lady in Red" (1987), "Loneliness," "Frenzy," "Here I Am," and "Never Dis Di Man".

== Biography ==
Born in Kingston, Jackson grew up in the Stony Hill and Waterford areas. He was given the nickname 'Sanchez' due to his skills – a reference to a footballer of that name. He sang from an early age in the Rehoboth Apostolic Church choir in St Catherine. After working with several Kingston sound systems, first as selector for the Rambo Mango sound system, he began recording and had his first hit with "Lady In Red", recorded for producer Red Man in 1987. By 1988 he was one of Jamaica's most popular singers, and at his performance at Reggae Sunsplash that year he was called back for six encores. He had further hits with "Loneliness Leave Me Alone", produced by Winston Riley, and with his version of Tracy Chapman's "Baby Can I Hold You", which was included on the Philip "Fatis" Burrell-produced Number One album (1989). He has worked with several of Jamaica's other top producers, including King Jammy, Bobby Digital, and Donovan Germain.

His 2000 album Simply Being Me reached number 14 on the US Billboard Top Reggae Albums chart, and 2002's Stays on My Mind hit number 9.

Primarily known for love songs and cover versions of pop and R&B songs, in the 1990s he mixed gospel themes with other topics on his albums, and released the totally gospel Who is This Man in 1999 and He's Got the Power in 2003.

In 2012 he revealed that he is now "a full-time producer", and has been working with studio engineer and writer Rodnie "Tenor" Lion. In May he revealed that he was working on two self-produced albums, one dancehall (Like a General) and one gospel (There is no Other Like You Lord).

== Discography ==
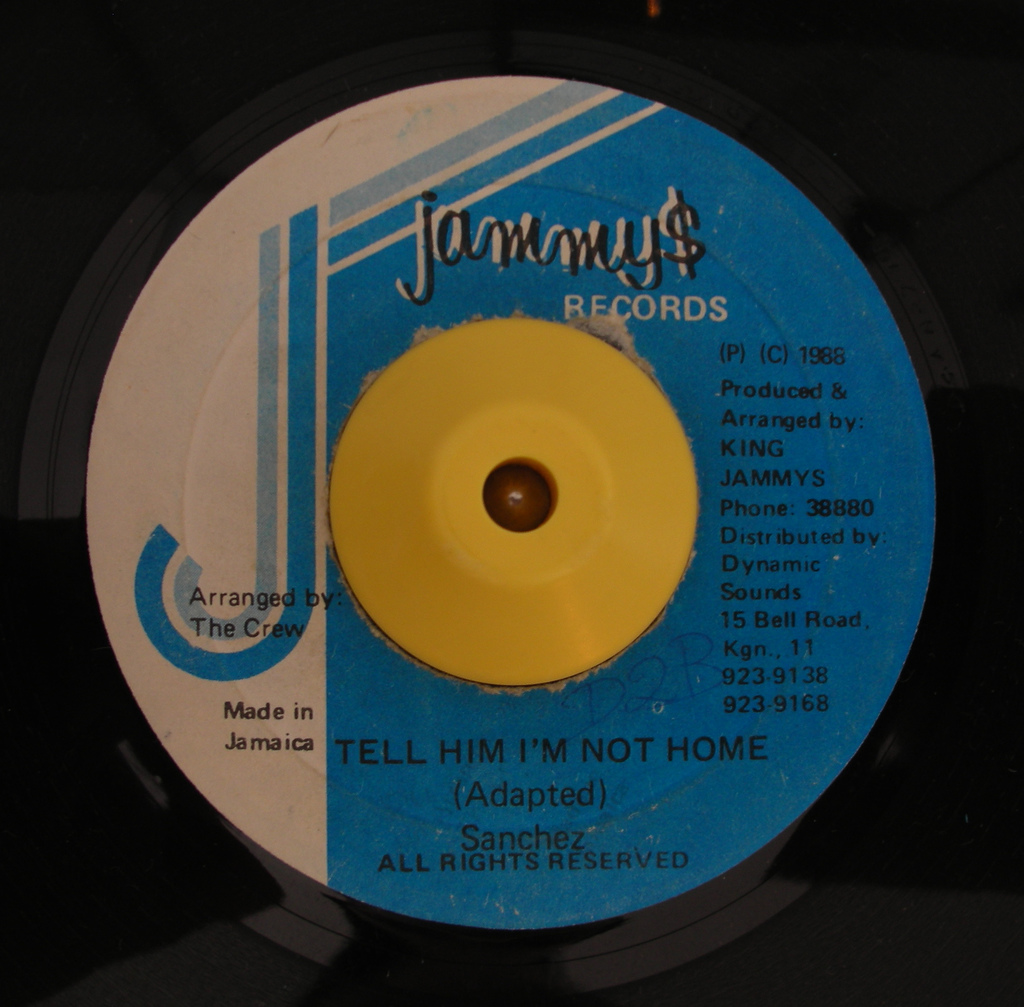
Gramophone record of "Tell Him I'm Not Home" by Sanchez, 1988.

=== Albums ===
Album name	Year	Label
The Sweetest Girl	1988	Dennis Star; Rohit
Sanchez	1988	Vena
Loneliness	1988	Techniques
Wild Sanchez (Wicked & Wild Sanchez)	1988	Dennis Star; Greensleeves; VP
Number One	1989	RAS; Island, Sanctuary, Universal
Falling In Love	1989	Dennis Star
Number One Dub	1990	ROIR
In Fine Style	1990	VP
I Can't Wait	1991	VP
The One For Me	1992	VP
Bring Back The Love	1992	VP
Tell It Like It Is	1992	VP
Boom Boom Bye Bye	1993	Greensleeves
Just Sanchez	1993	Overheat
Tell It Like It Is	1993	VP
Can We Talk	1994	VP
Missing You	1994	VP
Only You	1994	Luddy's
Brown Eye Girl	1994	VP
Here I Am	1995	VP
Forever	1995	Exterminator
The Golden Voice of Reggae	1997	World
Perilous Time	1999	Artists Only!
Who Is This Man	1999	VP
True Identity	1999	VP
Simply Being Me	2000	VP
Songs From The Heart	2000	Artists Only!
Stays on My Mind	2002	VP
No More Heartaches	2003	VP
He's Got The Power	2003	VP
Now & Forever	2009	VP
Love You More	2011	VP
Giving Praises Live	2013	Jasfar
Beware	2016	John John
Jamdown	2025	VPAL

=== Split albums ===
- Pinchers Meets Sanchez (with Pinchers) (1989), Exterminator
- Wayne Wonder & Sanchez Part 1 (with Wayne Wonder) (1989), Penthouse
- Wayne Wonder & Sanchez Part 2 (with Wayne Wonder) (1990), Penthouse
- Sanchez Meets Cocoa Tea (with Cocoa Tea) (1993), Sonic Sounds
- Thriller U & Sanchez (with Thriller U) (1996), Record Factory
- Toe 2 Toe Vol. 7 (with Ghost) (2003), Jet Star

=== Compilations albums ===
- Sanchez Vol. 1 (1994), Penthouse
- Sanchez Vol. 2 (1994), Penthouse
- One in a Million: The Best of Sanchez (1997), VP
- Reggae Max (2000), Jet Star
- The Best of Sanchez: Back at One (2001), VP
- Reggae Legends: Sanchez (2009), VP
