= Dub Sound & Power =

Dubsound & Power

Remix album by Christafari
- Released: 2000
- Studio: The Junction Studio, Madison, TN
- Label: Lion of Zion Entertainment
- Producer: Mark Mohr

Christafari chronology
Reggae Worship: First Fruits (2000)	Dubsound & Power (2000)	Palabra Sonido Y Poder (2000)

Professional ratings
Review scores
Source	Rating
AllMusic	3/5 stars

Dubsound & Power is a 2000 album by Christafari. It contains instrumental mixes of songs from his WordSound&Power album.

== Track listing ==
All tracks by Mark Mohr except where noted:

1. "Dub Inna de Night" – 5:45
2. "Dub of My Life" (Derrick Jefferson, Mohr) – 5:43
3. "Babylon Has Fallen" (Mohr, Wayne Swiderski) – 2:54
4. "Dubbing on the Frontline" (Jefferson, Kevin Kelleher, Mohr, Scott Whelan) – 7:13
5. "Lift Him Up and Dub It Up Daily" (Case, Max Fulwider, Jefferson, Mohr, Whelan) – 5:22
6. "Render Your Dub" (Case, Jim Kleinman, Mohr) – 4:06
7. "Why You Ago Look?" [A Cappella] (Jefferson, Kevin Kelleher, Mohr, Whelan) – 1:51
8. "Selassie Say II" (Interlude) – 0:42
9. "Why You Ago Dub?" – 3:41
10. "Emancipation Dub-the-Nation" – 5:17
11. "My Other Radio" (Interlude) – 0:50
12. "The Dub's So Nice – 5:04
13. "Dub and Fire" (Jefferson, Mohr) – 5:22
14. "Thief Inna de Night" [A Cappella] (Interlude) – 0:20
15. "Everyday Dubbing" – 4:34
16. "How You Fe Dub Me?" – 5:02
17. "As the Dub Goes By" – 4:18
18. "Dub Sound and Power" – 5:12

== Personnel ==
- Lead Vocals – Mark Mohr
- Additional Vocals – Ace Winn, Bernard Schroter, Geneman & Othniel Lewis
- Background Vocals – Mark Mohr, Vanessa Mohr, Bernard Schroter, Diedrich Jones, Lyndon Allen, Scott Wehlen, Viki Hampton, Ace Winn
- Drums – Kevin Kelleher
- Bass – Anthony Case, Jim Kleinman
- Guitar – Anthony Case, Chris Howell, Jim Kleinman, Rick Strickland
- Piano & Synth & Organ – Scott Wehlen, Othniel Lewis
- Saxophone – Max Elliott Fulwider
- Trombone – Barry Greene & Chris McDonald
- Trumpet – Jeff Bailey & Denver Bierman
- Percussion – Mark Mohr, Kevin Kelleher
- Niyabinghi Drums – Mark Mohr, Kevin Kelleher, Scott Wehlen, Diedrich Jones
- Acoustic Guitar – Mike Severs, Jim Kleinman
- Crowd & Shouting Vocals – Mark Mohr, Kevin Kelleher, Scott Wehlen, Diedrich Jones, Troy Buchanan III, Othniel Lewis
