= StompTown Revival =

US Christian music duo

- Also known as: STR
- Origin: Nashville, Tennessee
- Genres: Worship; Gospel; rock; folk; blues; soul; country; pop; alternative rock; americana; Christian pop; Christian rock; Christian country; Christian alternative rock; indie folk; indie rock; indie pop; roots rock; southern gospel; southern rock; southern soul
- Years active: 2012–present
- Label: Save the City
- Members: Brandon Bee; Gabe Martinez
- Website: stomptownrevival.com

StompTown Revival, also known as STR, are an American Christian music duo from Nashville, Tennessee, and they started making music together in 2012. The first extended play, StompTown Revival, was released in 2012 by Save the City Music. This EP charted on two Billboard magazine charts.

== Background ==
The duo are music producer Brandon Bee a Seattle-native, and the frontman from Circleslide and a San Antonio-native, Gabe Martinez. Bee performs vocals, guitar, the slide guitar, stompbox, keys, and bass guitar, while Martinez plays the vocals, guitar, and harmonica.

== Music history ==
They released their first musical project, an extended play, StompTown Revival, on October 2, 2012, with Save the City Records. This EP charted on two Billboard magazine charts, while it placed on the Christian Albums and Heatseekers Albums charts, where it peaked at Nos. 48 and 47, correspondingly. The duo played at the 2013 Rock of Ages Festival.

== Members ==
- Brandon Bee – vocals, guitar, slide Guitar, stompbox, keys, bass
- Gabe Martinez – vocals, guitar, harmonica

== Discography ==
List of selected musical works, with selected chart positions
Title	Album details	Peak chart positions	
Title	Album details	US Chr	US Heat
StompTown Revival EP	Released: October 2, 2012; Label: Save the City; CD, digital download	48	47
