= Lieutenant Stitchie =

Jamaican musical artist (1965–2026)

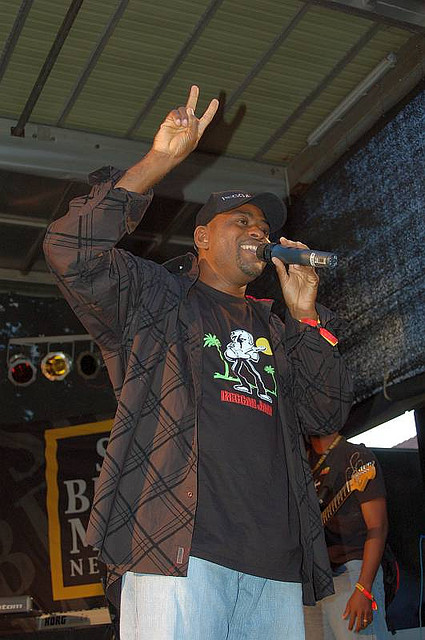
- Performing live in 2007

Background information
- Also known as: Stitchie
- Born: Cleveland Laing; 29 September 1965; Spanish Town, Jamaica
- Died: 28 September 2026 (aged 60) Kingston, Jamaica
- Genres: Dancehall; gospel reggae
- Instrument: Vocals
- Years active: Late 1970s–2026
- Labels: Jammy's; Atlantic; VP; Drum & Bass

Cleveland Laing (29 September 1965 – 28 September 2026), better known as Lieutenant Stitchie, was a Jamaican deejay who originally worked in the dancehall style but switched to gospel reggae in 1997 after surviving a car crash, thereafter working under the shorter name Stitchie.

== Life and career ==
=== Early life and dancehall career ===
Laing was born in Spanish Town on 29 September 1965. He worked as a biology teacher at Spanish Town School before embarking on a career in music, for a time pursuing both. In the late 1970s he began his career as a singer. In the mid-1980s he began working on sound systems such as the Django sound system (as DJ Ranking Noseworthy), and released his first single under the name Ranking Citrus, or Citchie for short, being known for his love of citrus fruits. He went on to work on the Stereo One sound system, where he adopted the stage name Stitchie after being credited as such via a misprinted record label. In 1986 he began working with Prince Jammy, recording the single "Wear Yuh Size", followed in 1987 with his debut album Great Ambition. His style was humorous, often adopting the voices of several different characters during a song. His single "Natty Dread" topped the Jamaican charts for 14 weeks. Commercial success led to a record deal with Atlantic Records in 1988, Stitchie becoming one of the first dancehall artists, four years after Yellowman, to sign a deal with a major record label, releasing the albums The Governor, Wild Jamaican Romances, and Rude Boy. He lost some of his dancehall following so returned to Kingston studios, recording hit records for producers such as Danny Browne, Donovan Germain, and a return to the now King Jammy. Released from his Atlantic contract in 1994, he had chart-topping singles in Jamaica with "Bun It Down", "Hello Carol", and "Hot Like the Sun". He released the album Gangsta in 1995, now on VP Records, and Bangarang later that year (on Shanachie Records).

=== Conversion to Christianity ===
Stitchie was injured in a car crash in August 1997 while driving to Montego Bay to perform at the Reggae Sumfest festival, receiving cuts which required hospital treatment. Against medical advice he went on to perform as scheduled, after which he was given a Gideon Bible by a Canadian boy. After reading the Bible in his hotel room he became a Christian and soon moved away from his dancehall songs to work in gospel reggae. Although he completed a further album in the dancehall style (Raw Episode), he refused to promote it, and spent a period away from music, studying the Bible. His first album in the gospel reggae style was To God Be the Glory, released in 1999, with further albums following in a similar style. In 2002, he won the 'Outstanding Male Reggae Vocal Performance of the Year' award at Caribbean Gospel Music Marlin Awards. He later performed at several festivals after adopting gospel, on occasions giving Bible teachings to other performers.

In 2012, he was awarded an honorary doctorate from the Cornerstone Christian University in Orlando, Florida, in recognition of his contribution to gospel reggae music. He was officially inducted into the Gospel Hall of Fame on 17 January 2016, by The Jamaica GHF president and Founder Bishop Dr. J.O Baker in Kingston, Jamaica. In 2014 his autobiography, The Power of Determination, was published.

In 2021, he was honoured in the National Honours and Awards on Jamaica's 59th Anniversary of Independence.

=== Health and death ===
Stitchie suffered a major stroke in September 2024. He died at a hospital in Kingston, on 28 September 2026, aged 60.

== Discography ==
- Great Ambition (1987), Jammy's
- The Governor (1989), Atlantic
- Wild Jamaican Romances (1991), Atlantic
- Rude Boy (1993), Atlantic
- Mad Cobra Meets Lt. Stitchie and Beenie Man (1995), VP – with Mad Cobra and Beenie Man
- Gangsta (1995), VP
- Bangarang (1995), Shanachie
- Raw Episode (1999), Ernie B
- To God Be The Glory (1999),
- Ghetto Soldier (2000), Greensleeves
- Real Power (2000),
- Kingdom Ambassador (2004), Drum & Bass
- Real Life Story (2007), Drum & Bass
- Real Power (2007), Drum & Bass
- Serious Message (2010), Burnside
- Warrior (2015), Earlydays Records
- Masterclass (2019), XRAY Productions
