= Gospel reggae =

Music genre

Gospel reggae is a genre of music that originated in Jamaica, mixing reggae rhythms with Christian-themed lyrics.

Several reggae artists, many of whom were previously part of the Rastafari movement, have converted to Christianity and adopted gospel reggae as their primary style. Examples include Tommy Cowan, Carlene Davis, Nora Dean, Papa San, Sherwin Gardner, Sanchez, Lieutenant Stitchie and Kerron Ennis. Other major artists in the genre include Christafari. Lester Lewis has been described as a pioneer of gospel reggae, having won the Jamaica Cultural Development Commission Gospel Song Competition in 1989 with "Every Time I Read My Bible".

The popularity of gospel reggae has been seen as a sign that reggae has taken broader hold in Jamaica, having previously been strongly identified with the Rastafarian community. Popular gospel reggae DJs include DJ Proclaima from the UK. He has specialised in the genre for over two decades, reaching millions of people worldwide.
