= Ras Shorty I =

Trinidadian soca musician (1941–2000)

Ras Shorty I (6 October 1941 – 12 July 2000), born Garfield Blackman and also known as Lord Shorty, was a Trinidadian calypsonian and soca musician, known as the Father of Soca and The Love Man.

== Biography ==
He was born Garfield Blackman in Lengua Village, Princes Town, Trinidad, and rose to fame as "Lord Shorty" with his 1963 hit "Cloak and Dagger", subsequently taking the name Ras Shorty. A prolific musician, composer and innovator, Shorty experimented with fusing calypso and the other Indian-inspired music, including chutney music, for nearly a decade before unleashing "the soul of calypso", soca music. Shorty was the first to really define his music and with "Indrani" in 1973 and the album Endless Vibration in 1975. He thought of "Indrani" as the start of soca, although the reception wasn't as good; many thought it was more chutney-flavored. He responded to the reception by replacing the Indian instruments with traditional European instruments, marking his first evolution of the soca sound. Indrani "introduced a fresh, energetic rhythm that revolutionized the calypso genre, ultimately leading to Soca as a distinct musical form."

On 30 August 1977, Shorty's friend and collaborator Maestro (Cecil Hume) died in an accident in Trinidad and his loss was felt by Shorty, who penned "Higher World" as a tribute.

In Dominica, Shorty had attended an Exile One performance of cadence-lypso, and collaborated with Dominica's 1969 Calypso King, Lord Tokyo, and two calypso lyricists, Chris Seraphine and Pat Aaron, in the early 1970s, who wrote him some creole lyrics. Soon after, Shorty released a song, "Ou Petit", with words such as "Ou di mwen ou piti Shorty" (meaning "you told me you are small Shorty"), a combination of calypso, cadence and kwéyòl. Shorty's 1974 Endless Vibrations and Soul of Calypso brought soca to its peak of international fame.

Soca's development as a musical genre included its fusion with calypso, cadence, and Indian musical instruments—particularly the dholak, tabla and dhantal—as demonstrated in Lord Shorty's classic compositions "Ïndrani" and "Shanti Om". His fame continued to grow throughout the 1970s, and he became one of the country's top performers. He recorded tracks such as "Kim" and "Money Eh No Problem", which was a stinging political and social commentary based on the words of Trinidad's then Prime Minister, Eric Williams of the People's National Movement. "Money Eh No Problem" was used in a political advertising campaign in 2000 for the United National Congress while Shorty lay on his deathbed unable to protest the use of his music for the wrong reasons, a guiding principle behind his life choices.

In 1984, he voiced his disenchantment with soca, claiming it was being used for the wrong reasons. A short time thereafter, he embraced Rastafari, a Christian belief, adopted the name Ras Shorty I and moved with his family to the Piparo forest in the southern hills of Central Range (Trinidad and Tobago), where he and his family focused on creating faith-based music. His son Sheldon Blackman said of their time there that "A creative life is what was encouraged, basically" plus "a very strong spiritual — Christian — foundation."

In the late 1980s, he began recording again, fusing soca and gospel in a style he called 'jamoo'. He continued recording into the late 1990s, writing hits such as "Watch Out My Children", which focuses on the dangers of drug abuse. The song was recorded in ten languages and was adopted by the UN in an anti-cocaine campaign. He toured transnationally with his band, the Love Circle, which consisted mainly of family members. During his lifetime Lord Shorty fathered a total of 23 children. The Love Circle included his wife Claudette and sons Eldon, Sheldon and Isaac, who have gone on to record several highly infectious hits, including "Blessed are the Elders" and "To The Ceiling". His daughters, Marge, Nehilet and Avion Blackman, also have successful careers in recording and fashion design. Artist Ataklan has also benefited under the musical training of Ras Shorty I and has gone on to become a maverick of the rapso tradition. The family aims to put across positive messages with their music, focusing especially on youth. They also exhort modern soca artists to preach positivity and the word of God through their music. Through his daughter Abbi Blackman, Ras Shorty is the grandfather of singer Nailah Blackman.
