= StompTown Revival (EP) =

EP by StompTown Revival
- Released: October 2, 2012
- Genres: Worship; Gospel; rock; folk; blues; soul; country; pop; alternative rock; americana; Christian pop; Christian rock; Christian country; Christian alternative rock; indie folk; indie rock; indie pop; roots rock; southern gospel; southern rock; southern soul
- Length: 25:48
- Label: Save the City

StompTown Revival is the first extended play from StompTown Revival. Save the City Records released the EP on October 2, 2012.

== Critical reception ==
Professional ratings
Review scores
Source	Rating
Christianity Today	4/5 stars
Cross Rhythms	9/10 squares
HM Magazine	4/5 stars
Jesus Freak Hideout	4.5/5 stars 4/5 stars
Louder Than the Music	4/5 stars
New Release Today	4/5 stars
The Phantom Tollbooth	4/5 stars

Argyrakis writes, "some serious 'spiritual stomp.'" Cummings calls "a breath of fresh air". Roberts comments "finally brought something fresh to the table." Weaver states "[they] have teamed together to forge a sound that sounds classically American, but yet new and refreshing". Caldwell says "this EP feels like a palate cleanser from over-produced and same-sounding worship music." Sheads responds "every track on StompTown Revival's EP oozes with authenticity and soul." Dalton affirms "That fondness gives them a unique sound among Christian artists." Davies replies "Brilliant stuff."

== Track listing ==
No.	Title	Writer(s)	Length
1.	"Guiding Me Home"	Brandon Bee, Gabe Martinez	3:57
2.	"Waiting for the Man"	Bee, Martinez	4:25
3.	"Born Again"	Bee, Martinez	4:22
4.	"Anthem of Love"	Bee, Martinez	3:58
5.	"The Sun Will Find a Way"	Bee, Martinez	4:05
6.	"Leaning on the Everlasting Arms"	Elisha A. Hoffman, Anthony J. Showalter	5:01
Total length:			25:48

== Chart performance ==
Chart (2012)	Peak position
US Top Christian Albums (Billboard)	48
US Heatseekers Albums (Billboard)	47
