= Valley of Decision (album) =

Studio album by Christafari
- Released: 1996
- Recorded: Radio Ranch, Franklin, TN
- Genre: Reggae
- Label: Gotee Records
- Producer: Scott Blackwell and Christafari

Christafari chronology
Soulfire (1995)	Valley of Decision (1996)	Word, Sound, and Power (1999)

Valley of Decision is the third album by the Christian Reggae group Christafari, the second released on the Gotee label.

== Track listing ==
All songs written by Mark Mohr and Johnny Guerrero.

1. "Valley of Decision"
2. "Can't Stop"
3. "Best Friend (Intro)"
4. "Best Friend"
5. "Dinghi (Interlude)"
6. "My Eyes"
7. "Modern Day Pharisee"
8. "Surrender"
9. "Set Me Free"
10. "Freedom Dub"
11. "Conquering Lion (Intro)"
12. "Jungle Inna Babylon"
13. "Keep On Looking Up"
14. "Live This Love"
15. "Big Dance (Interlude)"
16. "Time"
17. "Him Die Fi Yuh"
18. "No Puedo Dejar (Intro)"
19. "No Puedo Dejar (Can't Stop Spanish)"

== Personnel ==
- Mark Mohr – Lead vocals, Raggamuffin chat, percussion, drum programming
- Erik Sven Sundin – Lead vocals
- Vanessa Mohr – Background vocals and dance
- Marky Rage – Keyboards, background vocals
- Bill Kasper – Lead and rhythm guitars
- Lyndon Barrington Allen – Bass, background vocals
- Ken Yarnes – Drums
- Johnny Guerrero – Saxophone (solo on track 8), keyboard bass (track 12), drums (track 17), horn arrangements, drum programming, background vocals

=== Additional musicians ===
- Rob Ray - Keyboards
- Sam Levine – Saxophone
- Douglas Maffet – Saxophone
- Barry Green – Trombone, trombone solo on track 13
- Chris Dunn – Trombone
- William Huber – Trombone
- Joey Ko – Trumpet, transcriptions, and additional arranging
- Tommy (Musa) Smith – Percussion on tracks 5 and 15
- Tim Akers - Drum programming
- Scott Blackwell - Drum programming, keyboards, keyboard bass on track 12
- Reid Waltz - Drum programming, background vocals
- Joe Freel - Background vocals
- Emily Sundin - Background vocals

=== Credits ===
- Reid Waltz - Recording
- Joe Baldridge - Mixing
- Scott Blackwell - Production, mixing on track 12
- Pete Martinez - Mixing assistant
- Randy Leroy - Mastering
- Kerri Stuart - Art direction
- Chuck Hargett - Layout design
- David Dobson - Photography
- Toby - Executive producer
- Joey - Executive producer
- Todd - Executive producer
