= Sherwin Gardner =

Trinidadian gospel reggae singer

Sherwin Gardner (Arima) is a Trinidadian gospel reggae singer. He is noted for his use of dancehall style and patois. On 2015 he won the ABGMA Best Gospel Album of the Year award, on 2017 the ABGMA Best Praise/Worship award and on 2024 the ABGMA Inspirational Song of the Year award.

== Discography ==
- Power In The Name 1998
- 100% Sold Out 1999
- Revelation Unfold 2000
- I Rather Jesus 2001
- Leaning 2002
- Closer 2003
- Who I Am 2004
- Elevation 2007
- Borderless 2010
- Relentless 2011
- Nascent 2013
- Veinticinco 2014
- Fixer 2015
