= Panam Percy Paul =

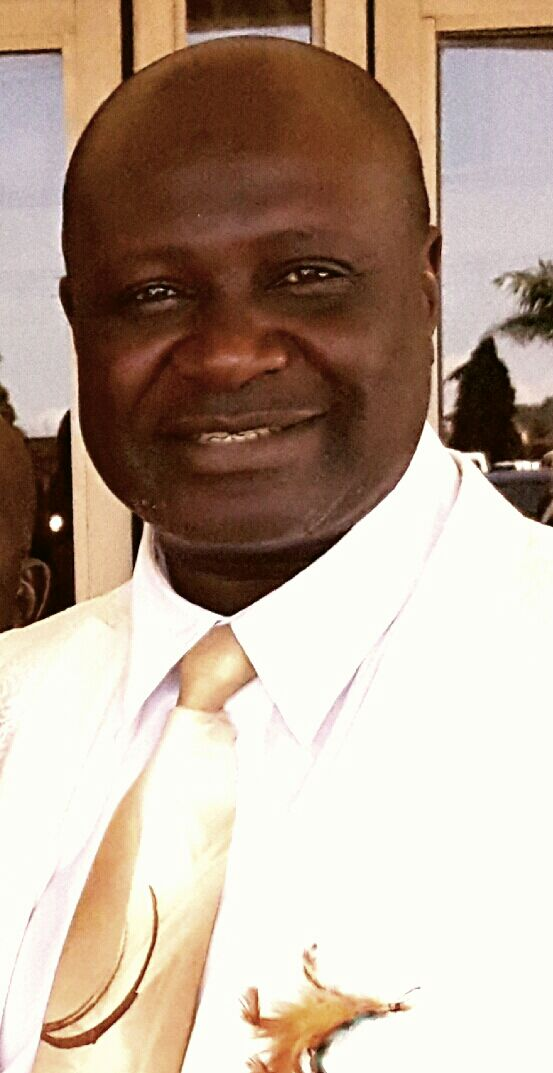
- In 2015

Background information
- Born: Bakulipanam Percy Paul Mokungah; Numan, Adamawa State, Nigeria
- Origin: Adamawa State, Nigeria
- Genre: Gospel
- Occupations: Singer, guitarist, organist
- Instruments: Harmonica, guitar
- Years active: (1981–present)

Bakulipanam Percy Paul Mokungah, widely known by his stage name Panam Percy Paul, is a Nigerian gospel singer, songwriter, actor and multi-instrumentalist whose musical career spans 40 years. He was born to major Paul Harley, an officer in the Nigerian Army, and composer Paulina Paul Mokungah in 1958. Paul's kind of music is praise and worship styled in the feel of country music and African high life.

== Musical career ==
Panam Percy Paul started his musical career at age twenty while he was still in school as an undergraduate at Kaduna Polytechnic. He worked at Radio ELWA Christian Communications as a production supervisor and engineer.

== Personal life ==
Panam Percy Paul is from Adamawa State Nigeria. Paul married his wife, Tina, in 1981. Together, they have four children.

== Awards and nominations ==
Year	Event	Prize	Result	Ref
1992	FAME Gospel Music Award	Artist of the Year	Nominated	
1992	FAME Gospel Music Award	Best Producer of the Year	Nominated	
1992	FAME Gospel Music Award	Best Vocalist of the Year	Won	
1995	BMI Music Award	Artist of the Year	Won	
1996	Adamawa State Excellence	—N/a	Won	
2014	Crystal Awards	—N/a	Crystal Lifetime Achievement Award	Won
2018	Who is Who Awards	Award of Excellence in Music	Recognized Impact Maker on the Plateau	Won

== Discography ==
=== Studio albums ===
- Beautiful People (1976)
- Oh Ye Gates (1978)
- Don`t You Cry (1980)
- Bring Down the Glory 1 (1984)
- Panam Percy Paul and Friends (1987)
- Bring Down the Glory 2: God of War (1989)
- At This Christmas with Panam Percy Paul (1991)
- Bring Down The Glory 3: Higher Than High (1993)
- Master of the Universe (1995)
- Bring Down the Glory 4: Deep Intimacy (2003)
- Cheer up (2007)
- Destiny (2009)
- Return
- Bring Down Your Glory 5: Throne Of Grace (2013)

=== Other works ===
Apart from music, Panam has written a book titled "Bring Down the Glory", named after his album. He also has a college called the "Panam College of Music Ministry" in Jos, Plateau State of Nigeria. His record label Panam Music World serves as an organization to assist the education of musicians.
