= Soulfire (Christafari album) =

Studio album by Christafari
- Released: 1995
- Recorded: Fun Attic, Franklin, TN
- Label: Gotee Records
- Producer: Mark Himerman

Christafari chronology
Soulfire (1995)	Valley of Decision (1996)

Professional ratings
Review scores
Source	Rating
CCM Magazine	not rated

Soulfire is the second album by the Christian Reggae group Christafari, their first released on the Gotee label.

== Track listing ==
1. "Listening" - 4:33
2. "Thanks And Praise (Interlude)" - 0:11
3. "Selah" - 5:17
4. "Christafari" - 5:04
5. "Soulfire" - 4:05
6. "Inside Burning" - 4:01
7. "Niyabinghi (Interlude)" - 0:13
8. "Sitting And Watching (Fly Away)" - 5:16
9. "Give A Little One Love" - 4:50
10. "Uhuru (Interlude)" - 0:15
11. "Come Children" - 5:30
12. "Spirit Cry" - 4:33
13. "Dj Intro" - 0:56
14. "Boomerang" - 3:42
15. "Wha? (Interlude)" - 0:10
16. "Crucified" - 5:01
