= Valley of Decision =

The Valley of Decision is a biblical name given to the Valley of Jehoshaphat by the prophet Joel. (Note: "Valley of Decision" is capitalised in some translations, e.g. the New Century Version and the New English Translation. It is rendered in lower case in most other versions.) It is the location of Jehovah's inflictions on Zion's enemies. The Bible mentions the Valley of Jehoshaphat only twice and identifies it as the final place where God will judge the nations that will gather in this valley in order to try to destroy Israel. Jehoshaphat means "Yahweh judges"; theologian Carl-Albert Keller adopts the term "the Valley Called 'YHWH judges'". The book of Joel describes this event as a gathering of all of the armies of the world into this Valley, where the Lord will pronounce judgment on all of them. The predicted and foreseen number of deaths is so extraordinarily high in this day of divine judgment that it will take seven months for the people of Israel to bury all of the dead men (Ezekiel 39:12-16). The dead ones will have their resting place under the soil of Israel and will never return home.

In Christian thinking, the assembly of the multitudes waiting in the valley of decision is associated with the second advent of Christ.
