= Avion Blackman =

Trinidadian musician (born 1976)

- Born: 30 January 1976 (age 50); San Fernando, Trinidad and Tobago
- Origin: United States
- Genres: Reggae
- Years active: 1989–present
- Label: Lion of Zion Entertainment
- Website: www.avionblackman.com

Avion Claudette Trudy Henrietta Blackman (born 30 January 1976) is a Trinidadian reggae recording artist, and the wife of Christafari frontman Mark Mohr. She has produced three solo albums, as well as providing vocals and bass guitar for Christafari since 2003.

== Early life ==
Blackman was born in San Fernando, Trinidad, the daughter of famed calypsonian, Lord Shorty. Her father invented Soca music (The Soul of Calypso) and later changed his name to Ras Shorty I and created Jamoo music. When Blackman was at the age of four, a spiritual quest prompted her father to move the entire family into the forests of Trinidad endeavoring to create a simpler and more humble lifestyle for him and his family.

The next twenty years of her life were spent living in the forest, seven miles from the village of Piparo, where she was home-schooled along with her 24 brothers and sisters. The family lived a lifestyle of simplicity, with no electricity or plumbing, and growing most of what they ate off the land they were living on.

== Starting in music ==
Because of her father's musical connections and roots, music was always a big part of Blackman's life. Even at the age of four she was singing in front of large crowds. When they all moved to the jungle, the entire family was involved in playing instruments and singing in Ras Shorty I's band The Love Circle and would perform regular concerts, tour the Island, perform for visitors and do regular television appearances. At the age of 14 she started playing bass for the family's band "The Love Circle" and made her first solo recordings, "Oh Why" and "So Free", for their Children of the Jamoo Journey album.

== Christafari ==
In 2002, while she was teaching a seminar in Trinidad, Blackman met Christafari founder, Mark Mohr and 18 months later they were married in Los Angeles. By this point Blackman had begun to play bass and provide vocals for the band, lending her voice to the songs "Hiding Place" and "My Sustenance" for the album Gravity. She has been an integral part of the band since then, involved with all their subsequent albums and tours.

== Solo career ==
=== Onyinye ===
It was during the recording of the Christafari children's album Reggae Sunday School, that the idea of a solo album was first pitched by husband Mark and despite her initial reluctance, Blackman's debut album Onyinye was released later that year (2005). The album was released to critical acclaim and, at the 2006 Caribbean Gospel Music Marlin Awards, the album was given top honors, being declared the album of the year as well as winning in the Contemporary Female Vocal Performance category for the song "Marvelous Beauty". She was the first non-Jamaican to receive the award.

=== Sweet Life ===
In 2008, the follow-up album, Sweet Life, was released, showing a move towards more reggae roots. The song "Yeshua" was a favorite and to this day Christafari will often close their concerts with this song. She picked up another Marlin award for the song "Sweet Life".

=== Third World Girl ===
In 2011, work began on Blackman's third album with a month-long trip to Hawaii and an expressed wish to "write and record a new song every day". Initially, recording was intended to be a demo session only but production instead turned into a full recording session. At the end of the month, a full album had been created and a music video for the title track had been filmed among the jungles and waterfalls of Hawaii. In 2012, the album was released and explored themes such as healing and relationships.

== Other collaborations ==
As well as her solo work and involvement with Christafari, Blackman has also contributed to various collaborations including working on albums by Sherwin Gardner and band-mate Jennifer Howland. She has also recorded around a dozen unreleased songs for ABC television, with placements in TV shows such as General Hospital, All My Children and One Life to Live.

== Discography ==
=== Solo ===
- Onyinye (2005)
- Sweet Life (2008)
- Third World Girl (2011)
- "Greatest Hits" (2013)

=== Other work ===
- The Love Circle, Watch Out My Children, Jamoo GoodNews Ltd. (1989)
- The Love Circle, Children of the Jamoo Journey, Jamoo GoodNews Ltd. (1999)
- The Love Circle, Jamoo Victory, Jamoo GoodNews Ltd. (1999)
- Various Artists, Trinidad World Music, Rituals Music (2000)
- The Love Circle, Home Grown, Jamoo GoodNews Ltd. (2003)
- Various Artists, The Gathering: Trinidad & Tobago, Lion of Zion Ent. (2004)
- Geneman, Long Time (Background Vocals) (2010)
- Reggae Revolution Mixtape, Various (2010)
- Jennifer Howland, Daughter of the King (2010)
- Sherwin Gardner, Relentless (2011)
- Reggae Revolution 2, Christafari and Friends (2012)
- Solomon Jabby, "Rocksteady" (2012)
