= Watch Out My Children =

1997 song performed by Ras Shorty I

Song by Ras Shorty I

from the album Watch Out My Children
- Released: 1989
- Recorded: 1989
- Genre: Reggae; Calypso
- Length: 6:11
- Label: Shorty Music
- Songwriter(s): Gary Blackman; Ras Shorty I
- Producer(s): Ras Shorty I

"Watch Out My Children" is a song composed and recorded by the late calypsonian of Trinidad, Ras Shorty I and his band the Love Circle in 1989. It was originally performed live on B.U.C.K.S. Carnival Expo 1989, which shortly after released as part of a live album with the same name. It is a song that advises the youth to reject drug use. It was translated into ten languages. The song was rereleased on his 1999 album, Jamoo Victory.

"Watch Out My Children" was adopted by the United Nations as the theme song for its campaign against the proliferation of drug abuse.
