= Christafari =

American Christian reggae band

- Origin: United States
- Genre: Gospel reggae
- Years active: 1989–present
- Labels: Lion of Zion, Gotee
- Members: Mark Mohr; Avion Blackman-Mohr; Ziza Mohr; Iris Spence; Renato Taimes; Alexander Avila; Tim "Jah Pickney" Linnard
- Website: christafari.com

Christafari is a Christian reggae band formed in 1989. It is centered on Christ Jesus and follows the personality of ordained minister Mark Mohr (husband of Avion Blackman} (born October 23, 1971), an American, and born-again Christian. Until the age of 17, Mohr was a Rastafarian.

== Background ==
As a rebellious drug addicted youth, Mohr found an affinity for reggae music and became a marijuana grower and Rastafarian after a visit to Jamaica in 1986. He became well-versed in reggae music and learned Jamaican patois, the dialect prevalent in most reggae music. In 1989 the seventeen-year-old Mohr stopped using marijuana and committed his life to Jesus at JH Ranch, a Christian camp. Two weeks later at another Christian youth camp, Mohr wrote and performed his first gospel reggae song "Give Me Everything I Need" at a talent show. The bass-player that day said; "So you're no longer a Rastafarian, you're a Christafarian." The name stuck. Initially called the "Christafarians" Mark was backed by the "Steadfast" crew for his first few shows (September and October 1989). Eventually Mohr shortened the name to "Christafari", (pronounced Christ-a-far-eye) and pieced together his own band members.

In 1993 Mohr enrolled in Biola University and received his ordination in 1997.

Christafari's first album, Reggae Worship, reached the Billboard charts and created a buzz in the industry, garnering the attention of DC Talk's tobyMac, who signed the group to Gotee Records. Their second album, Soulfire, became an early success for the fledgling label. Their third album, Valley of Decision, also for Gotee, spent 32 weeks on Billboard's top 15 chart and also placed among the top 10 of the magazine's "Top Reggae Albums" chart.

WordSound&Power marked Christafari's departure from Gotee and the birth of Mohr's Lion of Zion Entertainment record label. The album was nominated in four categories in the 2000 Caribbean Gospel Music Marlin Awards. Christafari then released DubSound&Power, the band's first dub album and arguably the first Christian dub album ever recorded. After this the group released Palabra Sonido Y Poder (Word Sound & Power), the group's Spanish debut that featured the single "El Amor De Mi Vida" (No. 1 in 11 Latin American Countries). After this Christafari released Gravity (2003), Gravitational Dub (2004) and their first children's album Reggae Sunday School (2005). 2007 Marked the release of Christafari's To the Foundation. Christafari toured 180 shows in 20 countries in promotion of To the Foundation.

In early 2009 the group headed back into the studio to record their 20th anniversary album "No Compromise" with subsequent tours in Europe, Latin America and the USA. In late 2009 the band went back into their studio the "Zionic Sounds Dub Lab" to record their second Spanish album, Reggae De Redencion. This project was released in mid-2010. In late 2011 they released two dub albums; Majestic Heights in Dub and Dub Shots. They also released Gospel Reggae Praise, a compilation project.

In 2012, Christafari released Reggae Worship: A Roots Revival, their first worship album in almost 20 years. This breakthrough album once again catapulted them onto the Billboard Charts. The CD debuted at No. 3 on the Billboard Reggae Chart, No. 10 on Billboard's Christian Albums Chart and No. 39 on the Independent Albums Chart. Nearly nine months after this album was released, Christafari jumped to No. 1 on the Billboard Reggae Albums Chart. This marks the first time in Billboard's history that a Christian artist has secured the top spot. The band was also featured on ABC Family's The 700 Club, and TBN filmed a live concert appearance in Hawaii for a special broadcast.

Each of Christafari's subsequent full-length albums, Reggae Christmas, Greatest Hits Vol. 1, Greatest Hits Vol. 2, Anthems, Hearts of Fire, and Original Love, have all hit the No. 1 position on the Billboard Reggae Charts.

In 2009 Christafari started their own film company called "Rank and File". The group now has around 80 music videos on YouTube including hits like "Hosanna," "Oceans" and "Here I Am To Worship" that have millions of views. Ever since the band decided to become full-time Musicianaries (musical missionaries) in 2012, they have had a busy schedule ministering around 125 times a year on every inhabited continent. So far Christafari has performed in 35 countries, 46 states, at 2 Olympic games and before the president of the United States.

The band's 2017 album Hearts of Fire entered the Billboard Reggae Albums chart at No. 1, their third No. 1 album on the chart.

On April 13, 2018, Christafari released the studio album "Original Love" (Lion of Zion Entertainment) which debuted at No. 1 on the Billboard Reggae Albums Chart. This is the group's seventh consecutive album to debut at No. 1. Subsequent albums were "99.4.1 (Reckless Love)" and "Dub Supreme" in 2018 and 2019) and their long anticipated "Musicianaries: At Any Cost" (2020). The group has visited around 25 nations per year touring these albums.

== Style ==
Initially Christafari's lyrics were characterized by a heart for Rastafarians, a passion for reaching the drug-afflicted counter-culture and a distinctly evangelical Christian message. Two examples are the songs "Why You A-go Look?" (WordSound&Power) and "Teachings of His Majesty" (Reggae Redemption Songs II), which use the words of Haile Selassie I (former Emperor of Ethiopia) to challenge the veneration of this Christian king as Almighty God incarnate.

Musically, the group fuses worship, roots and dancehall to create their own signature sound. Full of vibrant horns and rich female harmonies (by Avion Blackman), the group has eight members. In 1997 there was a division in the group that led to a split.

Mohr came out of the split releasing the WordSound&Power and launching Lion of Zion Entertainment. Erik Sundin and others formed Temple Yard. While Christafari continued with roots reggae and dancehall, Temple Yard was fusion oriented, showing pop, reggae, soul, and gospel influence similar to artists like UB40 or Big Mountain. Temple Yard released one album on Gotee Records in 1999, two more independent albums (in 2002 and 2005) and subsequently broke up.

== Criticisms ==
=== Rastafari ===
Some Rastafarians are offended because a few Christafari members wear dreads and in the past they have used their colors (red, gold and green) in an attempt to become all things to all men and bring Rastas to Christ. Some Rastafarians reject this approach and view Christafari's message as a direct attack on the divinity of Selassie I. Christafari argues that they are only fulfilling the challenge set forth by Haile Selassie himself who publicly denied being Christ and said, "Let us labor to lead our sisters and brothers to our Savior Jesus Christ." Selassie was an Ethiopian Orthodox Christian and many Rastafarians identify themselves as such, though others identify as Jewish by religion and Rastafari by ideology. Christafari are clearly born again evangelical Christians.

=== Christian ===
Some Christians are offended because Mohr and other band members wear dreadlocks and sing in a style typically associated with Rastafari. They have also criticized Mohr over the name of the group and the use of the word "Jah" in songs to refer to the Judeo-Christian-Islamic God. The band has previously defended the use of the word with the argument that "Jah" is a shortening for "Yahweh" (also spelled "Jahweh") as used in the Bible. They are not the only Christian musical group to do this; a prime example is P.O.D.

== Discography ==
- Reggae Worship Volume I (1993)
- Soulfire (1994)
- Valley of Decision (1996) - US Reggae No. 7
- WordSound&Power (1999) - US Reggae No. 9
- Reggae Worship: First Fruits of Christafai (2000) - a re-release of their first album with some new material and previously unreleased earlier recordings.
- Dub, Sound, and Power (2000) - a collection of Dub versions of songs, mostly from WordSound&Power.
- Palabra Sonido Y Poder (2000) - versions of their songs overdubbed in Spanish.
- Gravity (2003) - US Reggae No. 15
- Gravitational Dub (2004) - a collection of Dub versions of songs, mostly from Gravity
- Reggae Sunday School (2005)
- To the Foundation (2007)
- No Compromise (2009)
- Reggae de Redención (2010)
- Majestic Heights in Dub (2011)
- Dubshots (2011)
- Reggae Worship: A Roots Revival (2012) - US Reggae No. 1
- Reggae Revolution 2, Christafari and Friends (2012)
- Reggae Christmas (2013)
- Greatest Hits Vol. 1 (2014)
- Greatest Hits Vol. 2 (2014)
- Anthems (2015) - US Reggae No. 1
- Anthems Deluxe (2016)
- Dub Worship: Echoes of Mercy (2017)
- Hearts of Fire (2017) - US Reggae No. 1
- Dubs of Fire (2018)
- Original Love (2018) – US Reggae No. 1
- 99.4.1 (Reckless Love) (2018)
- Dub Supreme (2019)
- Musicianaries: At Any Cost (2020)
