= Yemi Alade discography =

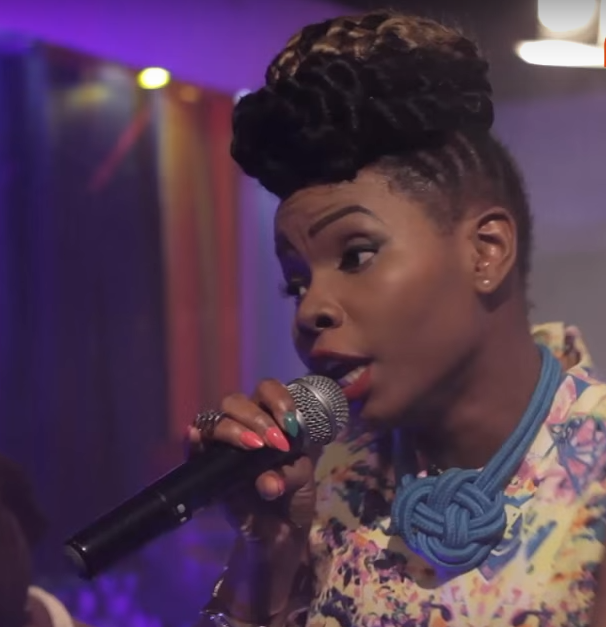
- Yemi Alade performing Johnny with the Ndani Tv in 2014
- Studio albums: 5
- EPs: 1
- Live albums: 5
- Singles: 58
- Music videos: 51
- Promotional singles: 4

Nigerian singer Yemi Alade's discography consists of five studio albums, two extended plays, fifty-nine singles, four promotional singles, fifty-two music videos, and two cameo appearances.

== Albums ==
Title	Details
King of Queens	Released: 2 October 2014; Label: Effyzzie Music Group; Formats: Digital download, CD
Mama Africa	Released: 25 March 2016; Label: Effyzzie Music Group; Formats: Digital download, CD
Black Magic	Released: 15 December 2017; Label: Effyzzie Music Group; Formats: Digital download, CD
Woman of Steel	Released: 30 August 2019; Label: Effyzzie Music Group, Universal; Formats: Digital download, CD
Empress	Released: 20 November 2020; Label: Effyzzie Music Group; Formats: Digital download, CD
Rebel Queen	Released: 26 July 2024; Label: Effyzzie Music Group; Formats: Digital download, CD
It's Yemi Alade	Released: 11 September 2026; Label: Effyzzie Music Group; Formats: Digital download, Streaming

=== Extended plays ===
Title	Details
Mama Afrique	Released: 30 June 2017; Label: Effyzzie Music Group; Formats: Digital download
Queen Don Com	Released: 13 August 2021; Label: Effyzzie Music Group; Formats: Digital download
African Baddie	Released: 2 December 2022; Label: Effyzzie Music Group; Formats: Digital download
Mamapiano	Released: 15 December 2023; Label: Effyzzie Music Group; Formats: Digital download

=== Video albums ===
Title	Details
Looking for My Johnny	Released: 2 November 2015; Label: Effyzzie Music Group; Format: Digital download, CD

== Singles ==
Title	Year	Peak chart position	Album
"Fimisile"	2009		Non-album single
"Ghen Ghen Love"	2013	~~--~~	Non-album single
"Johnny"	2013	~~--~~	King of Queens
"Tangerine"	2014	~~--~~	King of Queens
"Kissing"	2014	~~--~~	King of Queens
"Taking Over Me"	2015	~~--~~	King of Queens
"Temperature"	2015	~~--~~	King of Queens
"Duro Timi"	2015	~~--~~	King of Queens
"Na Gode"	2015	~~--~~	Mama Africa
"Do as I Do"	2015	~~--~~	Mama Africa
"Ferrari"	2016	~~--~~	Mama Africa
"Kom Kom" (featuring Flavour)	2016	~~--~~	Mama Africa
"Africa" (featuring Sauti Sol)	2016	~~--~~	Mama Africa
"Tumbum"	2016	~~--~~	Mama Africa
"Knack Am"	2017	~~--~~	Black Magic
"Single and Searching"	2017	~~--~~	Black Magic
"Heart Robber"	2017	~~--~~	Black Magic
"Bum Bum"	2018	~~--~~	Black Magic
"Kpirim"	2018	~~--~~	Black Magic
"Oh My Gosh"	2018	~~--~~	Non-album single
"Oga"	2018	~~--~~	Non-album single
"How I Feel"	2018	~~--~~	Non-album single
"Bounce"	2019	~~--~~	Non-album single
"Home"	2019	~~--~~	Woman of Steel
"Give Dem"	2019	~~--~~	Woman of Steel
"Vibe"	2019	~~--~~	Woman of Steel
"Shake"(featuring Duncan Mighty)	2019	~~--~~	Woman of Steel
"Remind You"	2020	~~--~~	Woman of Steel
"Shekere" (featuring Angélique Kidjo)	2020	--	Woman of Steel
"Boyz"	2020	--	Empress
"True Love"	2020	15 Top Triller Global	Empress
"I choose You" (featuring Dadju)	2020	9 Top Triller Global	Empress
"Deceive" (featuring Rudeboy)	2020	~~--~~	Empress
"Turn Up"	2021	~~--~~	Empress
"Dancina"	2021	11 Top Triller Global	Empress
"Rain"	2021	~~--~~	Empress
"Enjoyment"	2021	~~--~~	Non-album single
"Jo Jo" (featuring Bisa Kdei)	2023		Non-album single

=== Promotional singles ===
Title	Year	Peak chart position
"Classic Girl Freestyle" (Jidenna's Classic Man cover)	2015	--
"Koffi" Anan" (freestyle)	2016	--
'Kpirim" (Dance cover)	2016	--
"On top of the World" ft Jennifer Hudson, Yemi Alade, Monali Thakur, Pixie Lott and Luan Santana	2017	--

== Cameo appearances ==
List of non-single cameo appearances, with other performing artists, showing year released and album name

Title	Year	Other artists	Album	Ref
"Baby Hello"	2015	Wande Coal	Single	
"Mon Bébe"	2021	Patoranking	Three	

== Music videos ==
=== As lead artist ===
List of music videos as lead artist, showing date released, video directors and views
Title	Video release date	Director (s)	Views on YouTube	Ref
"Ghen Ghen Love"	December 8, 2012	Paul Gambit (Gambit Pictures)	898k+	
Bamboo	July 10, 2013	Director Frames	754k+	
Johnny	March 3, 2014	Clarence Peters	174m+	
Tangerine	July 8, 2014	Clarence Peters	7.2m+	
Kissing	October 16, 2014	Sesan	15m+	
Taking Over Me ^{(featuring Phyno)}	February 3, 2015	Justin Campos, Taiye Aliyu	7m+	
Temperature ^{(featuring Dil)}	March 13, 2015	Ovie Etseyatse	3m+	
Kissing featuring Marvin ^{(french version)}	April 28, 2015	Ovie Etseyatse	10m+	
Pose ^{(featuring R2bees)}	June 11, 2015	Paul Gambit	7m+	
Duro Timi	July 31, 2015	Ovie Etseyatse	419k+	
Sugar	September 23, 3015	Paul Gambit	491k+	
NaGode ^{(featuring Selebobo)}	November 4, 2015	Paul Gambit	32m+	
Na Gode (Swahili version)	January 25, 2016	Paul Gambit	7m+	
Ferrari	March 25, 2016	Clarence Peters	10m+	
Kom Kom ^{(featuring Flavour)}	May 18, 2016	Clarence Peters	11m+	
Africa (featuring Sauti Sol)	July 5, 2016	Ovie Etseyatse	26m+	
Want You	August 3, 2016	Ovie Etseyatse	3m+	
Tumbum	November 9, 2016	Paul Gambit	27m+	
Sugar n Spice	January 9, 2017	Ovie Etseyatse	3m+	
Get Through This (featuring Mi Casa)	February 20, 2017	Justin Campos	1m+	
Marry Me	February 28, 2017	Paul Gambit	3m+	
Charliee	July 20, 2017	Paul Gambit	2m+	
Knack Am	August 23, 2017	Clarence Peters	9m+	
Nakupenda featuring Nyanshiski (Swahili version)	October 11, 2017	Ovie Etseyatse	3m+	
Single& Searching (featuring Falz)	November 10, 2017	Clarence Peters	13m+	
Go Down	January 15, 2018	Paul Gambit	1m+	
Heart Robber	February 19, 2018	Clarence Peters	1m+	
Bum Bum	March 13, 2018	Sesan	40m+	
How I Feel	June 15, 2018	Ovie Etseyase	14m+	
Issokay	September 7, 2018	Ovie Etseyatse	2m+	
Oh My Gosh	September 21, 2018	Ovie Etseyatse	27m+	
Number One	November 23, 2018	Ovie Etseyatse	5m+	
Oga	January 10, 2019	Clarence Peters	4m+	
Yaji (featuring Slimcase and Brainee)	March 8, 2019	Mr C	3m+	
Oh My Gosh Remix (featuring Rick Ross)	April 29, 2019	Ryan Snyder	5m+	
Bounce	June 12, 2019	Sesan	2m+	
Home	August 30, 2019	Clarence Peters (Capital Dreams)	2m+	
Give Dem	September 24, 2019	Clarence Peters	2m+	
Vibe	October 28, 2019	Ovie Etseyatse	3m+	
Shake (featuring Duncan Mighty)	November 20, 2019	Paul Gambit	2m+	
Lai Lai	December 26, 2019	Paul Gambit	1m+	
Remind You	January 22, 2020	Ovie Etseyatse	1m+	
Shekere (featuring Angelique Kidjo)	February 5, 2020	Ovie Etseyase	19m+	
Boyz	June 17, 2020	Paul Gambit	6m+	
True Love	September 1, 2020	Paul Gambit	3m+	
I Choose You (featuring Dadju)	November 20, 2020	Ovie Etseyatse	3m+	
Deceive (featuring Rudeboy)	December 23, 2020	Clarence Peters	14m+	
Turn Up	February 18, 2021	Sesan	1m+	
Temptation ^{(featuring Patoranking})	April 7, 2021	Clarence Peters	590k	
Dancina	May 12, 2021	Paul Gambit	3m+	
Rain ^{(featuring Mzansi Youth Choir}	June 21, 2021	Ovie Etseyase	2m+	
Sweety	September 20, 2021	Ovie Etseyase	2m+	
Double Double ^{ft. Vtek}	October 29, 2021	Clarence Peters	5.1m+	
Fire	December 24, 2021	Ovie Etseyase	2m+	
Tell Somebody ft. Yaba Buluku Boyz	January 24, 2022	1Ikenna	1.7m+	
My Man ft. Kranium	August 10, 2022	Ovie Etseyase	2.8m+	
Begging	August 10, 2022	Clarence Peters	5.3m+	
Bubble it^{Yemi Alade & Spice}	September 16, 2022		7.1m+	
Baddie	December 2, 2022	Ovie Etseyase	6.8m+	
			Total = 693m+ (YouTube)	

=== As featured artist ===
List of music videos as featured artist, showing date released, directors and views
Title	Date released	Directors	Views	Ref
"Rihanna" ^{(Awilo Logomba featuring Yemi Alade)}	January 23, 2017	Clarence Peters	1m+	
"Nziyo Nyerudo _{(Jah Prayzah" featuring Yemi Alade)}	October 14, 2017	Godfather	8m+	
"911" (_{Krizbeatz featuring Yemi Alade and Harmonize}	December 14, 2017	Mr C	16m+	
"Ofana Nawe" _{(Mafikzolo featuring Yemi Alade)}	December 22, 2017	Garth Vorth Glen	824k+	
"Come and See My Moda" _{(Mzvee featuring Yemi Alade)}	January 12, 2018	Xbills Ebenzer	17m+	
This Woman _{(Maxi Priest featuring Yemi Alade)}	January 12, 2018	Wole Ogundare	612k+	
"I'm Available" _{(Waje featuring Yemi Alade)}	January 30, 2018	Ovie Etseyatse	390k+	
Sista _{(Charlotte Dipanda featuring Yemi Alade)}	April 30, 2018	Pharmpir	17m+	
Crazy Love _{(Flavour featuring Yemi Alade)}	October 28, 2018	Patrick Elis	14m+	
Show Me What You Got _{(Harmonize featuring Yemi Alade)}	April 8, 2019	Mr C	6m+	
Riddim _{(Krizbeatz featuring Yemi Alade and Skales)}	January 24, 2020	Mr C	535k	
