= List of awards and nominations received by Yemi Alade =

This is a list of awards and nominations received by Yemi Alade, a Nigerian singer and songwriter.

== Grammy Awards ==
Year	Nominee / work	Award	Result
2025	Tomorrow	Best African Music Performance	Nominated

== African Entertainment Awards USA (AEAUSA) ==
Year	Nominee / work	Award	Result
2018	Herself	Female Artist of the Year	Won
2019	Herself	Best Female Artist	Nominated
2019	Herself	Entertainer of the year	Nominated
2020	Herself	Best Female Artist	Nominated
2020	"Shekere" featuring Angelique Kidjo	Best Collaboration of the Year	Nominated
2020	Herself	Entertainer of the Year	Nominated
2020	Herself	Best Female artist (West Africa)	Won
2021	Herself	Artist of the year	Nominated
2021	Herself	Best female artist	Nominated
2021	Herself	Best female artist (West Africa)	Nominated
2021	Empress	Best Album of the year	Nominated

== AFRIMA Awards (All Africa Music Awards) ==
Year	Nominee / work	Award	Result
2015	"Kissing"	Best Female Artiste in Western Africa	Won
2018	"Herself"	Best Female Artiste	Won
2019	"Oh My Gosh"	Best Female Artiste in Western Africa	Nominated

== AFRIMMA Awards (African Muzik Magazine Awards) ==
Year	Nominee / work	Award	Result
2020	Herself	Best Female Western Africa	Nominated
2020	Herself	Best Live Act	Nominated
2019	Herself	Artiste of the Year	Nominated
2019	Herself	Best Live Act	Nominated
2018	"Oh My Gosh"	Best Female Western Africa	Won

== MTV African Music Awards ==
Year	Nominee / work	Award	Result
2015	Herself	Best Female	Won
2016	Herself	Best Female	Won
2016	Herself	Artiste of the Year	Nominated

== MTV Europe Music Awards ==
Year	Nominee / work	Award	Result
2015	Herself	Best African Act	Nominated

== Soundcity MVP Awards ==
Year	Nominee / work	Award	Result
2020	Herself	Best Female	Nominated
2020	Herself	African Artiste of the Year	Nominated
2020	Herself	Digital Artiste of the Year	Nominated
2019	Herself	Best Female	Nominated
2019	Herself	Best Pop	Nominated
2019	Herself	Digital Artiste of the Year	Nominated
2019	Herself	African Artiste of the Year	Nominated
2018	Herself	Best Female	Nominated
2018	Herself	Best Pop	Nominated
2018	Herself	Digital Artiste of the Year	Nominated
2018	Herself	African Artiste of the Year	Nominated
2017	Herself	Best Female	Nominated
2017	Herself	Digital Artiste of the Year	Nominated
2016	Herself	Best Female	Won
2016	Herself	Best Pop	Nominated
2016	Herself	African Artiste of the Year	Nominated

== Independent Music Awards ==
Year	Nominee / work	Award	Result
2016	Mama Africa	Best Album-World Beat	Won

== BET Awards ==
Year	Nominee / work	Award	Result
2015	Herself	Best International Act: Africa	Nominated
2016	Herself	Best International Act	Nominated

== Nigeria Entertainment Awards ==
Year	Nominee / work	Award	Result
2014	Herself	Female Artist of the Year	Nominated
2015	Herself	Female artiste of the year	Won
2015	Herself	Best Live Performer	Nominated
2016	Herself	Best Live Performer	Nominated

== City People Entertainment Awards ==
Year	Nominee / work	Award	Result
2014	Herself	Female Musician of the Year	Nominated

== MOBO Awards ==
Year	Nominee / work	Award	Result
2014	Herself	Best African Act	Nominated

== YEM Awards ==
Year	Nominee / work	Award	Result
2012	Herself	Female Artiste of the Year	Nominated

== ELOY Awards ==
Year	Nominee / work	Award	Result
2013	Herself	Most Promising Female	Nominated

== WatsUp TV Africa Music Video Awards ==
Year	Nominee / work	Award	Result	Ref
2016	Want You	African Video of the Year	Nominated	
2016	Want You	Best African Female Video	Nominated	
2016	Want You	Best West African Video	Nominated	
2016	Want You	Best Afro Pop Video	Nominated	
2016	Want You	Best African Dance Video	Nominated	
2016	Ferrari	Best African Traditional Video	Nominated	

== The Headies ==
Year	Nominee / work	Award	Result
2019	Herself	Best Performer	Won
2018	Herself	Best Performer	Won
2017	Herself	Best Performer	Won
2016	Herself	Artiste of the Year	Nominated
2015	Herself	Hip Hop World Revelation of the Year	Won
2015	"Duro Timi"	Best Vocal Performance (Female)	Nominated
2015	Herself	Artiste of the Year	Nominated
2015	King of Queens	Album of the Year	Nominated
2015	King of Queens	Best R&B/Pop Album	Nominated

== NET Honours ==
Year	Nominee / work	Award	Result
2021	Herself	Most Popular Musician	Nominated
