= Black Magic (Yemi Alade album) =

- Standard edition cover artwork; deluxe edition cover artwork features a different image of Yemi Alade

Studio album by Yemi Alade
- Released: December 15, 2017
- Genre: Afropop; Igbo highlife; R&B
- Length: 63:00
- Label: Effyzzie Music Group
- Producer: DJ Coublon; Vtek; Sarz; Krizbeatz; Young D; Sess; Fliptyce; IAmBeat; Philkeyz; 2Kriss; Echo

Yemi Alade chronology
Mama Afrique (2017)	Black Magic (2017)	Woman of Steel (2019)

Singles from Mama Africa
- 1. "Knack Am" Released: August 18, 2017; 2. "Single & Searching" Released: November 3, 2017; 3. "Heart Robber" Released: November 3, 2017; 4. "Bum Bum" Released: March 13, 2018; 5. "Kpirim" Released: May 22, 2018

Black Magic is the third studio album by Nigerian singer Yemi Alade, released by Effyzzie Music Group on December 15, 2017. A follow-up to her 2017 extended play Mama Afrique, the album features guest appearances from Falz and Olamide. Black Magic was made available for pre-order in November 2017. Prior to disclosing its title, Alade posted the acronym BM on social media and wanted her fans to guess its meaning. The album was produced by DJ Coublon, Vtek, Sarz, Krizbeatz, Young D, Sess, Fliptyce, IAmBeat, Philkeyz, 2Kriss and Echo. It was supported by the singles "Knack Am", "Single & Searching", "Heart Robber", "Bum Bum", and "Kpirim". Black Magic received generally negative reviews from music critics, who panned its lyrics and Alade's songwriting.

== Promotion ==
The DJ Coublon-produced track "Knack Am" was released on August 18, 2017, as the album's lead single. It contains elements of Igbo highlife and features strings by Fiokee. The Clarence Peters-directed music video for "Knack Am" was released on August 23, 2017. It features lush colours, aesthetics, theatrical expressions and a variety of dance styles. A snippet of the video was teased on Instagram a day before its official release. Fisayo Okare of Native magazine said the song's narrative is incoherent with the part of the video that were choreographed by children between the ages of 4 and 6.

The album's second single, "Single & Searching", was released on November 3, 2017. The song features a rap verse from Falz, marking his third collaboration with Alade. "Single & Searching" is a reversal of the duo's previous collaborative track "Marry Me". The song portrays Falz as a single man attempting to lure his love interest under the pretext of being single. The video for "Single & Searching", which was directed by Peters, features a cameo appearance from Nigerian comedian Gloria Oloruntobi. The video sheds light on married men who fail to provide for their wives, and showcases the pain women endure as a result of their husband's betrayal.

The love track "Heart Robber" was also released on November 3, 2017, as the album's third single. Musically, it is an Afrobeats song that contains a mid-tempo guitar riff and elements of Mariachi. The video for "Heart Robber" was recorded and directed by Peters. The album's fourth single, "Bum Bum", was released on March 13, 2018. The song's accompanying video features Afro-inspired styling and hip-hop apparel. In the video, Alade is seen embracing dance and showing off her moves with backup dancers. The album's fifth single, "Kpirim", was released on May 23, 2018. The accompanying music video for the song was filmed by Bukola Jimoh.

== Composition ==
Black Magic is an Afropop, Igbo highlife, and R&B album. "Knack Am" is composed of melodious strings and exotic instruments. The R&B track "Yaba Left" is named after the street lingo for Yaba's Federal Neuro Psychiatric Hospital. "Mr Stamina" is a South African house record that explores a bit of Alade's sexual desires. The Sess-produced track "Wonder Woman" mixes trap music with heavy basslines and a shortened TED speech. The dance song "Kpirim" contains elements of Igbo highlife, while "Bum Bum" features a percussion-heavy dancehall production.

== Critical reception ==
Black Magic received generally negative reviews from music critics. A Pulse Nigeria contributor, who goes by Jonathan, gave the album 2.5 stars out of 5, criticizing Alade's songwriting skills and saying she needs to "unlearn her basic inclination to record music in the way that she currently does". Wilfred Okiche of 360nobs considers Black Magic to be Alade's weakest record to date and said it "lacks the experimentation and ambitious drive of Mama Africa, as well as the hit making pose of King of Queens". A writer for the website Music in Africa criticized Alade for "covering geographical ground without giving the music and lyrics as much consideration".

== Track listing ==
Black Magic – Standard edition
No.	Title	Writer(s)	Producer(s)	Length
1.	"Single & Searching" (featuring Falz)	Yemi Eberechi Alade; Henry Enebeli	Young D	3:39
2.	"You"	Alade	Sarz	4:01
3.	"Kpirim"	Alade	Philkeyz	3:53
4.	"Mon La"	Alade	IAmBeat	4:18
5.	"Bum Bum"	Alade	Vtek	3:39
6.	"Mr. Stamina"	Alade	IAmBeat	3:43
7.	"Yaba Left"	Alade	Fliptyce	3:39
8.	"Wonder Woman"	Alade	Sess	3:58
9.	"Talku Talku"	Alade; Enebeli	Sess	3:46
10.	"Heart Robber"	Alade; Enebeli	Krizbeatz	3:46
11.	"Bread and Butter"	Alade	Philkeyz	3:45
12.	"Sky Scrapper"	Alade	Young D	3:31
13.	"Jantoto" (featuring Olamide)	Alade; Olamide Adedeji	2Kriss; Young D	3:59
14.	"Stronger"	Alade; Geniuzz	Echo	3:34

Black Magic – Bonus track
No.	Title	Writer(s)	Producer(s)	Length
15.	"Knack Am"	Alade; Klem	DJ Coublon	3:34

Black Magic – Deluxe edition
No.	Title	Writer(s)	Producer(s)	Length
16.	"Wiggle"	Alade		3:38
17.	"Right Now" (featuring Kat DeLuna)	Alade; Kathleen Deluna		3:31
18.	"Calé" (featuring Awilo Longomba)	Alade; Awilo Longomba		3:38
19.	"Go Down"	Alade	Philkeyz	3:45
Total length:				63:00

== Personnel ==
Credits adapted from the album's back cover.

- Yemi Alade – primary artist, writing
- Koribo Harrison – executive producer
- Taiye Aliyu – executive producer
- Henry Enebeli – writing (tracks 1, 9, 10)
- Olamide Adedeji – featured artist, writing (track 13)
- Geniuzz – writing (track 14)
- Klem – writing (track 15)
- Young D – production (tracks 1, 12, 13)
- Sarz – production (track 2)
- Philkeyz – production (tracks 3, 11, 19)
- IAmBeat – production (tracks 4, 6)
- Vtek – production, mastering (all tracks except 13)
- Fliptyce – production (track 7)
- Sess – production (tracks 8, 9)
- Krizbeatz – production (track 10)
- 2Kriss – production (track 13)
- Echo – production (track 14)
- DJ Coublon – production (track 15)
- Fiokee – guitar (tracks 10, 13, 15)
- Guitar Prince – guitar (track 4)
- Olaitan Dada – mixing (all tracks except 13)
- Swaps – mixing, mastering (track 13)

== Release history ==
Region	Date	Version	Format	Label
Various	December 15, 2017	Standard	CD; digital download	Effyzzie Music Group
