= Rudykillus =

2021 studio album by Rudeboy

Studio album by Rudeboy
- Released: 5 August 2021
- Genre: Afrobeats; afropop; reggae
- Length: 57:06
- Language: English; Igbo; Nigerian Pidgin
- Label: Fire Department, Inc.
- Producer: Chris Stringz; Selebobo; Orbeat; LordSky

Rudykillus is the debut solo album by Nigerian singer Rudeboy. It was released on 5 August 2021 by his independent record label, Fire Department, Inc. Supported by the single "Focus", the album runs for 57 minutes and spans twelve tracks, as well as the bonus tracks "Woman", "Audio Money", and "Reason with Me". Its production was handled by Chris Stringz, Selebobo, Orbeat, and LordSky.

== Background ==
Following the split of Nigerian duo P-Square, the twins pursued separate careers, with Peter performing as Mr. P and Paul adopting Rudeboy as his stage name. Rudeboy began releasing solo singles in 2017, with "Nkenji Keke" and "Fire Fire" serving as his debut singles. In the years that followed, he continued releasing music while working on his debut studio album. He announced Rudykillus in July 2021, posting the track list to his Instagram. In an interview with Toolz and Nadine of Beat FM, Rudeboy said the album's title was inspired by what his fans say to hype him up whenever he releases new music.

== Singles ==
"Focus" was released the album's only single on 23 July 2021. Produced by Chris Stringz and Rudeboy, the mid-tempo R&B-influenced track sees him express a desire for a drama-free life while pursuing his personal and professional ambitions.

== Critical reception ==
Motolani Alake of Pulse Nigeria rated the album 5.0/10, adding that "across 15 tracks, the album sounds way too familiar. It feels like we've heard it all before." Olalekan Okeremilekun of tooXclusive rated the album 7/10, adding that "many of the songs on this album would have brought out a different taste in sound if there were features on them". Michael Chukwudera of Afrocritik said that Rudykillus is "by no means a poor album, but it is largely formulaic, and places too much reliance on the dexterity of its producers and sound engineers." He concluded that "It fails to serve up any sort of novelty, but it is entertaining nonetheless. We will have to wait for further projects to see if Rudeboy will pull something more spectacular than this," rated it a 6/10.

== Track listing ==
All tracks are written by Paul Okoye.

Rudykillus track listing
| No. | Title | Producer(s) | Length |
|---|---|---|---|
| 1. | "Nowhere to Go" | Chris Stringz; Rudeboy | 3:24 |
| 2. | "Ayoyo" | Chris Stringz; Rudeboy | 3:42 |
| 3. | "Focus" | Chris Stringz; Rudeboy | 3:40 |
| 4. | "Ego Nekwu" | Selebobo; Rudeboy | 5:04 |
| 5. | "Fall in Love" | Chris Stringz; Rudeboy | 4:11 |
| 6. | "Broke Land" | Chris Stringz; Rudeboy | 3:43 |
| 7. | "Something Must Kill a Man" | Chris Stringz; Rudeboy | 3:30 |
| 8. | "Ihe Ne Me" | Chris Stringz; Rudeboy | 3:54 |
| 9. | "Catch Your Fever" | Orbeat; Rudeboy | 4:18 |
| 10. | "4 Days" | Chris Stringz; Rudeboy | 2:53 |
| 11. | "Hey Mama" | Chris Stringz; Rudeboy | 3:56 |
| 12. | "No Gimme Space" | LordSky; Rudeboy | 3:17 |

All tracks are written by Paul Okoye.

Bonus tracks
| No. | Title | Producer(s) | Length |
|---|---|---|---|
| 13. | "Woman" | Chris Stringz; Rudeboy | 3:44 |
| 14. | "Audio Money" | LordSky; Rudeboy | 3:45 |
| 15. | "Reason with Me" | LordSky; Rudeboy | 4:12 |
| Total length: | | | 57:00 |
