= Johnny (Yemi Alade song) =

Single by Yemi Alade

from the album King of Queens
- Released: 14 October 2013
- Genre: Afropop; highlife
- Length: 3:54
- Label: Effyzzie
- Songwriter: Yemi Alade
- Producer: Selebobo

Yemi Alade singles chronology
"Ghen Ghen Love" (2013)	"Johnny" (2013)	"Tangerine" (2014)

Music video
- "Johnny" on YouTube

"Johnny" is a song recorded by Nigerian singer Yemi Alade. It was released on 14 October 2013 as the lead single from her debut studio album King of Queens (2014). The song was a hit in several countries, including Nigeria, Tanzania, Kenya, Zambia, Ghana, South Africa, Liberia, Uganda, and Zimbabwe. The music video was directed by Clarence Peters and shows how the title character, "Johnny", cheats and lies about his relationship with several women in the clip. As of 2026, the video has over 187 million views on video sharing website YouTube. "Johnny" was leaked over the internet prior to its official release. In August 2025, Billboard ranked "Johnny" #15 on their list of the 50 Best Afrobeats Songs of All Time.

== Background ==
Yemi Alade recorded "Johnny" in Enugu while on a nationwide media tour. The song tells the story of a cheating lover and was inspired by a real-life experience she unintentionally wrote during the recording session.

== Music video ==
The official music video for "Johnny" was released on 4 March 2014, premiering on Vevo and her official YouTube channel. Directed by Clarence Peters, it opens with a skit from comedian Bovi (later included as the first track off her debut album King of Queens), playing a reality show host that exposes unfaithful partners. It follows Yemi Alade as she discovers that her lover, Johnny, played by Nigerian actor and model Alexx Ekubo, has been cheating on her with multiple women, portrayed by Beverly Osu, Saeon, and Ajemina, among others. The video also includes cameo appearances from Dil, Selebobo, and more. In January 2019, the video surpassed 100 milion views on YouTube.

== Accolades ==
Year	Awards ceremony	Award description(s)	Results
2014	The Headies	Best Pop Single	Nominated
2014	The Headies	Song of the Year	Nominated
2014	Nigerian Music Video Awards	Best Indigenous Concept	Won
2014	Nigerian Music Video Awards	Video of the Year	Nominated
2014	Nigerian Music Video Awards	Best Pop Extra Video	Nominated
2015	MTV Africa Music Awards	Song of the Year	Nominated
2015	COSON Song Awards	Hottest Song on the Street	Nominated
