= Yemi Alade =

Nigerian singer and songwriter (born 1989)

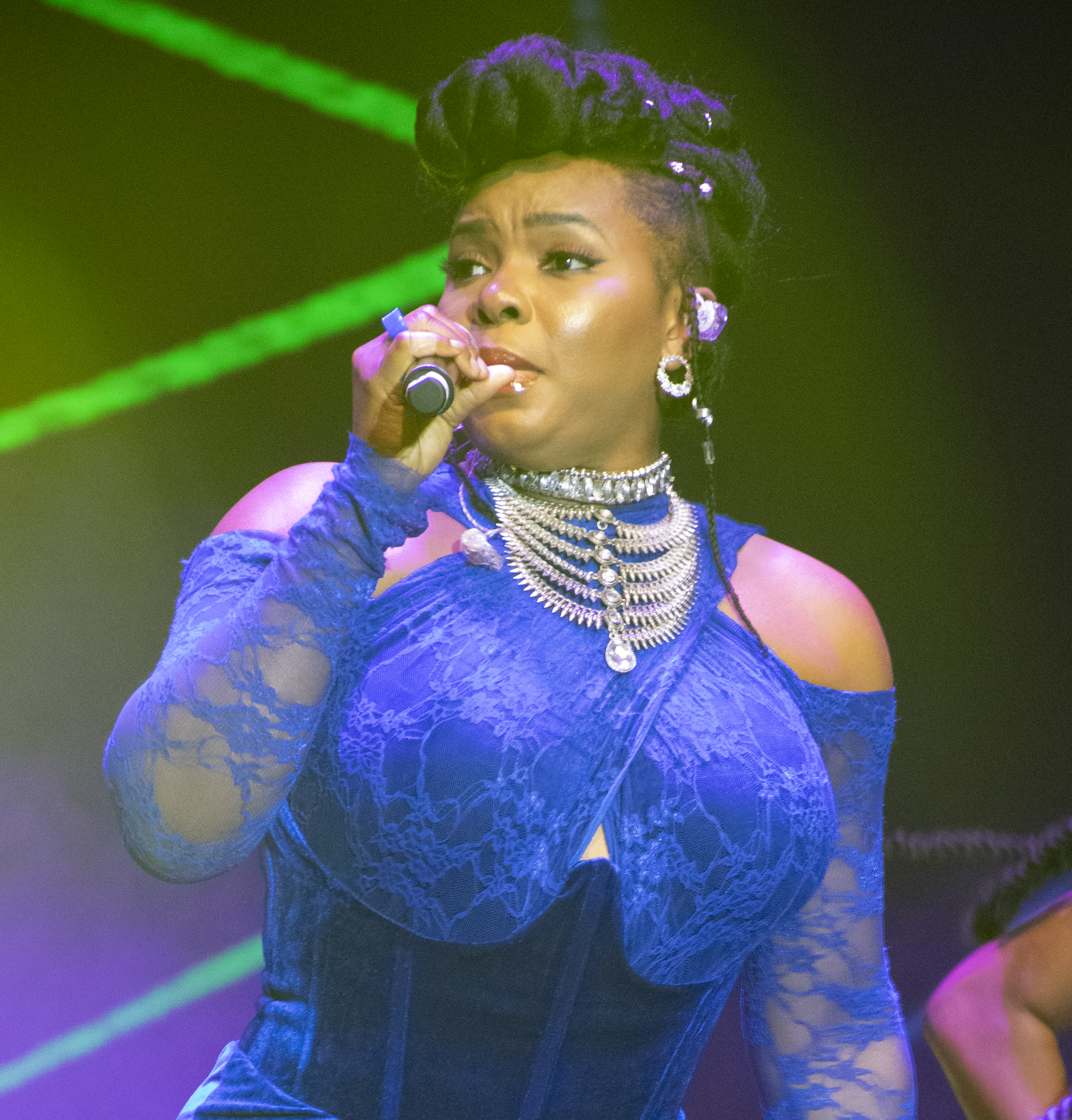
- Alade in 2024
- Born: Yemi Eberechi Alade; 13 March 1989 (age 37)
- Education: University of Lagos
- Occupations: Singer; songwriter; actress; activist
- Awards: Full list
- Musical career
- Born: Ondo State, Nigeria
- Genres: Afropop; R&B; world
- Instrument: Vocals
- Years active: 2005–present
- Labels: Effyzzie Music Group; Rebel Movement; Universal Music Africa
- Website: yemialadeofficial.com

Yemi Eberechi Alade (born 13 March 1989), known professionally as Yemi Alade, is a Nigerian singer, songwriter, actress and activist from the Akoko part of Ondo State. Her music is a mixture of Afropop, highlife, dancehall, pop and R&B, and has been of influence in several countries across Africa. She sings in English, Igbo, Pidgin, Yoruba, French, Swahili and Portuguese.

Alade won the Peak Talent Show in 2009 after which she signed to Effyzzie Music Group, and had a hit with her single "Johnny" in 2014. Following the releases of her albums King of Queens and Mama Africa, Alade embarked on world tours consecutively. In 2016, she debuted on Billboard at No 4 on the Next Big Sound Chart She won the MTV African Music Awards for Best female in 2015 and 2016 consecutively and was nominated for Artiste of the Year in 2015, making her the first female to win the MAMAs for Best female consecutively twice and nominated for Artiste of the Year. In 2015, Alade was the first African female to be nominated for the MTV Europe Music Awards (EMAs) and she was nominated for the BET awards for Best International Act: Africa in 2015 and 2016. Alade is also applauded for her creative and overwhelming stage performances, fashion and music videos, She has won The Headies Award for Best Performer twice, in 2018 and 2019. The slot was initiated at The Headies 2018 and she was the first artiste to win the category.

Alade is also the second Nigerian and Afrobeats artist and the first female to hit 100 million views for a single video on YouTube after Davido. Alade's song "Tomorrow"- the lead single from her sixth studio album Rebel Queen, earned her first Grammy nomination, it received a nomination at the 67th Annual Grammy Awards for Best African Music Performance.

== Early life ==
Alade was raised in a multi-ethnic home from Nigeria, Her father James Alade was a commissioner of police from Ondo State, the southwestern region of Nigeria while her mother Helen Uzoma is a native of Abia State, the southeastern region of Nigeria. According to Alade, she taps from the Igbo and Yoruba ethnicities of her parents. Alade attended secondary school at Victory Grammar School, Ikeja, and the University of Lagos, (both in Lagos State, Nigeria)

During her university education, Alade participated in a TV talent show called Peak Talent Show, where she emerged as the winner. That was Alade's debut appearance on TV, and she gained popularity. She was then signed to Effyzzie Music Group.

== Music career ==
=== 2014–2016: King of Queens and Mama Africa ===
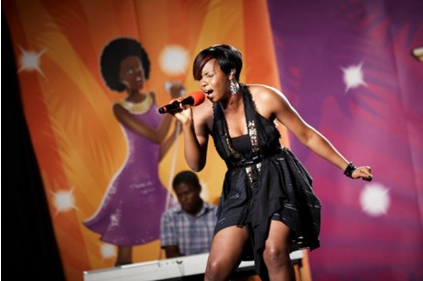
Yemi Alade performing in the Peak Talent Show, 2009

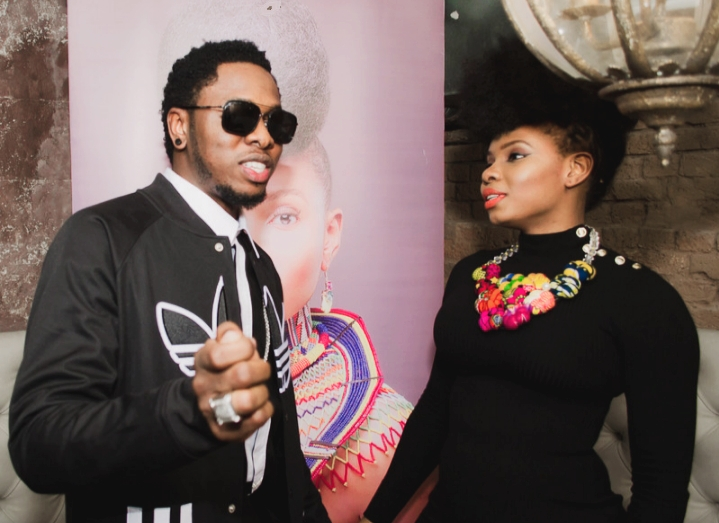
Yemi Alade and Runtown at the Mama Africa (album) listening party, London

Alade's debut studio album King of Queens was released on 2 October 2014. Alade collaborated with producers such as Selebobo, Sizzle Pro, Shady Bizniz, Philkeyz, Young D, GospelOnDeBeatz, DIL, OJB Jezreel, Mr Chidoo, Fliptyce, EL Mcee and Beat Nation. The album was preceded by the singles "Johnny", "Tangerine" and "Kissing". It features guest appearances and skits from Bovi, R2Bees, Phyno, Chidinma, DIL, Selebobo and Diamond Platnumz. Alade promoted the album by touring several African countries, including Ghana, Kenya and South Africa. The album's deluxe edition was released in November 2014; it contains French versions of songs originally performed in English. The cover art for the deluxe edition was unveiled on 21 October 2014. According to the music platform A Nation of Billions, King of Queens sold over 100,000 copies. The album was nominated for Album of the year at the 2015 Nigerian Entertainment Awards and the 2015 Headies Awards.

Alade's second studio album Mama Africa was released on 25 March 2016. Alade disclosed its title was Mama Africa and said it would focus on the strengths and weaknesses of an African woman. The album combines elements of Afropop, highlife, R&B, coupé-décalé, hip-hop and pop. Alade said recording the album was a struggle because she was constantly traveling to different countries every day. She also said she recorded the album to "capture all of Africa in one CD". Alade told The Fader magazine she collaborated with artists from West Africa, East Africa and South Africa. She enlisted GospelOnDeBeatz, DJ Coublon, Selebobo, Philkeyz, BeatsByEmzo, Masterkraft, Rotimi Keys and Mr. Chidoo to produce the album. Mama Africa features guest appearances from P-Square, Sarkodie, Sauti Sol, Flavour N'abania, Rotimi Keys, DJ Arafat and Selebobo. It was made available for pre-order on iTunes a week before its official release. Alade announced that proceeds from the sale of the album will go to the Feed a Child charity initiative. The album's deluxe edition was released on 6 April 2016, and features collaborations with South African musicians Bucie and AKA. Mama Africa charted in Germany, Malaysia and France.

Mama Africa won the World Beat Album on the 2016 Independent Music Awards.

=== 2017–2019: Black Magic, Woman of Steel, Universal Music and Endorsements ===
"Woman of Steel is all about drawing the inner strength that you have in you and being the superhero that you've always needed and part of being as hard as actual iron, is breaking free from the confines of having to be exceptionally "tough" all the time and feeling free to tap into womanly instincts. It's about finding power in various expressions of womanhood: hard, soft, or otherwise."

— Yemi Alade speaking about Woman of Steel, OkayAfrica

Alade's third studio album Black Magic was released on 15 December 2017. A follow-up to her 2017 EP Mama Afrique, the album features guest appearances from Falz and Olamide. Black Magic was made available for pre-order in November 2017. Prior to disclosing the album's title, Alade posted the acronym BM on social media and wanted her fans to guess its meaning. The album was produced by DJ Coublon, Vtek, Sarz, Krizbeatz, Young D, Sess, Fliptyce, IAmBeat, Philkeyz, 2Kriss and Echo. It was supported by the previously released singles "Knack Am", "Single & Searching" and "Heart Robber". The album received generally negative reviews from music critics, who panned its lyrics and Alade's songwriting. Prior to that, on 9 May 2017, Alade was announced as a coach in the second edition of The Voice Nigeria to replace 2baba who was a former coach on the live show. She coached on The Voice Nigeria (Season 2) alongside other Nigerian artists like Waje, Timi Dakolo and Patoranking.

On 1 December 2017, Alade was featured on a campaign "Make The Future" by Shell Oil Company in Nigeria. She was also starred in the company's music video "On Top of the World" which also featured Jennifer Hudson, Pixie Lott, Luan Santana and Monali Thakur.

On 29 April 2019, Alade garnered one million views on her "Oh My Gosh" remix featuring Rick Ross in one day. This makes the release from Alade, one of the fastest views gainers in the history of African music and the fastest release by an African female act. In July 2019, Alade became the first African female artist to reach one million subscribers on YouTube. Her song "Johnny" currently holds the YouTube record for the most watched African Female music video of all time. Alade was featured on "Don't Jealous Me", a track from Beyoncé's soundtrack album The Lion King: The Gift. She appeared on the track alongside Mr Eazi and Tekno. Rolling Stone magazine revealed that Alade also recorded a verse for an earlier version of "My Power" in June.

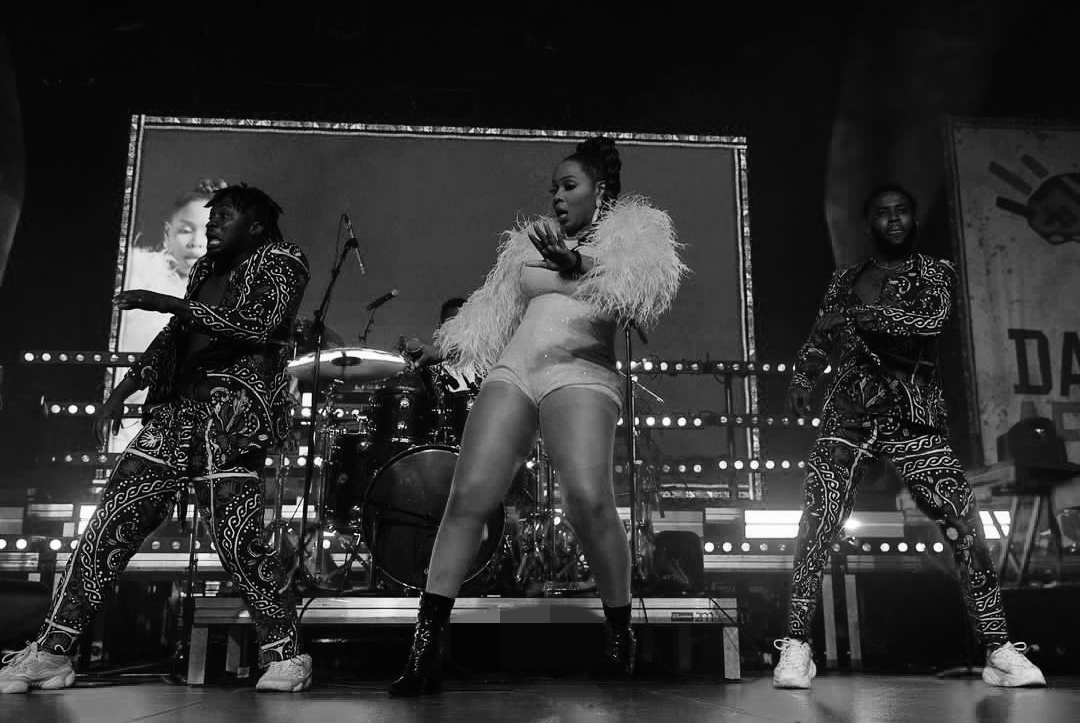
Yemi Alade performing in Sydney during her Woman of Steel tour

Alade released her fourth studio album Woman of Steel on 30 August 2019. Alade describes the album as a "buffet with different kinds of meals and drinks". She named the album Woman of Steel to reflect her tough veneer to command the same degree of respect as her male counterparts. Moreover, she derived the title after coming to the realization that she is her superhero. Musically, Woman of Steel is an Afrobeat record that incorporates elements of R&B and highlife. The album primarily explores topics such as love, socio-politics and poverty. Alade spent three years recording the album and said it would be released on 30 August 2019. The album's cover art features Alade wearing a headcap inspired by the Nefertiti Bust artwork. Artists featured on Woman of Steel include Rick Ross, Duncan Mighty, Angélique Kidjo and Funke Akindele. In an interview with The Star newspaper, Alade sang some of the songs that made the album were recorded the previous year while others were recorded in August.

In September 2019, Alade signed a multi-year licensing deal with Universal Music Africa (UMA) and UMG France. UMA will serve as Alade's exclusive worldwide record partner, while UMG France will serve as the international rollout partner for all of her releases under the label.

Over the years, Alade received multiple ambassadorial contracts and partnerships from different brands both locally and internationally. She was endorsed by brands like Luc Belaire, Glo, Maybelline, Shell and many more.

=== 2020-2022: Black Is King, Empress and Latin Grammy ===
On 16 January 2020, Alade was announced the new brand ambassador for Hollandia Yoghurt.

Alade starred on Beyoncé's Black Is King visual trailer and was featured in the movie released and premiered on Disney+ on 31 July 2020, then premiered for African countries on DStv Mnet on 1 August 2020.

On 9 June 2020, Alade was mentioned to be among the forefront artists/musicians from across the world to perform at The Global Goal: Unite for our future sponsored by the Global Citizen aimed to highlight the disproportionate impact of the COVID-19 pandemic especially in the most remote places in Africa and across the world. On 27 June 2020, Alade performed in the Global Goal: Unite for Our future alongside Miley Cyrus, Shakira, J Balvin, Jennifer Hudson, Coldplay, Usher, Justin Bieber, Quavo, Christine and the Queens and Chloe X Halle.

On 25 August 2020, Alade was announced to be among the coaches participating in The Voice Nigeria Season 3 alongside Waje, Darey and Falz, Alade is also one of the returning coaches from The Voice Nigeria (Season 2) alongside Waje

On 17 November 2020, Alade announced the release of her fifth studio album titled Empress. She released the tracklist and the cover art of the album and slated the release for 20 November 2020. The album contains 15 tracks and it features guest appearances and collaborations from the Grammy award-winning Estelle, Vegedream, Patoranking, Rudeboy, Mzansi Youth Choir and Dadju. She also enlisted Vtek, Phil Keyz, Egar Boi, Dr. Amir, Krizbeatz, IamBeatz, Youp Boelen, Jimmy Huru and Yung Felix as producers of the album. The guitarists she likewise enlisted are Fiokee and Max Meurs. The album received positive critical acclaim and has the most singles of all Alade's album. On 13 August 2021, Alade released her second EP Queendoncom with seven singles. It was an all solo album as Alade featured no guest appearances on the project. She subsequently released another EP in 2022 titled African Baddie, this project featured guest appearances from Bisa Kdei. In 2022, Yemi Alade bagged a Grammy nomination for her song "Dignity" with Angelique Kidjo. She alongside Kidjo were nominated for the category of Best Song for Social Change Social Merit Award. She likewise has a Grammy certificate for her collaboration with Beninese music icon, Angelique Kidjo on her Mother Nature album. She is also the first afrobeat artiste to get a Latin Grammy nomination for the song "Cónexion Total" with Bomba Estéreo. Both the song and (Deja) the album it featured in were nominated for the awards. In 2022, The Scoove Africa ranked Yemi Alade "The Best Stage Performer in Nigeria" for the year 2022. Emma Dabiri, in an article published on Norient, named Alade as a revolutionary artist "simply rediscovering some of the freedoms to which colonialism and its immediate legacy once barred them access".

=== 2023-2025: AFCON, Rebel Queen and Grammy nomination ===
On 13 October 2023, Alade was featured alongside Magic System and Mohamed Ramadan on a soundtrack "Akwaba" which was to be used as the official 2023 AFCON theme song. "Akwaba" is a word which means "Welcome" in a native Ivorian language of Baoulé.

Later in 2023, Alade released Mamapiano, a four track Amapiano influenced EP featuring Ajebo Hustlers.

On 14 January 2024, Yemi Alade alongside other featured artistes performed the song "Akwaba" for the 2023 African Cup of Nations opening held in Stade Olympique Alessane Ouattara in Abidjan, Côte d'Ivoire. Alade received generally positive reviews and accolades for her outstanding performance during the opening ceremony.

On 8 November 2024, Alade was announced as a nominee of the 67th Annual Grammy Awards. She earned this nomination for her song "Tomorrow" on the category for Best African Music Performance. According to the recording academy, Alade asserts unflappable confidence and self-belief in the amapiano track from her Rebel Queen album.

In April 2025 it was revealed that she sang the opening song, entitled "You Are," for the animated series, Iyanu, which she aimed to keep authentic to "Nigerian culture and Yoruba mythology," with her song described as a "soaring anthem of identity" which echoed the "power of African storytelling through music."

== Advocacy ==
Alade has engaged in advocacy programs over the years of her music career.

On 7 November 2018, Alade visited her secondary school Victory Grammar School, Ikeja where she also engaged in charity work. She helped the students who had difficulty in their eyesight with equipment to help them see clearly. She engaged in this through her foundation (Helen and James Pathway Foundation).

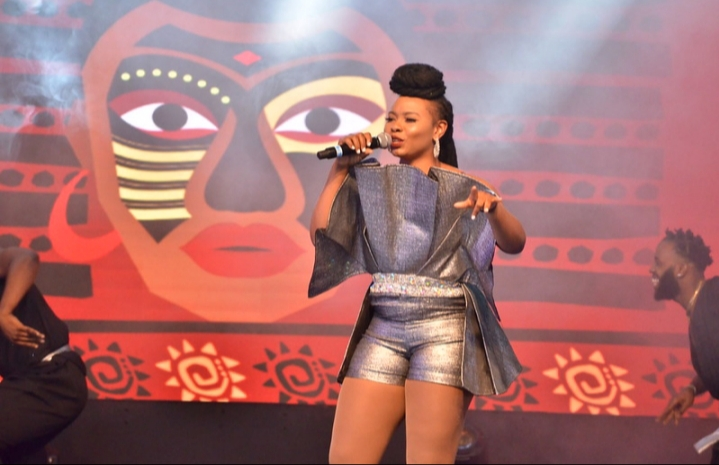
Yemi Alade performs at the Nairobi Summit on ICPD25, 2019

On 15 November 2019, Alade was featured on The Nairobi Summit on ICPD25 for the movement "A Global Call to Action" for handicapped children in Kenya. She performed alongside Chawki

In 2020, Alade joined the United Nations Development Programme to speak for the protection and aiding of poor people across Africa affected by the corona virus pandemic. She also was featured in the campaign Unite for the Future by Global Citizen In partnership with Nelson Mandela Foundation and MTV Base, Alade joined One Campaign on a movement "Stand Together against Covid-19" She was featured on the campaign song "Stand Together" which collaborated with other African artistes like 2Baba, Ahmed Soultan, Ben Pol, Teni, Amanda Black, Stanley Enow, Gigi La Mayne, Prodigio and Betty G

On 23 September 2020, Alade was appointed a goodwill ambassador for the United Nations Development Programme (UNDP) by the organization's administrator Achim Steiner. She pledged with the UNDP that her focus on Sustainable Development Goals would be on inequality, empowering women and creating awareness for the impact of global climate change. On 30 October 2020, Alade performed her singles "True Love" and "Africa" at the TED virtual countdown global launch. The countdown is TED's initiative to accelerate solutions to climate crises around the world. Before her performance, Alade spoke about being part of the community that challenges one another to find ways to reduce carbon emissions globally.

Ever since Alade's appointment as a United Nations Development Programme ambassador, her activism for the Sustainable Development Goals has increased as she has engaged in programmes and events that will help posit change to a better environment and gender based violence.

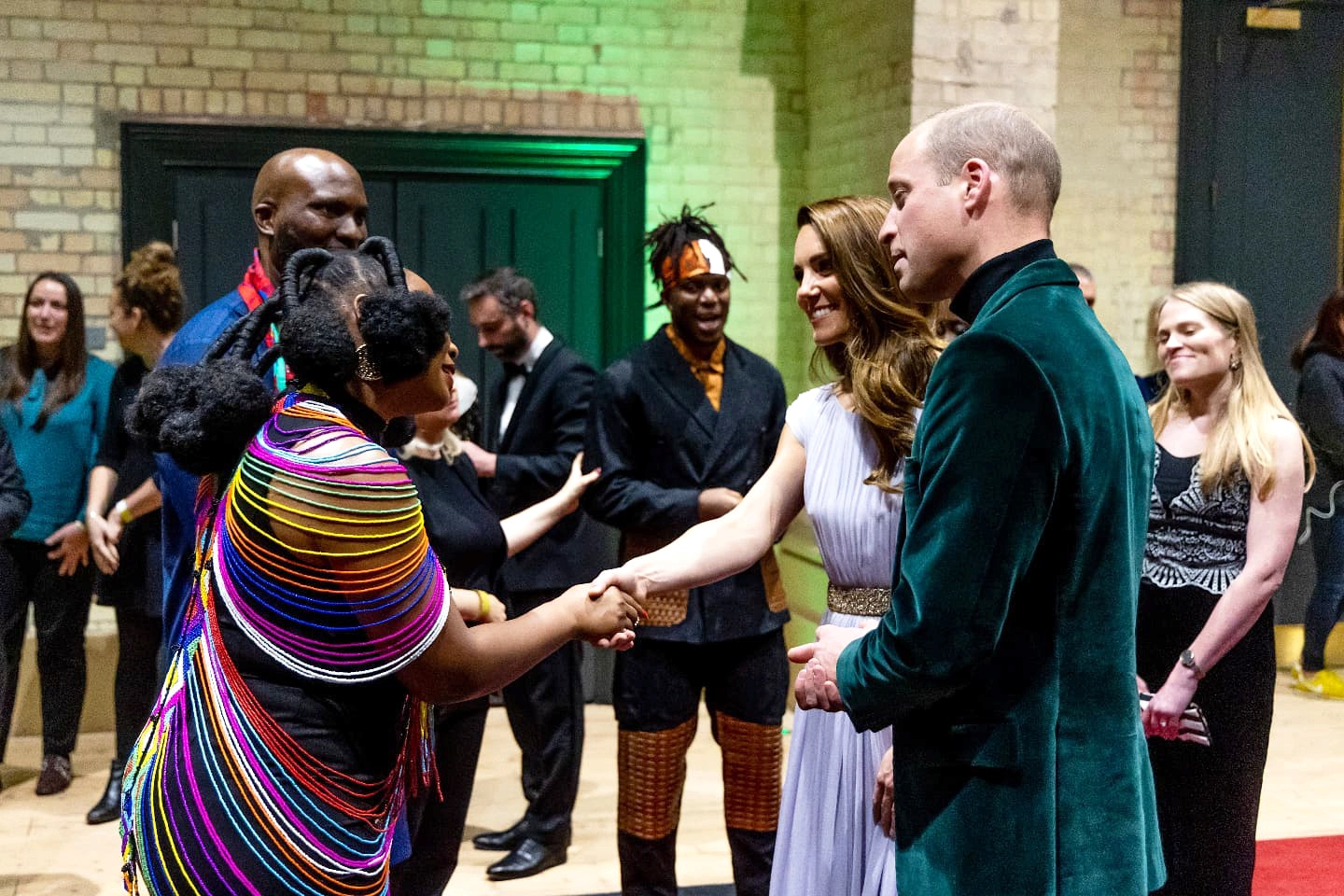
Yemi Alade with Prince William, then Duke and Duchess of Cambridge

On 17 October 2021, Alade performed at the maiden Earthshot Prize ceremony which took place at the Alexandra Palace, London at the invitation of the Royal family (The Duke and Duchess of Cambridge). The event is hosted by the Royal foundation and aimed to distribute prizes and awards to five individuals each year who help the environment substantially. Alade performed alongside Ed Sheeran, Shawn Mendes, Coldplay and KSI. According to Alade, The Royal family personally selected her song "Rain" to be performed at the event.

On 2 March 2022, Alade was announced as the global ambassador of a Pan-African campaign called "It's Up To Us" in partnership with the Africa Centre For Disease Control and the MasterCard Foundation to encourage Africans get vaccinated against COVID-19.

== Legacy ==
In 2018, Alade was named to the Forbes 30 under 30 list. This honours her as one of the thirty young creative leaders and entrepreneurs in the African continent. She also made the list for Avance media's 100 most influential African women in 2020. Yemi Alade has also been mentioned by many artists like Tems, Ayra Starr, Guchi, Ugoccie and Busiswa as an inspiration, mentor and role model.

== Discography ==
Studio albums

- King of Queens (2014)
- Mama Africa (2016)
- Black Magic (2017)
- Woman of Steel (2019)
- Empress (2020)
- Rebel Queen (2024)
- It's Yemi Alade (2026)

== Filmography ==
=== Film ===
Year	Title	Role	Director	Ref
2019	Home	Nneka	Clarence Peters	
2020	Black Is King	Yemi Alade	Beyoncé	
2020	Omo Ghetto: The Saga	Mogambo	Funke Akindele-Bello	

=== Television ===
Year	Title	Role	Notes	Ref
2017	The Voice Nigeria	Coach	Replaced 2baba as coach from season 1	
2020	The Voice Nigeria	Coach	Returns as coach for season 3	

== Tours ==
- King of Queens Tour
- Mama Africa Tour
- Black Magic Tour
- Woman of Steel Tour
- Empress Tour

== See also ==
- List of awards and nominations received by Yemi Alade
- List of Nigerian musicians
