= Woman of Steel (album) =

Studio album by Yemi Alade
- Released: 30 August 2019
- Recorded: 2018–2019
- Genre: Afrobeats; Afropop; Afro-life
- Length: 52:00
- Label: Effyzzie; Rebel Movement
- Producer: Krizbeatz; DJ Coublon; Rotimi Keys; Vtek; Yung Willis; Egar Boi

Yemi Alade chronology
Black Magic (2017)	Woman of Steel (2019)	Empress (2020)

Singles from Woman of Steel
- 1. "Home" Released: 21 August 2019; 2. "Give Dem" Released: 21 August 2019; 3. "Vibe" Released: 28 October 2019; 4. "Shake" Released: 20 November 2019; 5. "Remind You" Released: 22 January 2020; 6. "Shekere" Released: 5 February 2020

Woman of Steel is the fourth studio album by Nigerian singer Yemi Alade. It was released on 30 August 2019, through Effyzzie Music Group and Rebel Movement. Described by Alade as a "buffet with different kinds of meals and drinks", Woman of Steel represents a thematic and personal shift in her sound. Musically, it is an Afrobeats album that explores musical styles such as Afropop and Afro-life. Woman of Steel features collaborations with Rick Ross, Duncan Mighty, Angélique Kidjo, and Funke Akindele. It was supported by the singles "Home", "Give Dem", "Vibe", "Shake", "Remind You", and "Shekere". Although critical reception to Woman of Steel was mixed, the album was considered to be Alade's best album yet.

== Background and promotion ==
Woman of Steel primarily explores topics such as love, socio-politics, and anti-poverty. Alade spent three years recording the album and said it would be released on 30 August 2019. Musically, Woman of Steel is an Afrobeats record that explores musical styles such as Afropop and Afro-life. Alade describes the album as a "buffet with different kinds of meals and drinks" and named it Woman of Steel to project a tough exterior and earn the same level of respect as her male peers. She derived the title after realising she is her own superhero. The album's cover art features Alade wearing a headcap inspired by the Nefertiti Bust artwork. Artists featured on Woman of Steel include Rick Ross, Duncan Mighty, Angélique Kidjo, and Funke Akindele. In an interview with The Star newspaper, Alade said some of the songs that made the album were recorded the previous year, while others were recorded in August 2019.

Alade launched and promoted the album in Lagos, Paris, London, New York, and Nairobi. The Lagos edition of the launch party was held at the IMAX Theatre in Lagos; celebrities such as Denrele Edun, Dat Warri Girl, Illbliss, and DJ Sose were all present at the event. The launch party in Kenya was held at the Blue Door Restaurant and Lounge in Westlands, Nairobi. Celebrities who attended the event include Chimano, Musyoka, Nadia Mukami, Naiboi, Patricia Kihoro, and Victoria Kimani. Alade launched the album in Kenya because she considers Nairobi to be her second home. In October 2019, Alade submitted the album to The Recording Academy for consideration in the Best World Music Album category at the 62nd Annual Grammy Awards.

=== Singles ===
The album's lead single, "Home", was released on 21 August 2019. Its production incorporates elements of fuji music and live instrumentation. Alade released a music video and a short film to support the song's release. The video for "Home", which was directed by Alade's frequent collaborator Clarence Peters, features scenes of her dancing and wearing African clothing. The short film that accompanied the song's release was written and directed by Peters. The film depicts a love story between Nneka (Alade) and Austine (Frankincense Eche-Ben). In the film, Nneka reunites with Austin after fleeing her abusive grandmother.

The Krizbeatz-produced track "Give Dem" was also released on 21 August 2019, as the album's second single. The accompanying video for "Give Dem" was directed by Clarence Peters and contains various dance styles. The album's third single, "Vibe", was released on 28 October 2019. In the song's music video, Alade references her lustful cravings and demands affection from her romantic partner. The Native's Dennis Peter described the video for "Vibe" as a "collage of bright, sun-soaked shots that capture the singer at her usual, exuberant best." The Duncan Mighty-assisted track "Shake" was released on 20 November 2019, as the album's fourth single. The music video for the song was filmed by Paul Gambit. In the video, Alade displays her sensual side by dancing and posing on a bed while wearing a mesh gown.

The album's fifth single, "Remind You", was released on 22 January 2020. The accompanying music video for the song was directed by Ovie Etseyatse; in it, Alade dressed sensuously for her love interest Djimon Hounsou. The album's sixth single, "Shekere", which was released on 5 February 2020, features vocals by Beninese singer Angélique Kidjo and interpolates her 1996 classic "Wombo Lombo". Alade spent three years working on the song and was in contact with Kidjo's brother prior to meeting her. The visuals for "Shekere" were directed by Ovie Etseyatse and highlight various African cultural dances, including the Maasai jumping dance. In the video, Alade is seen in a variety of beaded ensembles and Ankara prints while Kidjo wears a Zulu headdress.

On 30 April 2019, Alade released the remix of "Oh My Gosh", which features a rap verse by American rapper Rick Ross and is a slight departure from her usual sound. The song's accompanying music video was directed by Ryan Snyder; in it, Alade and Rick Ross are surrounded by dancers in vibrant costumes, led by Izzy Odigie.

== Composition ==
On the album's opening track, "Home", which is reminiscent of church music, Alade expresses her gratitude for her romantic partner. The mid-tempo track "Give Dem" contains Latin strings and an Afrobeats-infused percussion; the song takes a showy route. In "Vibe", Alade portrays herself as a sexually liberated woman; this is exemplified by lyrics like "I want a boy wey go love me scatter, wey nor go knock before e enter, wey go love me pass him sister, give me brain make I mental". In "Night and Day", she incorporates guitar melodies found in Soukous music.

The nostalgic track "Shekere" is a remake of Angélique Kidjo's "Wombo Lombo". The reggae track "CIA (Criminal in Agbada)" tackles political corruption. The romantic ballad "Remind You" contains lyrics recorded entirely in conventional English. In the Igbo highlife track "Yeba", Alade speaks about rejecting marriage proposals from two broke men. The Duncan Mighty-assisted track "Shake" has a dancehall feel and is reminiscent of Tekno's "Pana". In the R&B and Afrobeats-infused track "Lai Lai", Alade is accepting of her love interest despite his account balance. In the pro-wealth track "Poverty", Alade denounces poverty and endorses wealth. She enlisted Kenyan singer Ivlyn Mutua to translate the song into Swahili. "Nobody" draws comparisons to Wizkid's "Sweet Love".

== Critical reception ==
Professional ratings
Review scores
Source	Rating
TooXclusive	8/10
Pulse Nigeria	6.9/10

Woman of Steel received mixed reviews from music critics. Pulse Nigeria's Motolani Alake awarded the album a rating of 6.9 out of 10, praising Alade's songwriting skills and commending her for "addressing a myriad of topics" on the project. Alake also opined that the album is Alade's best album yet. Mide Michael of TooXclusive did a track-by-track review of the album and granted it 8 out of 10; Michael also considers the album to be Alade's best album yet.

Writing for The Lagos Review, Dami Ajayi said the album "reminds us of Alade's magic, which she hasn't used adequately in the past four years".

== Track listing ==
Credits adapted from AllMusic and other publications.

Woman of Steel – Standard edition
No.	Title	Writer(s)	Producer(s)	Length
1.	"Night and Day"	Yemi Eberechi Alade; Segun Ajayi	Mystro	3:21
2.	"Home"	Alade; Victor Kpoudosu	Vtek	3:44
3.	"Shake" (featuring Duncan Mighty)	Alade; Duncan Okechukwu; Ernest Itiveh	Egar Boi	3:14
4.	"Give Dem"	Alade; Chris Sunday	Krizbeatz	3:32
5.	"Vibe"	Alade; Itiveh	Egar Boi	3:11
6.	"Yeba"	Alade; Daniel Shekwoyemi	Yung Willis	3:24
7.	"Remind You"	Alade; Kpoudosu	Vtek	3:00
8.	"Nobody"	Alade; Sunday	Krizbeatz	3:26
9.	"Shekere" (featuring Angélique Kidjo)	Alade; Angélique Kidjo; Charles Ugo	DJ Coublon	3:06
10.	"Poverty" (featuring Funke Akindele)	Alade; Funke Akindele; Kpoudosu	Vtek	4:03
11.	"Lai Lai"	Alade; Rotimi Akinfenwa	Rotimi Keys	3:30
12.	"Somto"	Alade; Shekwoyemi	Yung Willis	3:32
13.	"CIA (Criminal in Agbada)"	Alade; Kpoudosu	Vtek	4:04

Woman of Steel – Bonus tracks
No.	Title	Writer(s)	Producer(s)	Length
14.	"Poverty (Swahili Version)" (featuring Funke Akindele)	Alade; Akindele; Kpoudosu	Vtek	4:03
15.	"Oh My Gosh (Remix)" (featuring Rick Ross)	Alade; William Roberts II	DJ Coublon	3:18
Total length:				52:00

Notes

- "Shekere" interpolates Angélique Kidjo's "Wombo Lombo".

== Personnel ==
Credits adapted from the album's back cover and AllMusic.

- Yemi Alade – primary artist, composer, executive producer
- Koribo Harrison – executive producer
- Taiye Aliyu – executive producer
- Segun Ajayi – composer
- Rotimi Akinfenwa – composer, production (track 11)
- Ernest Itiveh – composer, production (tracks 3, 5)
- Victor Kpoudosu – composer, production (tracks 2, 7, 10, 13, 14)
- Daniel Shekwoyemi – composer, production (tracks 6, 12)
- Chris Sunday – composer, production (tracks 4, 8)
- Charles Ugo – composer, production (tracks 9, 15)
- Funke Akindele – featured artist
- Angélique Kidjo – featured artist
- Duncan Mighty – featured artist
- Rick Ross – featured artist
- Adesope Olajide – A&R

== Release history ==
Region	Date	Version	Format	Label
Various	30 August 2019	Standard	CD; digital download	Effyzzie Music Group; Rebel Movement
