= Shekere (song) =

Song by Yemi Alade featuring Angélique Kidjo

from the album Woman of Steel
- Released: August 30, 2019
- Genre: Afro pop
- Length: 3:06
- Label: Effyzzie Music Group; Universal Music Africa
- Songwriter: Yemi Alade
- Producer: DJ Coublon

Yemi Alade chronology
"Nobody" (2019)	"Shekere" (2019)	"Poverty" (2019)

Music video
- "Shekere" on YouTube

"Shekere" is a song recorded by the Nigerian Afro pop artist Yemi Alade and produced by DJ Coublon, taken from her studio album Woman of Steel (2019). Alade collaborated with the Beninese artiste Angélique Kidjo on the track.

== Background ==
In an interview with OkayAfrica, Alade stated that Kidjo had been an inspiration to her while she was growing up. The song took two years to make. The track was produced by DJ Coublon and Kidjo remixed her hit song "Wombo Lombo" on the track.

== Music video ==
The music video was shot in the United Kingdom and Kenya. It featured the Kenyan Maasai tribe, Ushanga women group and dancers. It was directed by Ovie Etseyatse.

== Accolades ==
Year	Nominee / work	Award	Result
2021	"Shekere"	Best Collaboration	Nominated
2020	"Shekere"	Best Music Video	Nominated

== Critical reception ==
A contributor to SoundStroke reviewed "Shekere" and gave it a 7.3/10 rating and applauded the music producer for giving a nice instrumental on the song. The reviewer also stated that "the both artistes delivered so effortlessly as though they have been singing together for years".
