= DJ Coublon =

Nigerian record producer

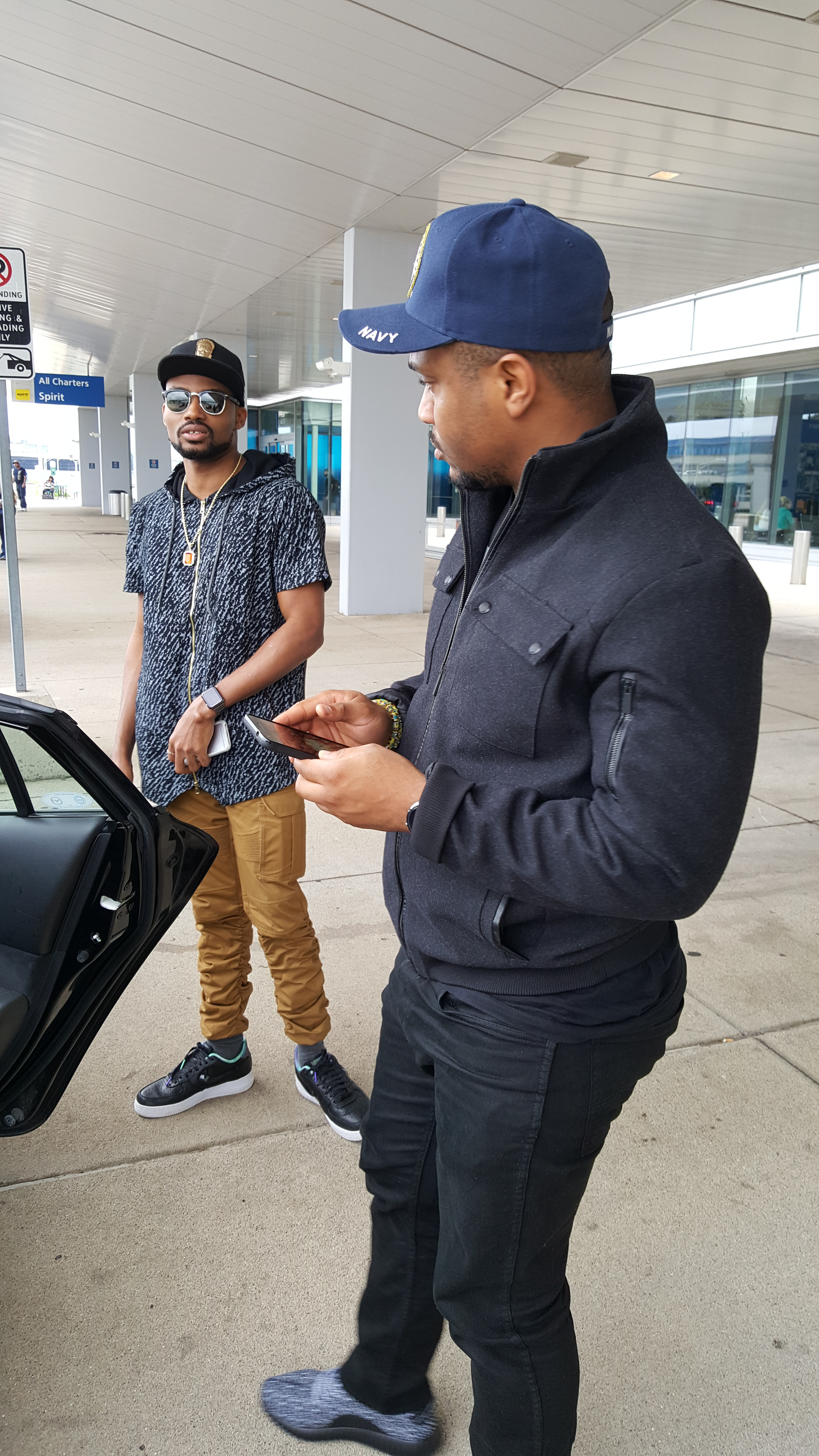
- Coublon in 2019
- Born: Akwuba Charles Ugochukwu; November 4, 1989 (age 37); Akure, Ondo State, Nigeria
- Musical career
- Origin: Anambra State, Anaocha LGA
- Genres: Afro pop; Hip hop; Afrobeats; R&B
- Occupations: Record producer, sound engineer
- Instruments: Piano, bass guitar, keyboard, DAW
- Years active: 2012–present
- Labels: Made Men Music Group (2014-2016); Three Guard Records (2017-present)
- Website: djcoublon.com

Akwuba Charles Ugochukwu (born November 4, 1989), professionally known as DJ Coublon, is a Nigerian record producer and sound engineer. He is best known for producing hit songs with several prominent artists in the Nigerian music industry, including Kizz Daniel, Iyanya, Yemi Alade, Tekno, Patoranking, Seyi Shay, among others.

== Early life and career ==
Born on November 4, 1989, he began his interest in music at the age of 7. He is a graduate of Physics with Electronics from Veritas University in Abuja, the federal capital territory of Nigeria. DJ Coublon began his music career in Onitsha, Anambra State, Southeastern Nigeria. In 2013, he moved to Lagos State, southwest Nigeria where he met other artists like Iyanya and Kiss Daniel. He was signed onto Made Men Music Group between September 2014 to 2016.

== Production credits ==
Year	Month	Artist	Song	Album
2013	Oct	Iyanya	Le Kwa Ukwu	Le Kwa Ukwu - Single
2014				
2014	March	DIL	Pretty Girls ft. Iyanya	Pretty Girls - Single
2014	April	MMMG	Yudala ft. Iyanya, Tekno, Selebobo, Baci & Mystro	Yudala - Single
2014	May	Kiss Daniel	Laye	Laye - Single
2014	May	MMMG	Dreaming ft Iyanya and Emma Nyra	The Evolution
2014	May	Tuti	Aunty Bukky	Aunty Bukky - Single
2014	Aug	Iyanya	Story Story ft. Oritse Femi	Story Story - Single
2014	Aug	B-Red	Iwotago ft Phyno	Iwotago - Single
2014	Sept	Kiss Daniel	Woju	Woju - Single
2014	Sept	Ric Hassani	Double Double	Double Double - Single
2015				
2015	Feb	Axterix	Opeke	Opeke - Single
2015	Feb	Sunny Mackson	Oh Baby ft Mc Galaxy	Oh Baby - Single
2015	March	T Spize	I Miss You	I Miss You - Single
2015	March	Lardy'D	Packaging ft. Reminisce	Packaging - Single
2015	June	Skoolboi	Ezigbonwa	Ezigbonwa - Single
2015	Sept	Iyanya	Applaudise	Applaudise
2015	Sept	Iyanya	Mama	Applaudise
2015	Sept	Iyanya	Macoma ft. Efya x Sarkodie	Applaudise
2015	Sept	Iyanya	Again ft. Seyi Shey	Applaudise
2015	Sept	Iyanya	Mogbe ft. Patoranking	Applaudise
2015	Sept	Iyanya	"Yoga ft. Victoria Kimani"	Applaudise
2015		Tekno Miles	"Duro"	Duro - Single
2015			"Duro Remix"	Duro (Remix) - Single
2015			"Wash"	Wash - Single
2015	Feb	Kiss Daniel	Woju (Remix) [ft. Davido & Tiwa Savage]	Woju (Remix) [feat. Davido & Tiwa Savage] - Single
2015		MC Galaxy	"Hello"	Hello - Single
2015		Patoranking	"My Woman My Everything"	My Woman My Everything - Single
2015		Kiss Daniel	"Woju (Remix) ft. Davido, Tiwa Savage"	Woju (Remix)
2016		Kiss Daniel	"Napo ft. Sugarboy"	New Era
2016		Kiss Daniel	"Good Time"	New Era
2016		Kiss Daniel	"Laye"	New Era
2016		Kiss Daniel	"Are You Alright?"	New Era
2016		Kiss Daniel	"Alone"	New Era
2016		Kiss Daniel	"Duro"	New Era
2016		Kiss Daniel	"Nothing Dey"	New Era
2016		Yemi Alade	"Baby's Back"	Mama Africa
2016		Yemi Alade	"Ferrari"	Mama Africa
2016		Emma Nyra	"Once Chance"	Love Versus Money, Vol 1
2016		Emma Nyra	"Sakarin" ft. Dammy Krane	Love Versus Money, Vol 1
2016		Emma Nyra	"For My Matter" ft. Patoranking	Love Versus Money, Vol 1
2016		Emma Nyra	"For My Matter" ft. Banky W	Love Versus Money, Vol 1
2016		Premium Music ft. Iyanya, Yemi Alade, Tekno Miles, Olamide and Selebobo	"Mama Oyoyo"	Mama Oyoyo - Single
2017		Sugarboy	"Dada Omo"	Dada Omo - Single
2017		Seyi Shay	"Yolo Yolo"	Yolo Yolo - Single
2017		Yemi Alade	"Knack Am"	Knack Am - Single
2017		Dj Coublon	"My Way ft Iyanya"	My Way - Single
2017		Dj Coublon	"Shokotoyokoto ft Klem"	Shokotoyokoto - Single
2018		Yemi Alade	"Oh My Gosh"	Oh My Gosh - Single
2019		Yemi Alade	"Oh My Gosh remix ft Rick Ross"	Woman of Steel
2019		Yemi Alade	"Shekere"	Woman of Steel
2020		Fiokee	"Ósan X Teni (singer) X DJ Coublon	Osan - Single
2020		Dj Coublon	''Holla Me ft Klem"	Holla Me - Single

== Awards and nominations ==
Year	Award ceremony	Prize	Recipient	Result	Ref
2015	Nigeria Entertainment Awards	Music Producer of the Year	Himself	Nominated	
2016	Nigeria Entertainment Awards	Music Producer of the Year	Himself	Nominated	
2016	African Muzik Magazine Awards	Music Producer of the Year	Himself	Nominated	
2016	The Headies	Music Producer of the Year	Himself	Nominated	
2016	The Beatz Awards	New Discovery Producer	Himself	Nominated	
2016	The Beatz Awards	Best Producer	Himself	Nominated	
2016	The Beatz Awards	Best Afro Beat Producer	Himself	Won	
2017	All Africa Music Awards	Producer of the Year	Himself	Won	
