= Empress (album) =

Studio album by Yemi Alade
- Released: November 20, 2020
- Recorded: 2018–2020
- Genre: Afrobeats; Highlife; soul; pop; dancehall
- Length: 48:00
- Label: Effyzzie Music Group
- Producer: Krizbeatz; Vtek; Egar Boi; Jimmy Huru; Yung Felix

Yemi Alade chronology
Woman of Steel (2019)	Empress (2020)	Queendoncom (2021)

Singles from Empress
- 1. "Boyz" Released: 29 May 2020; 2. "True Love" Released: 7 August 2020

Empress is the fourth studio album by Nigerian singer Yemi Alade, released by Effyzzie Music Group on 20 November 2020. The album features collaborations with Dadju, Vegedream, Patoranking, Rudeboy, Estelle, and Mzansi Youth Choir. Composed of fifteen songs, Empress is primarily an Afrobeats record that incorporates other musical styles such as gospel, coupé-décalé, soul, pop, dancehall and highlife.

The album was supported by the singles "Boyz" and "True Love". Three singles from the album charted on the Billboard Top Triller Global chart, making Alade the first Nigerian female artist to do so.

== Background and promotion ==
Empress includes a diverse range of afropop. On its cover is art that showcases Alade as an African royal. This is an afrobeats record that is built mostly in elements of highlife and dancehall. The melodies of Empress are suited to a live experience.

Alade revealed in an interview that when she released her previous album Woman of Steel, she was already recording Empress. She spent two years recording the album. She said that most of its tracks were produced in Amsterdam with the help of her European sound engineers alongside her crew. The album features guest appearances from French singers Vegedream and Dadju, and Nigerian artistes Patoranking and Rudeboy. It also features the British Grammy Award-winning singer Estelle and the Mzansi Youth Choir.

== Composition ==
The first album track is "True Love" which incorporates elements of amapiano South African house music; Alade sings "DJ play that happy music, .... leave the negativity for back" as a mode of setting aside sadness for happiness through music. The second track is "Yoyoyo" built in highlife from southeastern Nigeria; Alade fantasizes about a typical Nigerian play boy and college scarlet girl. Mami water is a Nigerian concept of a mermaid. It is used to describe light-skinned beautiful women or women possessed by the spirit of Poseidon. The Vegedream assisted track is "Lose My Mind". Alade collaborated with a French singer and rapper to produce a song with an African expression of love. "Dancina", the fifth track, is a dance song with a European/Ghanaian originated beat. "Boyz" is a dancehall track in which Alade describes the qualities of the type of men she desires. "I Choose You" featuring Dadju is a pop song. Alade again uses dancehall and afrofusion elements in "Control", the eight track. "Temptation" features Patoranking, Alade's counterpart and co-coach on The Voice Nigeria. "Ice" is a dive from afrobeats, in which Alade displays her vocal dexterity. Rudeboy was featured on the eleventh track "Deceive", in which Alade tells of a story of deception in love. "Turn Up" is another highlife track; Alade sings about loving an ideal celebrity-like man. "Rain", the thirteenth track, features the Mzansi Youth Choir from South Africa; an African gospel music Alade sings about unison. "Weekend" features the British Grammy-winning singer Estelle; Alade takes a break from her regular Pan-African sounds in this track. The last track is "Double Double". Alade uses electronic highlife and coupé décalé originating from Cote d'Ivoire to express joy for her achievements.

== Critical reception ==
Professional ratings
Review scores
Source	Rating
Pulse Nigeria	5.9/10
Scoove Africa	8/10

Empress garnered 10 million streams on YouTube and YouTube music within days of its release. Within four weeks, it had twenty million streams on all streaming platforms. Motolani Alake of Pulse said the album "explores different aspects of love and emotion – be it in from the perspective of kinship as heard on 'Rain' or romance as heard on the others [sic] songs on the album." He gave the album a score of 5.9/10.

Oyin Aregbesola of Sounds of Africa said the album is "an amalgamation of what Yemi is known for plus a mash of Afro-pop, Gospel House, Highlife, Soul, Coupe decale, Gospel, and even Dancehall; she created a body of work that has something for everyone but still manages to be authentic." Olayiide Bolaji of The Scoove Africa gave the album an 8/10, saying that Empress "is Yemi Alade's best album yet... she incorporates Afrobeats into all parts of the world while featuring timeless music..." NotJustOk describes the album as "a feast of sounds", saying, "Its diverse yet cohesive nature serves as an aural depiction of the cultural richness of Africa with something to suit everyone's palates."

Empress was nominated for Album of the Year at the 2021 African Entertainment Awards USA.

== Track listing ==
All tracks are written by Yemi Alade.

No.	Title	Length
1.	"True Love"	3:55
2.	"Yoyoyo"	3:08
3.	"Mami Water"	2:25
4.	"Lose My Mind" (featuring Vegedream)	3:23
5.	"Dancina"	2:30
6.	"Boyz"	3:05
7.	"I choose You" (featuring Dadju)	3:24
8.	"Control"	2:42
9.	"Temptation" (featuring Patoranking)	3:27
10.	"Ice"	3:16
11.	"Deceive" (featuring Rudeboy)	3:28
12.	"Turn Up"	3:06
13.	"Rain"	3:16
14.	"Weekend"	3:36
15.	"Double Double"	3:03
Total length:		48:00

== Personnel ==
Credits adapted from the album's back cover.

- Yemi Alade – primary artiste, composer and executive producer
- Taiye Aliyu – executive producer
- Vtek – producer (track 1,6,11,13,15) and extra vocals (track 15)
- Krizbeatz – producer (track 2,12)
- Jimmy Huru – producer (track 3, 8, 11)
- Egar Boi – producer
- Yung Felix – producer
- Fiokee – guitar (track 2, 12)
- Max Meurs – guitar
- Vegedream – featured artiste
- Estelle – featured artiste
- Dadju – featured artiste

== Release history ==
Region	Date	Version	Format	Label
Various	20 November 2020	Standard	Digital download	Effyzzie Music Group
