= Mama Africa (Yemi Alade album) =

- Standard edition cover artwork; deluxe edition cover artwork features a different image of Yemi Alade

Studio album by Yemi Alade
- Released: March 25, 2016
- Genres: Afropop; highlife; R&B; coupé-décalé; hip hop; pop
- Length: 54:00
- Label: Effyzzie Music Group
- Producers: GospelOnDeBeatz; Selebobo; Masterkraft; Philkeyz; DJ Coublon; Rotimi Keys; BeatsByEmzo; Mr Chidoo

Yemi Alade chronology
| King of Queens (2014) | Mama Africa (2016) | Mama Afrique (2017) |

Singles from Mama Africa
- 1. "Na Gode" Released: 10 July 2015; 2. "Do as I Do" Released: 8 December 2015; 3. "Ferrari" Released: 9 March 2016; 4. "Kom Kom" Released: 18 May 2016; 5. "Africa" Released: 5 July 2016; 6. "Tumbum" Released: 9 November 2016

Mama Africa (also known as Mama Africa: The Diary of an African Woman) is the second studio album by Nigerian singer Yemi Alade. It was released by Effyzzie Music Group on 25 March 2016. A follow-up to King of Queens, the album features collaborations with P-Square, Sarkodie, Sauti Sol, Flavour N'abania, Rotimi Keys, DJ Arafat and Selebobo. Mama Africa was produced by GospelOnDeBeatz, DJ Coublon, Selebobo, Philkeyz, BeatsByEmzo, Masterkraft, Rotimi Keys and Mr. Chidoo. It was supported by the singles "Na Gode", "Do As I Do", "Ferrari", "Kom Kom", "Africa" and "Tumbum". The album's deluxe edition features collaborations with South African musicians Bucie and AKA. Mama Africa won World Beat at the 2017 Independent Music Awards.

== Background and promotion ==
Alade announced that the album would be released in March 2016. She revealed that it will be named Mama Africa and would highlight the virtues and vices of African women. The album's music is a mixture of Afropop, highlife, R&B, coupé-décalé, hip-hop and pop. Alade said recording the album was a struggle because she was constantly travelling to different countries every day. She also said she recorded the album to "capture all of Africa on one CD". Alade told The Fader magazine that she collaborated with artists from West Africa, East Africa and Southern Africa. She recruited GospelOnDeBeatz, DJ Coublon, Selebobo, Philkeyz, BeatsByEmzo, Masterkraft, Rotimi Keys and Mr. Chidoo to produce the album.

Mama Africa features guest appearances from P-Square, Sarkodie, Sauti Sol, Flavour N'abania, Rotimi Keys, DJ Arafat and Selebobo. The album was made available for pre-order on iTunes a week before its official release. Alade announced that proceeds from the album's sales will go to the Feed a Child charity initiative. The album's deluxe edition was released on 6 April 2016, and features collaborations with South African musicians Bucie and AKA. Mama Africa charted in Germany, Malaysia and France.

=== Singles ===
The album's lead single, "Na Gode", was released on 10 July 2015. It translates to Thank You in Hausa and preaches the message of gratitude and giving. The song was produced by Alade's frequent collaborator Selebobo. The music video for "Na Gode" was directed by Paul Gambit and released on 4 November 2015. It features cameo appearances from Skales and Baci. A Swahili version of "Na Gode" was released on 8 January 2016. In an interview on the Homeboyz Radio Morning Show, Alade said Bien-Aimé of Sauti Sol convinced her to record the song in Swahili.

The DJ Arafat-assisted track "Do As I Do" was released on 8 December 2015, as the album's second single. The song was described as a fusion of Afropop and Coupé-Décalé. The album's third single, "Ferrari", was released on 9 March 2016. It was produced by DJ Coublon and features strings by Nigerian guitarist Fiokee. Alade debuted "Ferrari" at the 2016 Africa Magic Viewers Choice Awards. TooXclusive described the song as a highlife song that "talks about love as an action word." The Clarence Peters-directed music video for "Ferrari" was released on 25 March 2016. Nigerian actor Kunle Remi plays Alade's love interest in the video. Prior to releasing the video, Alade released a teaser clip of it on 14 March.

The Flavour N'abania-assisted track "Kom Kom" was released on 18 May 2016, as the album's fourth single. Its music video was directed by Peters. The album's fifth single, "Africa", was released on 5 July 2016. It features vocals by Kenyan band Sauti Sol and was produced by BeatsByEmzo. The song appeared on Sauti Sol's fourth studio album Afrikan Sauce (2019). The music video for "Africa" was directed by Ovie Etseyatse and contains clips of different streets and iconic towers in African cities, as well as pictures of renowned leaders fighting for independence.

The Selebobo-produced track "Tumbum" was released on 9 November 2016, as the album's sixth single. The song's music video was directed by Paul Gambit and features appearances from Ime Bishop Umoh and Beverly Osu. In the video, Alade plays a restaurant cook who serves up jollof and fufu in a rural Nigerian community. In a chat with The Fader magazine in November 2016, Alade said the video was filmed after several weeks of dance rehearsals. "Tumbum" was featured in Just Dance 2018, an interactive dance rhythm game developed by Ubisoft.

== Composition ==
Mama Africa opens with "Na Gode", an energetic song that adulates God. In "Tumbum", Alade laments about an undependable lover who likes Nkechi's jollof but prefers her delicious beans. The house-influenced record "Tonight" features vocals by P-Square. "Kom Kom" borrows from Onyeka Onwenu's "Iyogogo". The Latin-inspired track "Marry Me" is a blend of Nigerian Pidgin, Igbo and salsa. The highlife song "Ferrari" has been described as "blatantly materialistic" because of lyrics like "Oga I don tire to stay Mainland/ E no go bad if you buy me mansion for Banana Island/ Open supermarket for me for Netherlands." In "Kelele", Alade channels King Sunny Adé. In "Ego", she grapples with her need for happiness and the good life. "Nakupenda" contains backup vocals and drumbeat sounds.

== Critical reception ==
Professional ratings
Review scores
| Source | Rating |
|---|---|
| Pulse Nigeria | 3.5/5 stars |
| TooXclusive | 2.5/5 stars |

Mama Africa received mixed reviews from music critics. Jonathan "Joey" Akan of Pulse Nigeria awarded the album 3.5 stars out of 5, commending Alade for improving "significantly from her last solo album with mundane love expressions and stories seemingly turned up a notch." Ade Tayo of Simply Africa Music praised Alade for having "ample material to use for performance purposes on any platform, across Africa." In a review for Circulation magazine, Adaobi Nezianya applauded Alade for "curating the right sounds from diverse places to craft an excellent album."

In a less enthusiastic review, Music in Africa's Oris Aigbokhaevbolo said the album has "zero replay value" and further stated that numerous songs on it "carry the specifically vapid materialism of the stereotypical Lagos girl." Wilfred Okiche of 360nobs described the album as "one big dance party" and said its title is "only a ruse to thread her influences and copy catting into a cohesive effort." TooXclusive's Temitope Delano granted Mama Africa 2.5 stars out of 5, calling it "boring" and saying it is a "far cry from what was expected from this brilliant artiste."

=== Accolades ===
Mama Africa won World Beat at the 2017 Independent Music Awards.

== Track listing ==
Credits adapted from the back cover of Mama Africa.

Mama Africa – Standard edition
| No. | Title | Writer(s) | Producer(s) | Length |
|---|---|---|---|---|
| 1. | "Tumbum" | Yemi Eberechi Alade | Selebobo | 3:03 |
| 2. | "Tonight" (featuring P-Square) | Alade; Paul Okoye; Peter Okoye | GospelOnDeBeatz | 3:53 |
| 3. | "Kom Kom" (featuring Flavour N'abania) | Alade; Chinedu Okoli | Masterkraft | 3:55 |
| 4. | "Baby's Back" | Alade | DJ Coublon | 3:22 |
| 5. | "Marry Me" | Alade | Selebobo | 3:28 |
| 6. | "Africa" (featuring Sauti Sol) | Alade; Bien-Aimé Baraza; Willis Chimano; Savara Mudigi; Polycarp Otieno | BeatsByEmzo | 3:56 |
| 7. | "Ferrari" | Alade | DJ Coublon | 3:26 |
| 8. | "Do As I Do" (featuring DJ Arafat) | Alade; Arafat Muana | Selebobo | 3:16 |
| 9. | "Kelele" (featuring Rotimi Keys) | Alade; Rotimi Akinfenwa | Rotimi Keys | 3:21 |
| 10. | "Ego" (featuring Sarkodie) | Alade; Michael Owusu Addo | Masterkraft | 3:56 |
| 11. | "Mama" | Alade | Mr. Chidoo | 3:22 |
| 12. | "Dorcas" | Alade | Selebobo | 3:51 |
| 13. | "Nakupenda" | Alade | Rotimikeys | 3:30 |

Mama Africa – Bonus tracks
| No. | Title | Writer(s) | Producer(s) | Length |
|---|---|---|---|---|
| 14. | "Na Gode" (featuring Selebobo) | Alade; Udoka Chigozie Oku | Selebobo | 3:26 |
| 15. | "Koffi Anan" (Freestyle) | Alade | Philkeyz | 3:25 |
| Total length: | | | | 54:00 |

Mama Africa – Deluxe edition
| No. | Title | Writer(s) | Producer(s) | Length |
|---|---|---|---|---|
| 16. | "Mama Africa" | Alade | GospelOnDeBeatz | 3:50 |
| 17. | "Mama Africa" (remix; featuring AKA) | Alade; Kiernan Jarryd Forbes | GospelOnDeBeatz | 3:50 |
| 18. | "Waka Waka" (featuring Bucie) | Alade; Busisiwe Nolubabalo Nqwiliso | Kamera | 3:08 |
| 19. | "Sugar n Spice" | Alade | GospelOnDeBeatz | 3:43 |
| 20. | "All Day" | Alade | El Emcee | 3:44 |
| 21. | "Na Gode" (Swahili Version) | Alade | Selebobo | 3:26 |

== Personnel ==
Credits adapted from the album's back cover and AllMusic.

- Yemi Alade – primary artist
- Koribo Harrison – executive producer
- Taiye Aliyu – executive producer
- Udoka Oku – producer, featured artist
- Rotimi Keys – producer, featured artist
- Philkeyz – producer, featured artist
- GospelOnDeBeatz – producer
- Sunday Nweke – producer
- Akwuba Ugochukwu – producer
- BeatsByEmzo – producer
- Chidozie Ekeh - producer
- Kamera - producer
- El Emcee - producer
- P-Square – featured artist
- Flavour N'abania – featured artist
- Sauti Sol – featured artist
- DJ Arafat – featured artist
- Sarkodie – featured artist
- AKA – featured artist
- Bucie – featured artist
- Mix Monster – mixing, mastering
- Suka Sounds – mixing, mastering
- Tee Piano – mixing, mastering
- Olaitan Dada – mixing, mastering
- Fiokee – strings
- Onazi Ogaba (Unravel GFX) – art design
- Emmanuel Oyeleke – photography

== Release history ==
| Region | Date | Version | Format | Label | Ref |
|---|---|---|---|---|---|
| Various | 25 March 2016 | Standard | CD; digital download | Effyzzie Music Group | |
