= Federal Neuro-Psychiatric Hospital, Yaba =

Federal Neuropsychiatric Hospital Yaba Left
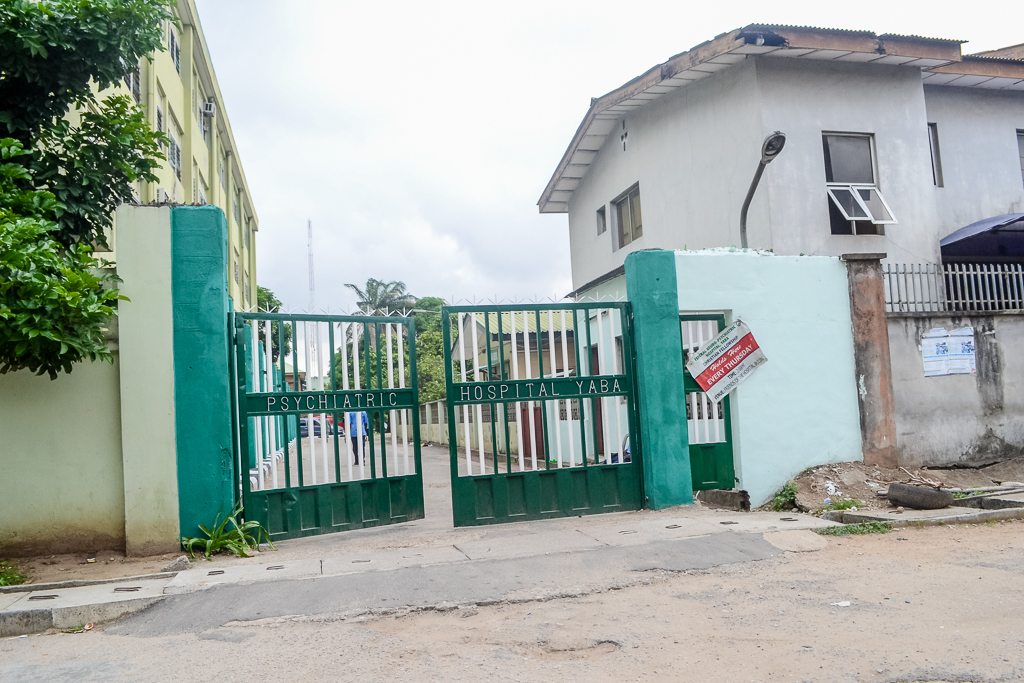
- Main Entrance, Psychiatric Hospital Yaba.

Geography
- Location: Yaba, Lagos Mainland, Lagos State, Nigeria
- Coordinates: 6.505432°N 3.373566°E

Organisation
- Type: Specialists

History
- Former name: Yaba Asylum
- Founded: October 30, 1907

Links
- Lists: Hospitals in Nigeria

The Federal Neuropsychiatric Hospital, which is also known as Yaba Psychiatric Hospital, but popularly known as Yaba Left, is a Nigerian Federal psychiatric hospital in Yaba, a suburb of Lagos, dedicated to providing mental services, conducting research and training professionals.

Established in October 30, mks 1907 (originally as yaba asylum )

== History ==
Yaba Psychiatric Hospital was established in Lagos in 1907 as Yaba Asylum. Mental health care was provided by general medical officers before the emergence of mental health professionals. In the present day, psychiatrists and psychologists oversee custodial interventions.

In March, 2024 Stanbic IBTC Pension Managers renovated the hospital wards which was targeted to enhance patients’ living conditions at the psychiatric facility.

== CMD/Management Team ==
The current chief medical director of Federal Neuro-Psychiatric Hospital, Yaba is Dr. Olugbenga Adekinle Owoeye.

Top Management Committee:

Dr. Olugbenga Adekinle Owoeye - Medical Director - Chairman

Dr. Stephen Oluwaniyi - Head of Clinical Services - Member

Dr. Adeyinka Akinola.O. Antwi- Director of Administration & HR - Member

Mr. Omololu Makinde - Director of Accounts & Finance - Member

Mrs. Kehinde Oyefunke Alonge - Director, Nursing Department - Member

Mr. Oyetunde Ajayi - Director, Pharmacy Department - Member

Mrs. Ikejiaku - Deputy Director (information) - secretary

The Top Management Committee meets regularly to deliberate and to advise the medical director on the management of the hospital. Its function is basically advisory and giving effects to decisions reached at the meeting. They maintained coordination and supervisory roles over their various departments.

== Facilities and Programs ==
In 2023, there was 100% increase in admission to Yaba Psychiatric hospital according to the statement issued by her medical director, Olugbenga Owoeye during the Annual score card presentation of the hospital.

EMGE Resources signed a partnership agreement with the mental health centre in providing advanced technological equipment on 8 April 2024. Also, the resource centre supplied the Johnson and Johnson's Neuroscience Portfolio to Federal Neuropsychiatric Hospital Yaba at a discounted rate.

In September 2024, the psychiatric hospital is one of the beneficiary of 50% electricity subsidy allocated by federal government of Nigeria to public hospitals in Lagos state.
