= The Headies Award for Best Performer =

Nigerian music industry award

- Awarded for: Whose stagecraft, showmanship and performance routines are exceptionally conceptualized and executed in the year under review with consideration of live performances.
- Country: Nigeria
- Presented by: Hip Hop World Magazine
- First award: 2018
- Final award: 2019
- Website: theheadies.com

The Headies Award for Best Performer is an award presented at The Headies, a ceremony that was established in 2006 and originally called the Hip Hop World Awards. It was first presented to Yemi Alade in 2018.

== Recipients ==
Best Performer
Year	Nominees	Result
2019	Yemi Alade	Won
2019	Brymo	Nominated
2019	Adekunle Gold	Nominated
2019	Falz	Nominated
2019	Tiwa Savage	Nominated
2018	Yemi Alade	Won
2018	Flavour	Nominated
2018	Falz	Nominated
2018	M.I Abaga	Nominated
2018	2Baba	Nominated
2018	Tiwa Savage	Nominated

== Category records ==
Most wins

Rank	1st
Artist	Yemi Alade
Total wins	2 wins

Most nominations

Rank	1st
Artist	Yemi Alade; Tiwa Savage; Falz
Total noms	2 nominations
