= DJ Arafat =

Ivorian musician, singer and record producer (1986–2019)

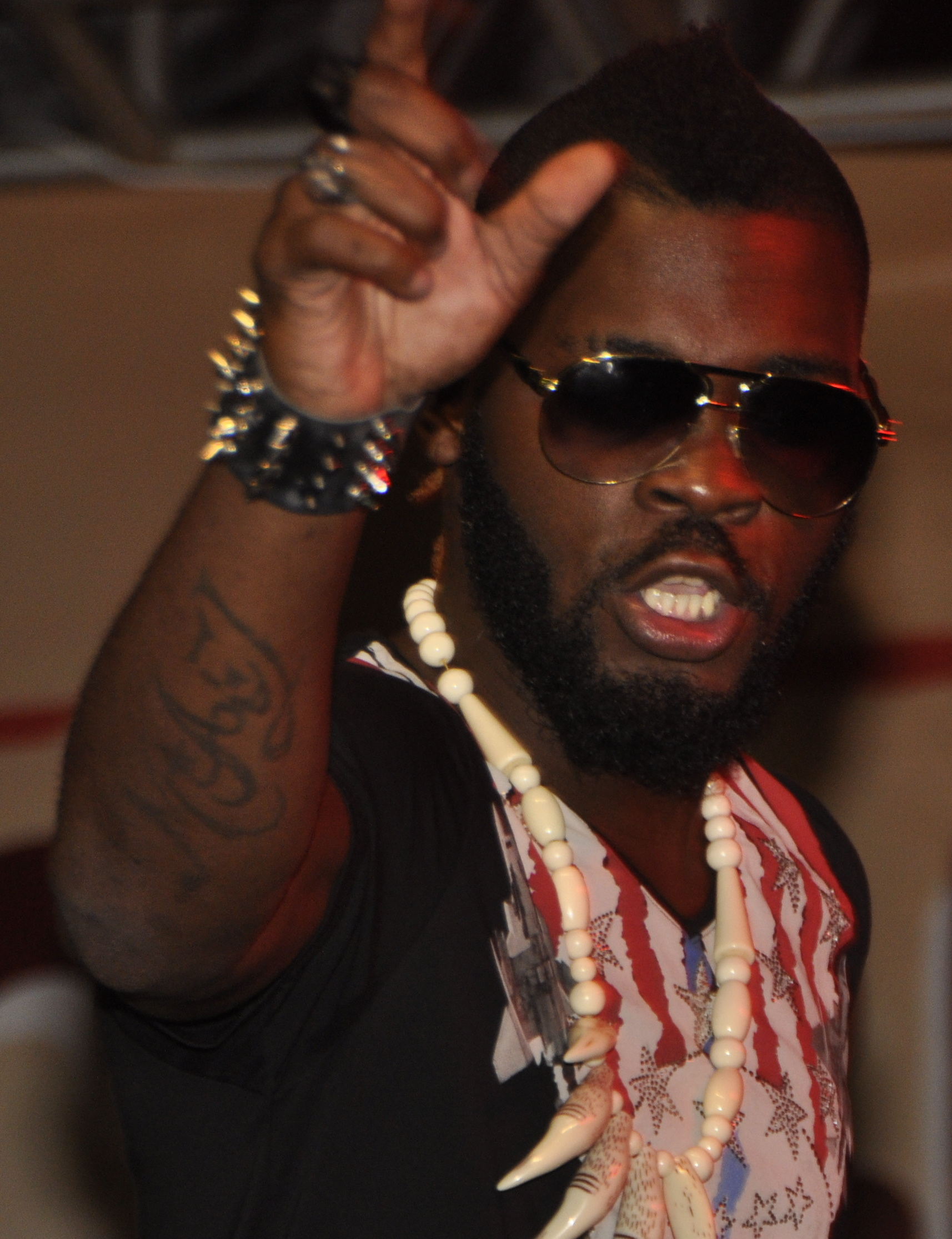
- Arafat in 2016

Background information
- Also known as: Arafat Muana; Arafat DJ 3500 voltes; Yorobo 5500 voltes; Apache 8500 voltes; Sao Tao le Dictateur; Commandant Zabra; Zeus d'Afrique; Termistocle; Influenmento; Ave César; Beerus Sama; Daishikan
- Born: Ange Didier Houon; 26 January 1986; Yopougon, Ivory Coast
- Died: 12 August 2019 (aged 33) Abidjan, Ivory Coast
- Genres: Coupé-Décalé
- Website: www.djarafat.net

Ange Didier Houon (26 January 1986 – 12 August 2019), known professionally as DJ Arafat and various other stage names, was an Ivorian disc jockey and singer who made music in the Coupé-Décalé genre. The word "coupé-décalé" came from a traditional dance in the Ivory Coast. "Jonathan", "202", "Dosabado", "Kpangor", "Zoropoto" and "Enfant Beni" were some of his major hits. Dj Arafat's impact reached beyond Africa, especially after he gained a following in France. His performances there in the mid-2000s helped him cultivate an international fanbase and contributed to his reputation as an African music ambassador.

== Life and career ==
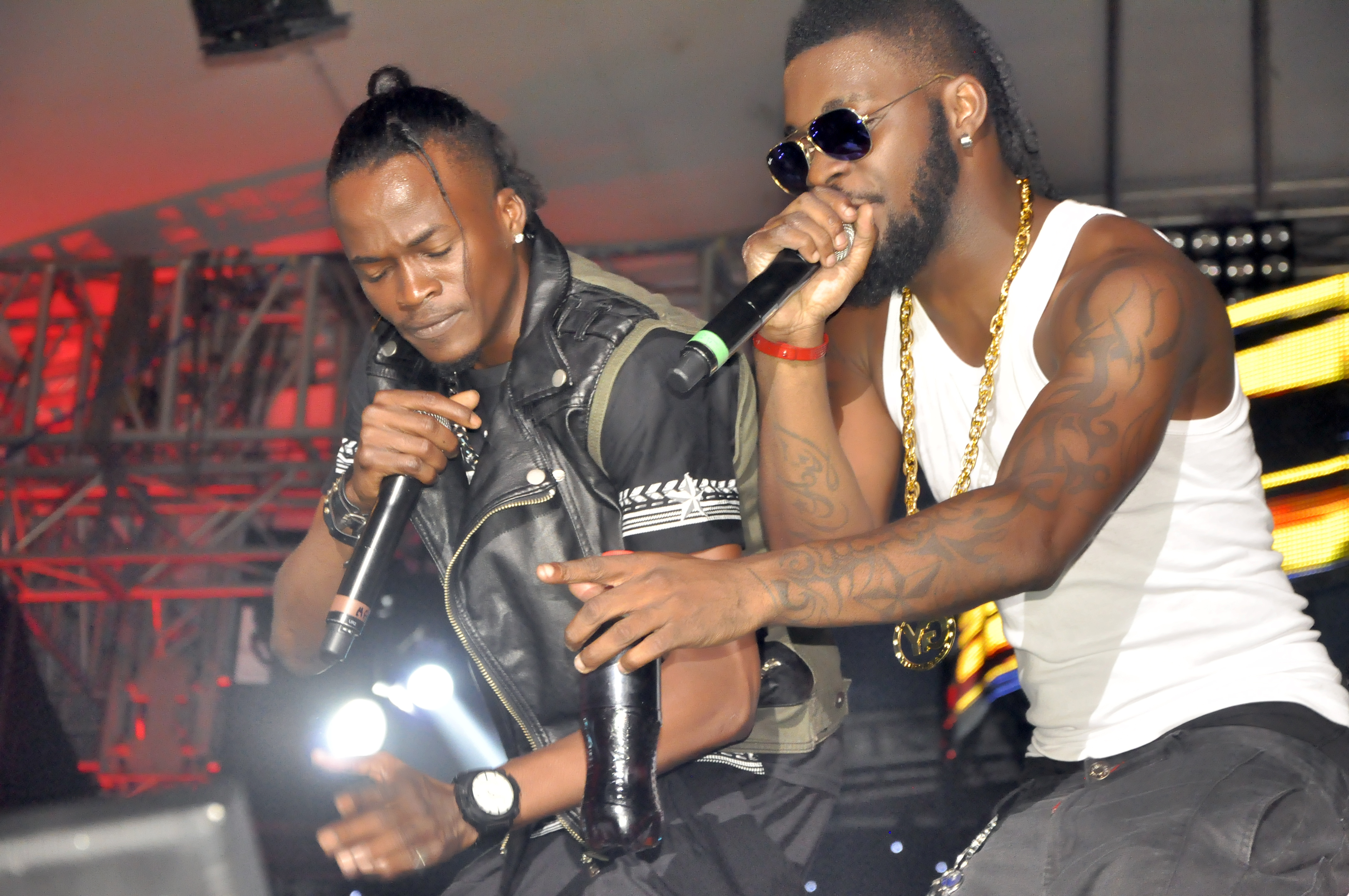
DJ Arafat along with Debordo Likufa at a stage show in Abidjan

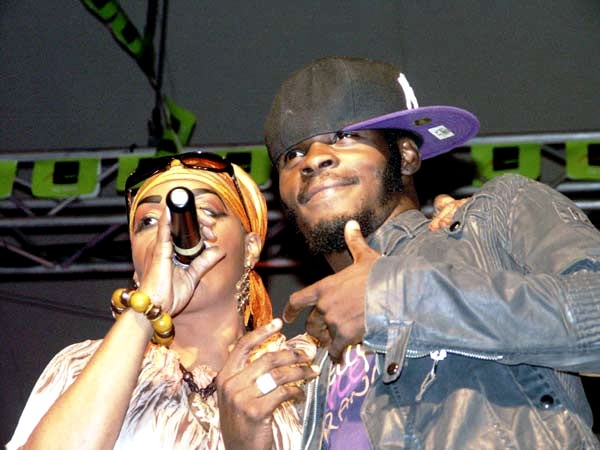
DJ Arafat and his mother

Arafat was born as Ange Didier Houon on 26 January 1986. He was the son of Tina Glamour, a popular singer, and the deceased musician and sound engineer, Pierre Houon. He has an older brother who is well known as DJ TV3. Ange Didier started his music career in the early 2000s as a DJ when he was only 14 years old in Yopougon, a night-life district in Abidjan. He left for France to improve his career and even overstayed his visa. In 2005, he spent a month in detention as an undocumented migrant.

The stage name Arafat refers to Palestinian leader Yasser Arafat; he stated that Lebanese friends in the Ivory Coast gave him the nickname because he was “hardcore”.

He was considered one of the most popular African artists in Francophone countries around the world. He became a star of his genre around 2009.

He released 11 music albums primarily in the popular "Coupé-Décalé" dance music style, in his career that spanned fifteen years. BBC described him as the "king" of Coupé-Décalé, which means "cut and run". In Ivorian slang, it means "to cheat someone and run away" and it emerged in the early 2000s during Ivory Coast's civil war. This style of music also came about at a time where the youth felt down in their spirits to feel as though they needed something uplifting and give them hope for a better life. This genre of music incorporates fast percussion, deep bass and hip-hop-style vocals. Arafat became the symbol of the flashy well-dressed lifestyle which is associated with the music. His song 'Dosabado' is one of his most popular hits. He liked motorcycles and also featured them in his recent hit 'Moto Moto' released in May 2019. He had multiple motorcycle accidents, one of which in 2009, was serious. Arafat's motorcycle accident in 2019 was fatal.

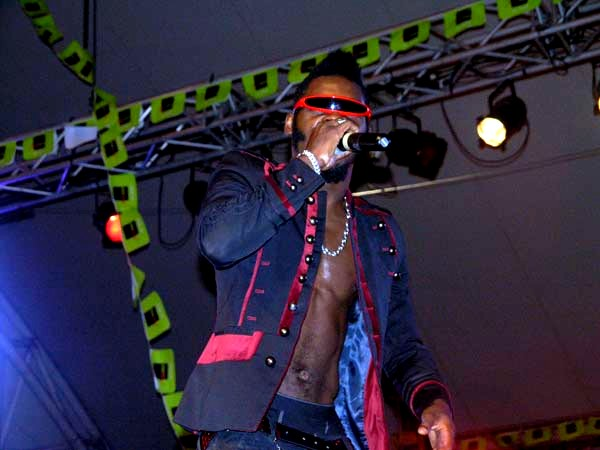
Dj Arafat performing at a concert

Arafat later became popular in Europe and in the United States when some of the sports personalities popularized the dance steps of coupé-décalé genre. Although Arafat was not the creator of this genre, he did take part in it becoming mainstream, leading him to gain a large following in western and central African countries."Dosabado", "Kpangor", "Zoropoto", "Enfant Beni" and "Moto, Moto" were some of his major hits.

== Death ==
On 12 August 2019, Arafat died in Abidjan Hospital after a motorcycle accident in Abidjan, Ivory Coast. His motorcycle was said to have collided with a car in the Angre neighborhood on Sunday, 11 August 2019. He was subsequently admitted to a hospital in Abidjan for a skull fracture before eventually dying at around 8:00 a.m. UTC on 12 August 2019.

After the news of his death spread, around 1,000 of his fans assembled in Cocody suburb near the hospital where he died, and mourned his death chanting "Arafat cannot die". After his burial, some fans exhumed his grave after a rumor sufficed that his body was given to cult members. Police struggled to manage the crowd gathered in the area. A crowd of his fans also gathered around his house singing some of his hits. Maurice Kouakou Bandaman, the Ivorian Culture Minister, condoled his death and a tribute was held in his honour.

== Awards ==
Dj Arafat was widely celebrated in the coupé-décalé music genre, earning multiple awards and recognitions. Among his most notable achievements was the "Best Artist of the Year" title twice consecutively in 2016 and 2017 at the Coupé-Décalé Awards. This was a testament to his influence and popularity in Francophone Africa. These back-to-back awards underscored his role in bringing the Ivorian-born genre to a global audience. His unique style and dedication to the music scene helped redefine coupé-décalé, making him one of the most prominent artists in the genre's history. He also won two WatsUp TV Africa Music Video Awards in 2016.

Despite his untimely death in 2019, Dj Arafat's legacy continues to be celebrated at African music award ceremonies, where he is remembered as an icon of Ivorian music and a lasting influence in the coupé-décalé scene.

=== WatsUp TV Africa Music Video Awards ===
Year	Nominee / work	Award	Result
2016	Maplôrly	Best West African Video	Won
2016	Concert a Korhogo	Best African Performance	Won

== Selected discography ==
=== Singles (partial) ===
- Kpangor
- Zropoto
- Boudha
- Djessimidjeka
- Agbangnan
- 2016 : " Approchez Regardez"
- 2017 : "Enfant béni"
- 2018 : "Dosabado"
- 2019 : "Moto Moto"
- 2020 : "Kong"

== Tours ==
Name	Dates	Countries visited	Album
Réconciliation	July to August 2010	Cameroon, Mali, Ivory Coast	Gladiator & Roi du Kpangor
Moto Moto Tour	27 July to 12 August 2019 (death)	Ivory Coast	Renaissance
