= King of Queens (album) =

- Standard edition cover artwork; deluxe edition cover artwork features a different image of Yemi Alade

Studio album by Yemi Alade
- Released: 2 October 2014
- Recorded: 2013–2014
- Genre: Afropop; reggae; R&B
- Length: 70:00
- Label: Effyzzie Music Group
- Producer: Selebobo; Sizzle Pro; Shady Bizniz; Philkeyz; Young D; GospelOnDeBeatz; DIL; OJB Jezreel; Mr Chidoo; Fliptyce; EL Mcee; Beat Nation

Yemi Alade chronology
King of Queens (2014)	Mama Africa (2016)

Singles from King of Queens
- 1. "Johnny" Released: 14 October 2013; 2. "Tangerine" Released: 14 April 2014; 3. "Kissing" Released: 10 September 2014; 4. "Taking Over Me" Released: 21 January 2015; 5. "Temperature" Released: 13 March 2015; 6. "Duro Timi" Released: 30 July 2015

King of Queens is the debut studio album by Nigerian singer Yemi Alade. It was released by Effyzzie Music Group on 2 October 2014. The album was produced by Selebobo, Sizzle Pro, Shady Bizniz, and OJB Jezreel, among others. King of Queens was supported by the singles "Johnny", "Tangerine", "Kissing", "Taking Over Me", "Temperature" and "Duro Timi". The album features guest appearances and skits from Bovi, R2Bees, Phyno, Chidinma, DIL, Selebobo and Diamond Platnumz.

Alade promoted King of Queens by touring several African countries, including Ghana, Kenya and South Africa. The album's deluxe edition, which was released in November 2014, includes French renditions of songs previously performed in English. The cover art for the deluxe edition was unveiled on 21 October 2014. According to the music platform A Nation of Billions, King of Queens sold over 100,000 copies.

== Background and promotion ==
Alade recorded King of Queens between 2013 and 2014. In May 2014, Effyzzie Music Group revealed the album's title and told Nigeria Entertainment Today that it would be released in July 2014. The Daily Times of Nigeria later reported that the album would be released in September 2014. Alade collaborated with producers such as Selebobo, Sizzle Pro, Shady Bizniz, Philkeyz, Young D, GospelOnDeBeatz, DIL, OJB Jezreel, Mr Chidoo, Fliptyce, EL Mcee and Beat Nation. The album features guest appearances and skits from Bovi, R2Bees, Phyno, Chidinma, DIL, Selebobo and Diamond Platnumz. Alade promoted the album by touring several African countries, including Ghana, Kenya and South Africa. The album's deluxe edition was released in November 2014 and contains French renditions of songs originally performed in English. Its cover art was unveiled on 21 October 2014. According to the music platform A Nation of Billions, King of Queens sold over 100,000 copies.

The Selebobo-produced track "Johnny", which was released on 14 October 2013, serves as the album's lead single. The music video for the song was uploaded to Alade's Vevo channel on 3 March 2014. It was filmed in Ogun State by Clarence Peters and features cameo appearances from Bovi, Alexx Ekubo and Beverly Osu. The French version of "Johnny" debuted on May 20, 2014 and appeared as a bonus track on the album. At the time of the song's release, Alade became the first Nigerian artist to release a song performed entirely in French.

On 14 April 2014, Alade released the album's second single "Tangerine", which was also produced by Selebobo. The song's music video was also filmed by Peters and uploaded to Vevo on 8 July 2014. Prior to releasing the video, Effyzzie Music Group unveiled footage from the video shoot. The album's third single, "Kissing", was released on 10 September 2014. It was produced by Fliptyce and is considered a groovy mid-tempo love song. On 16 October 2014, Effyzzie Music Group released the music video for "Kissing", which was directed by Sesan in London.

"Taking Over Me" was released as the album's fourth single. Its music video was directed by Justin Campos and Taiye Aliyu. On 13 March 2015, Alade released the album's fifth single "Temperature", which features vocals by British-Nigerian singer DIL. The accompanying music video for the song was directed by Ovié Étseyatsé. "Duro Timi" was released as the album's sixth single; its music video was recorded in London by Ova.

== Composition ==
King of Queens is a mixture of Afropop, reggae and R&B. In the slow-tempo reggae track "Why", Alade explores her versatility and infuses her personality on the record "Pose". "Duro Timi" is an R&B song with a pop undertone. In the slow cuddle song "Catch You", Alade creates sexual rhythm and raps towards the end. "Money" is a reincarnation of "Johnny". Hausa vibes are included on "I Like". "Sugar" is an electro pop song, while "Fall in Love" is a ballad that pays tribute to R&B of the 1980s.

== Critical reception ==
Professional ratings
Review scores
Source	Rating
Pulse Nigeria	3.5/5 stars
TooXclusive	3/5 stars

King of Queens received generally mixed reviews from music critics. Pulse Nigeria's Ayomide Tayo awarded the album 3.5 stars out of 5, praising Alade for "stamping her authority on so many genres" and commending her for "crafting local pop tracks and delivering slow love songs with a regal glow." Al Yhusuff and Jim Donnett granted the album 3 stars out of 5, calling it "decent" and saying "pressures and some careless choices might have swayed a couple of decisions" on it.

=== Accolades ===
King of Queens was nominated for Best R&B/Pop Album and Album of the Year at The Headies 2015. The album was also nominated for Album of the Year at the 2015 Nigeria Entertainment Awards.

== Track listing ==
No.	Title	Writer(s)	Producer(s)	Length
1.	"Intro" (featuring Bovi)	Bovi Ugboma	—	0:36
2.	"Johnny"	Yemi Eberechi Alade	Selebobo	3:56
3.	"Why"	Alade	OJB Jezreel	3:52
4.	"Pose" (featuring R2Bees)	Alade; Rashid Mugeez; Faisal Hakeem	Young D	3:21
5.	"Duro Timi"	Alade	Sizzle Pro	3:44
6.	"Catch You"	Alade	Shady Bizniz	4:00
7.	"King (Koq) [Interlude]"	Alade	Fliptyce	2:13
8.	"Money"	Alade	GospelOnDeBeatz	3:25
9.	"I Like"	Alade	EL Mcee; Beat Nation; OJB Jezreel	3:56
10.	"Taking Over Me" (featuring Phyno)	Alade; Azubuike Nelson	GospelOnDeBeatz	3:29
11.	"Sugar"	Alade	Philkeyz	3:18
12.	"Selense" (featuring Chidinma)	Alade; Chidinma Ekile	Mr Chidoo	3:13
13.	"Fall in Love"	Alade	GospelOnDeBeatz	3:54
14.	"Temperature" (featuring DIL)	Alade; Dil Anthony Ajufo	DIL	4:00
15.	"Kissing"	Alade	Fliptyce	3:45
16.	"Tangerine" (featuring Selebobo)	Alade; Udoka Chigozie Oku	Selebobo	3:46
17.	"Daddy Oyoyo"	Alade	Fliptyce	3:41

Deluxe edition
No.	Title	Writer(s)	Producer(s)	Length
18.	"Johnny (French Version)"	Alade	Selebobo	3:59
19.	"Kissing (Remix)" (featuring Diamond Platnumz)	Alade; Nasibu Juma	Fliptyce	3:45
20.	"Looking at Me"	Alade	Young D	3:43

Notes

- "—" denotes a skit

== Personnel ==
Credits adapted from the back cover of King of Queens.

- Yemi Alade – primary artist, writer, performer
- Koribo Harrison – executive producer
- Taiye Aliyu – executive producer
- Tpiano – mixing, mastering
- Clu Briz – mixing, mastering
- Selebobo – featured artist, writer, production, mixing, mastering
- Sizzle Pro – production, mixing, mastering
- Shady Bizniz – production, mixing, mastering
- Philkeyz – production, mixing, mastering
- Young D – production, mixing, mastering
- GospelOnDeBeatz – production, mixing, mastering
- DIL – featured artist, writer, production, mixing, mastering
- OJB Jezreel – production
- Mr Chidoo – production
- Fliptyce – production
- EL Mcee – production
- Beat Nation – production
- Bovi Ugboma – skit
- R2Bees – featured artist, writer
- Azubuike Nelson – featured artist, writer
- Chidinma Ekile – featured artist, writer
- Nasibu Juma – featured artist, writer
- August Udoh – photography
- UnravelGfx – album art

== Release history ==
Region	Date	Version	Format	Label	Ref
Various	2 October 2014	Standard	CD; digital download	Effyzzie Music Group	
