= DIL (musician) =

British-Nigerian singer

Mr DiL
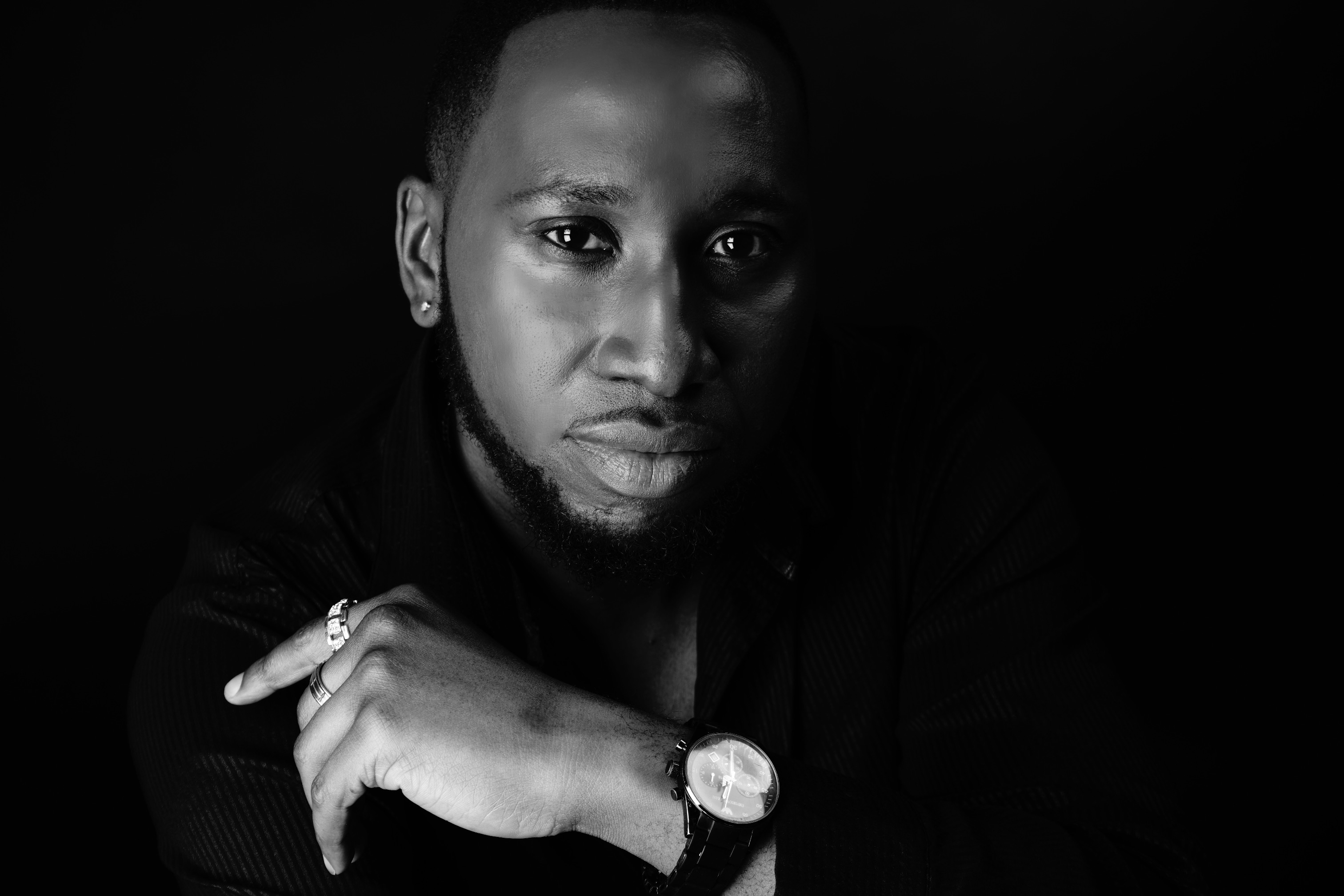
- Mr DiL

Background information
- Born: Dil Anthony Chike Ajufo; Westminster, London
- Genres: R&B, pop, Afropop, Hip hop
- Occupations: Actor, Musician songwriter sound engineer record producer
- Years active: 2005–present
- Labels: Trakk Records; Red Rhythm

Dil Anthony Chike Ajufo, professionally known as Mr DiL or just DiL, is a British-Nigerian actor, singer, record producer, film editor, and audio engineer. He is known for his work on films including Aníkúlápó (2022), She Must Be Obeyed (2023), Sugar Rush (2019), Nneka the Pretty Serpent (2020), Introducing the Kujus (2020), and The Order of Things (2022), and has received a nomination for the Africa Magic Viewers' Choice Awards (AMVCA). In music, he is known for the soundtrack song "Don't Let Go" from Kasanova (2019), the single "Pretty Girls" featuring Iyanya, and his collaboration with Yemi Alade on "Temperature". His production credits include work with Wizkid, Red Rhythm, Boyz II Men, Leona Lewis, and Michelle Williams. He received a Silver Sales Award for his work on the LaVelle Smith Jr. Bodylicious soundtrack and is the founder of Trakk Studios.

== Music ==
=== Red Rhythm ===
DiL was part of Red Rhythm's producer, songwriter and remix team along with Simon Britton and Cliff Randal. whose credits include: Ashanti, Aaliyah, Boyz II Men, Sean Paul, Tara McDonald, Run DMC, Liberty X, Kool & The Gang, Aggro Santos, Kimberly Wyatt, Electric Giant Beatz, Chaka Demus & Pliers, Michelle Williams Missy Elliott, Sting, Talib Kweli, Timbaland, Leona Lewis.

DiL has shared the stage with many artists. He performed at the Corporate Elite Show 2014 at the Eko Hotels and Suites in Nigeria alongside Iyanya, Mavin Records, Dru Hill, Mario Freddie Jackson, Cameo (band) and many more.

He has toured many countries performing his singles including France, Germany, United States, UK, Dubai and more.

== Early life and career beginnings ==
DiL was born in London. He spent a few of his early years in Nigeria and moved back to London in the mid-1990s. He studied at Southwark College and later obtained a degree in Music and Sound Technology from West London University.

He first started producing music on a PlayStation 2 where he caught the attention of Simon Britton. He later teamed up with Red Rhythm and Simon Britton in 2004 as a music producer and worked on various projects which included Ashanti, Aaliyah, Boyz II Men, Sean Paul, Tara McDonald, Run DMC, Liberty X, Kool & The Gang, Aggro Santos, Kimberly Wyatt, Electric Giant Beatz, Chaka Demus & Pliers, Michelle Williams Missy Elliott, Sting, Talib Kweli, Timbaland, Leona Lewis. He received a silver sales award for his work on LaVelle Smith Jnr's Bodylicious Workout DVD. He later started working on remixes and cover songs with Red Rhythm under his production company at the time Blaq Money. DiL started his career as a solo artist in 2010 and in 2013, he released his first official single titled "Acapella" which featured Praiz and Lynxxx. He released his second official single "Pretty Girls" in 2014 and this time featured afro pop star Iyanya. In early 2015, he collaborated with Yemi Alade on a song for her King of Queens. The video for the song Temperature which he featured on was released in March 2015.

He began his film career in 2019 as a sound designer and audio specialist and focused on delivering 5.1 surround sound in Nollywood movies to the Nigerian cinema. He was the first to do so in March 2019 with the cinema release of The Reunion by Fojo Media.

By the end of 2019 he was able to work with Jade Osiberu on the Box Office movie Sugar Rush where he did the sound design and sound mix for the film. The following year he worked on many movies including Nneka The Pretty Serpent which earned him an AMVCA nomination for best sound editor. He began acting in 2021 and has earned roles on a few movies including Eva’s Love Story, Just Us, and The Devil is a Liar.

== Reality TV ==
=== Queer Eye for the Straight Guy ===
In 2004, DiL appeared alongside Simon Britton in the NBC America/Bravo TV show Queer Eye for the Straight Guy it was a popular reality television show in America at the time. It was also the first time the show had gone outside of the United States and they came to the UK for a one-off special. Simon Britton, DiL and Cliff Randal ended the show with a one-off gig at the Scala in London for a CD release launch party, featuring the single "Someone Call The Doctor".
