= Krizbeatz =

- Born: Chris Alvin Ifeanyichukwu Sunday; 25 December 1994 (age 31); Lagos State, Nigeria
- Genres: hip hop; Afropop
- Occupation: record producer
- Years active: 2015–present
- Website: krizbeatzmusicacademy.com

Chris Alvin Ifeanyichukwu Sunday professionally known as Krizbeatz or KrizBeatz the drummer Boy, is a Nigerian record producer best known for producing Tekno his first single "Pana". Ranked 3rd on Pulse Nigeria's 2016 list of "Top 5 Best Nigerian Music Producers", KrizBeatz has worked with Yemi Alade and others including Oyibo Rebel, Skales, Lil Kesh and Koker while also releasing his own single titled "Erima" and the hit single "911" featuring Yemi Alade and Harmonize which further pushed his career to limelight. The song "911" currently has over 20 million views on YouTube.

== Early life and career ==
Chris Alvin Sunday attended the University of Ibadan, where he obtained a degree in Linguistics, and studied Music Technology in South Africa.

== Discography ==
=== Singles ===
- "King of New Wave" (2016)
- "Erima" (featuring Davido & Tekno) (2017)
- "Boss Whine" (featuring Skales) (2017)
- Riddim (feat Yemi Alade, Skales) 2020

=== ADM (Afro Dance Music) Album ===
- "911" ft. Yemi Alade, Harmonize (2017)

=== Singles produced ===
Title	Year	Album	Release date
"Crushing On Di’ja" (Kshab)	2014	Non-album single	
"Melo Lara Mi" (Kshab)	2014	Non-album single	
"Marry Me" (Mickey featuring. Jahbless)	2015	Non-album single	
"Egbami" (Jayru featuring. Portah)	2015	Non-album single	
"I Hear Ya" (Mosky featuring. Tekno)	2015	Non-album single	
"Higher" (SheunNatural)	2015	Non-album single	
"Mary O" (Blizz B)	2015	Non-album single	
"Modi" (Jahbless featuring. Seriki & Small Doctor)	2015	Non-album single	
"Pana" (Tekno)	2016	Non-album single	
"Diana" (Tekno)	2016	Non-album single	
"Ishe" (Motunez)	2016	Non-album single	
"Temper" (Skales)	2016	"The Never Say Never Guy"	29 May 2017
"Make Way" (Cee Boi featuring. Sojay)	2016	Non-album single	
"Ro Jo" (DJ Hazan featuring. Dremo & Kymo)	2016	Non-album single	
"Shele Gan Gan" (Lil Kesh)	2016	Non-album single	
"Dio (Refix)" (MC Galaxy)	2017	Non-album single	
"Oma Oma" (D’General)	2017	Non-album single	
"Weekend Vibes" (Seyi Shay)	2017	Non-album single	
"BabyO" (Sheyman)	2017	Non-album single	
"Jamina" (Emma Nyra)	2017	Non-album single	

== Awards and nominations ==
Year	Awards ceremony	Award description(s)	Results
2017	Nigeria Entertainment Awards	Best Music Producer	Won
2017	African Muzik Magazine Awards	Music Producer of The Year	Nominated
2017	The Beatz Awards	Best Afro Dancehall Producer	Nominated
2018	Nigeria Entertainment Awards	Best Music Producer	Nominated
2018	City People Music Awards	Best Music Producer of the Year	Nominated
2019	The Beatz Awards	Afro Dancehall Producer of the Year	Nominated
2021	The Beatz Awards	Afro Highlife Producer of the Year	Nominated
