= Rudeboy (singer) =

Nigerian singer (born 1981)

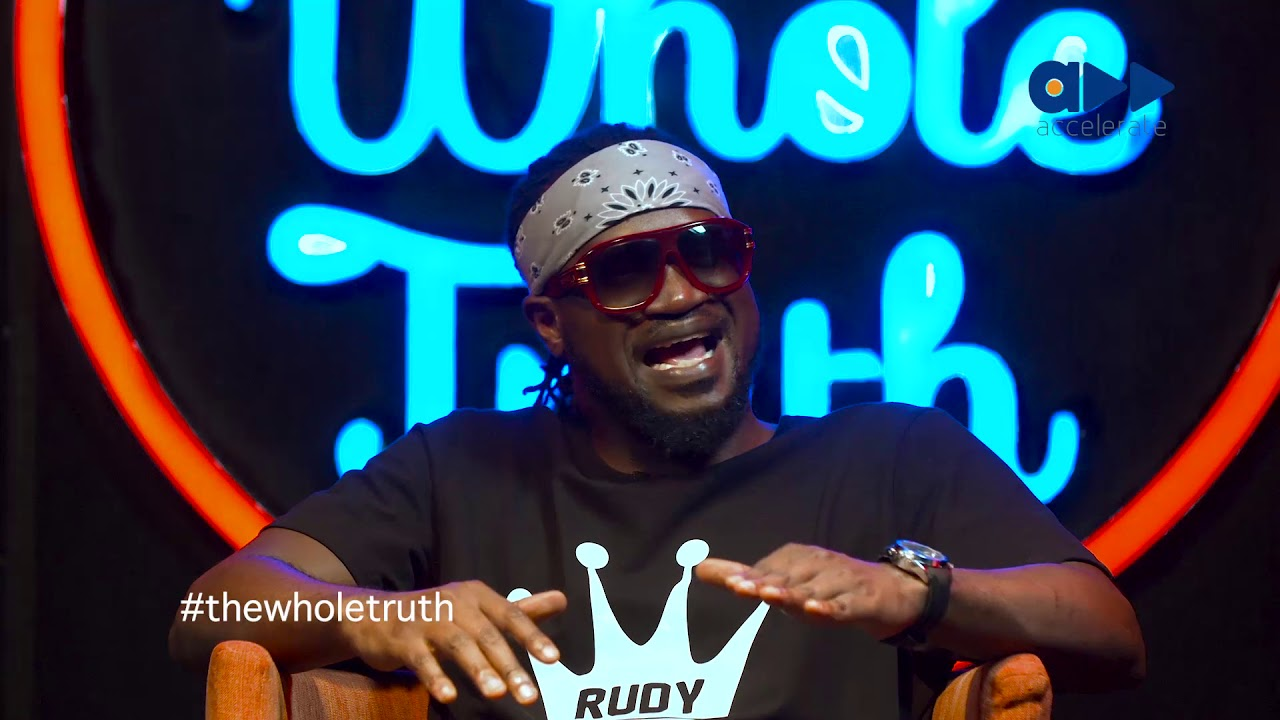
- Okoye during an interview
- Born: Paul Nonso Okoye; 18 November 1981 (age 44); Jos, Plateau, Nigeria
- Other name: King Rudy
- Occupations: Singer; songwriter; dancer; record producer
- Years active: 2003–present
- Partner: Ivy Ifeoma
- Children: 4
- Relatives: Mr. P (brother); Jude Okoye (brother)
- Musical career
- Origin: Ifite Dunu, Anambra, Nigeria
- Genres: Afrobeats; R&B; hip-hop; dancehall; reggae
- Instruments: Vocals
- Label: Fire Department Inc.

Paul Nonso Okoye// (born 18 November 1981), who is better known as Rudeboy, is a Nigerian singer. He rose to fame in the 2000s as a member of the P-Square duo with his identical twin brother Peter Okoye.

== Early life and education ==
Paul studied at St. Murumba secondary school in Jos, together with his brother, Peter also known as Mr P. Paul joined a school of music and drama club where he started dancing and performing covers songs produced by MC Hammer, Bobby Brown and Michael Jackson with his brother Peter.

== Solo career ==
After the disbandment of P-Square in 2017, both band members sought separate musical careers. Rudeboy released his debut solo tracks titled 'Fire Fire' and 'Nkenji Keke' in 2017. His song "Reason With Me" generated the highest views on YouTube in Africa in 2019. He is the founder of Fire Department Inc, a record label he established in 2019. He released his debut studio album Rudykillus in 2021. One of his hit single “Reason with me” was released on 15 April 2019, with direction by Clarence Peters, the music video for “Reason With Me” currently boasts more than 189 million views on YouTube, making it Rudeboy's most-viewed video.

== Personal life ==
On 22 March 2014 Okoye married Anita Isama, whom he met in 2004 during his studies at the University of Abuja. In 2013, their son Andre was born in Atlanta, Georgia, United States. The couple also have a set of twins who were delivered in Atlanta, USA.

In August 2021, his wife filed for divorce due to irreconcilable differences with him.
