= Selebobo =

Nigerian singer and songwriter

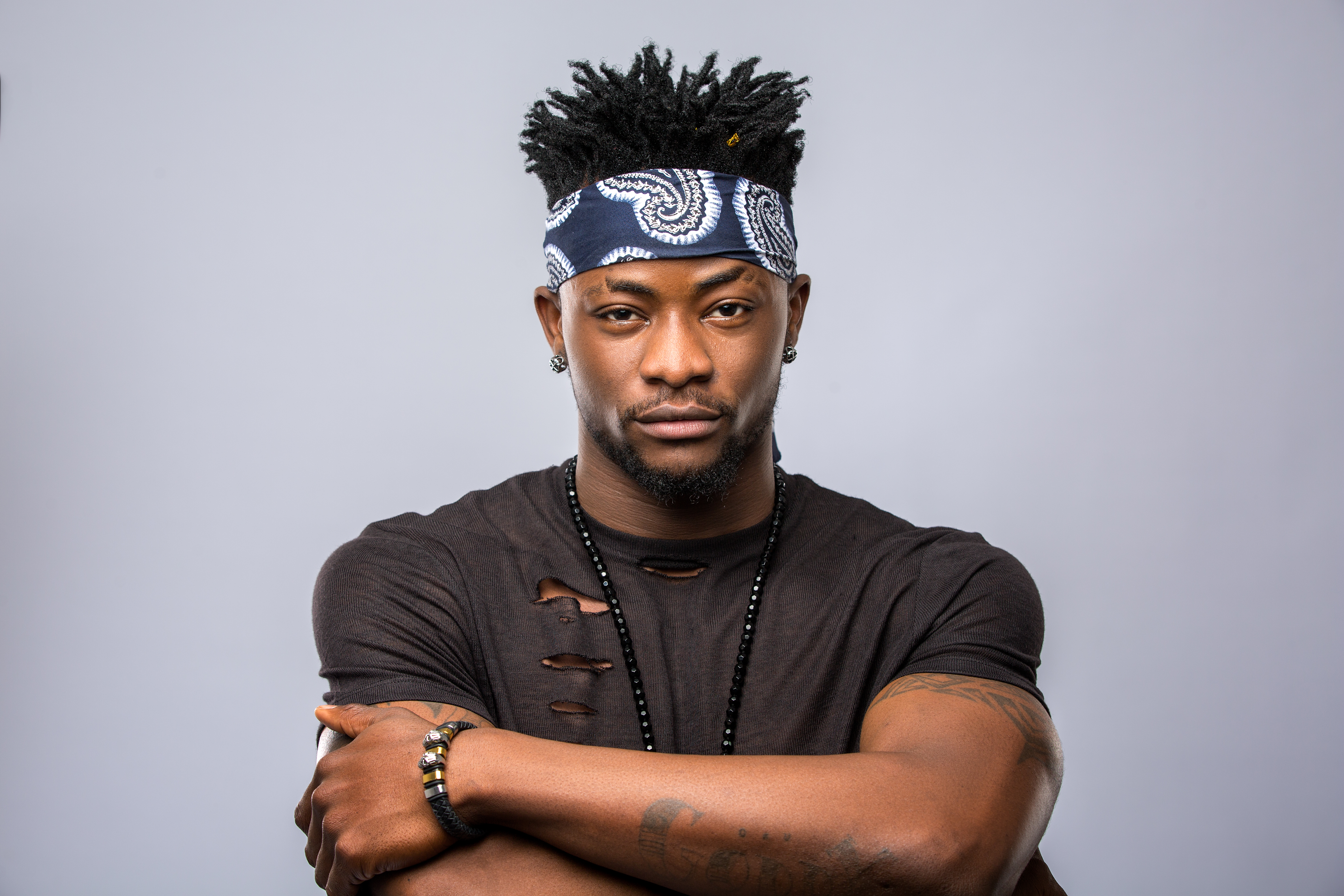
- Selebobo in 2016

Background information
- Born: Udoka Chigozie Oku; 29 July 1992 (age 33); Enugu State, Nigeria
- Genres: Afro pop; R&B; hip-hop
- Occupations: Singer; songwriter; producer; mixing engineer
- Instrument: Vocals
- Years active: 2012–present
- Label: Vault

Udoka Chigozie Oku, also known by his stage name Selebobo, is a Nigerian singer, songwriter, producer, and mixing engineer. Formerly signed to Made Men Music Group. Selebobo is most known for his singles, "Yoyo', "Selfie", and "Waka Waka". He has also collaborated with Flavour N'abania, Yemi Alade, Tekno Miles, Emma Nyra, and Iyanya. He was also a nominee of the Producer of the Year category at 2018 The Headies.

== Early life ==
Udoka Chigozie Oku was born on July 29, 1992, to parents of Igbo descent in Enugu State, Nigeria. He is the eleventh out of the twelve in his family, with one of his brothers, Okechukwu Oku, being a popular director. His father, Goddy Oku, was a guitarist and musician who played during local shows throughout the 1970s. As a result, he was taught many instruments, including the guitar, and was enriched in music. By the time he was twelve, he started to produce music on his keyboard.

== Education ==
Oku attended primary and secondary school in Enugu State, but later went on to the Nnamdi Azikiwe University, in Awka, Anambra State, and received a bachelor's degree in Fine Arts.

== Career ==
In an attempt to launch his career, he started to write and produce songs, but it wasn't until 2013, before he successfully released his hit single, "Yoyo", featuring J. Martins. Soon afterwards, he would be signed to the record label, Made Men Music Group (MMMG), along with Tekno, Iyanya, and Emma Nyra. Under MMMG, Selebobo was known as Mixx Monsta. In 2014, he also produced the hit single, "Johnny", for Yemi Alade, which has garnered more than a hundred million views.

Oku left MMMG in 2019 to start his own record label, "Vault".

In 2020, producer Jay Q sued Oku for copyright infringement, claiming that his use of trombone melodies on the song "Take" was plagiarized.

Oku is a producer on Rudeboy's 2021 debut solo album, Rudykillus.

== Awards ==
Selebobo has won and been nominated for various awards. These awards include the Best Collaboration of the Year Award, the Best Producer at the Nigeria Entertainment Awards, Best Pop Artist at the Nigeria Entertainment Awards, Best New Act to Watch at the Nigeria Entertainment Awards, and Best Artiste of the Year at the City People Entertainment Awards.
