= 2016 Nigeria Entertainment Awards =

- Date: September 4, 2016
- Location: BMCC Tribeca Performing Arts Center, New York City, New York, U.S.A
- Country: Nigeria
- Hosted by: Richard Mofe Damijo; Ebbe Bassey
- Most awards: Olamide, Kiss Daniel, Adekunle Gold (2)
- Most nominations: Olamide, Tekno Miles, Seyi Shay (3)

The 2016 Nigeria Entertainment Awards is the 11th edition of the Nigeria Entertainment Awards. Hosted by Richard Mofe Damijo and Ebbe Bassey, the event was held on September 4 at the BMCC Tribeca Performing Arts Center in New York City, U.S.

== Winners and nominees ==
The awards were categorized into three categories: Music category, Film/TV category and Other category. Below is the list of nominees and winners for the popular music categories. Winners are highlighted in bold.

=== Music category ===
| **Album of the Year**: **Eyan Mayweather** – **Olamide**; Y.A.G.I – Lil Kesh; Applaudise – Iyanya; Ghetto University – Runtown; R.E.D – Tiwa Savage; Stories That Touch – Falz | **Hottest Single of the Year**: **"Mama" – Kiss Daniel**; "Duro" – Tekno Miles; "Lagos Boys" – Olamide; "Jagaban" – Ycee; "Baba Nla" – Wizkid; "Osinachi" – Humblesmith |
| **Best Song of the Year**: **"Pick Up" – Adekunle Gold**; "You Suppose Know" – Bez; "Type of Woman" – Iyanya; "Go On" – Niyola; "Oluwa Ni" – Reekado Banks; "The Vow" – Timi Dakolo | **Afropop Artist of the Year**: **Kiss Daniel**; Chidinma; Davido; Tiwa Savage; Tekno Miles; Wizkid |
| **R&B Artist of the Year**: **Seyi Shay**; Dare Art Alade; Iyanya; Niyola; Praiz; Waje | **Rap Act of the Year**: **Olamide**; CDQ; M.I; Phyno; Reminisce; Vector |
| **Gospel Artist of the Year**: **Frank Edwards**; Nikki Laoye; Sammy Okposo; Obiwon; Onos Brisibi; Uche Agu | **Dancehall Artist of the Year**: **Ketchup**; Burna Boy; Cynthia Morgan; Ceeza; Timaya; Patoranking |
| **Indigenous Artist of the Year**: **Flavour N'abania**; 9ice; Tillaman; Jaywon; Olu Maintain | **Alternative Artist of the Year**: **Aramide**; Brymo; Bez; Mystro; Temi Dollface; Timi Dakolo |
| **Best New Act**: **Adekunle Gold**; Mz Kiss; Humblesmith; Niniola; Ycee; Toby Grey | **Most Promising Act to Watch**: **Mr Eazi**; Coco Benson; Spyz; Shobzy; Teeblaq; Terry Apala |
| **Diaspora Artist of the Year**: **Ayo Jay**; Mr Eazi; Duncan Daniels; Lioness; SHiiKANE; Stylezz | **Collaboration of the Year**: **"My Woman, My Everything" – Patoranking ft. Wande Coal**; "Romantic" – Korede Bello ft. Tiwa Savage; "Reggae Blues" – Harrysong ft. Olamide, Iyanya & Orezi; "Yaya Oyoyo" – Lil Kesh ft. Davido; "Finally" – Masterkraft ft. Sarkodie & Flavour; "Your Number" – Ayo Jay ft. Fetty Wap; "Sekem" – MC Galaxy ft. Swizz Beatz |
| **Best Live Performer**: **2Baba**; Omawumi; D'banj; Yemi Alade; MC Galaxy; Solidstar | **Music Video of the Year (Director)**: **Unlimited L.A – "Emergency" by D'banj**; Meji Alabi – "Right Now" by Seyi Shay; Aje Films – "Karashika" by Falz; Chad Tennies – "Sisi" by Sexy Steel; Patrick Elis – "Duro" by Tekno Miles; Moe Musa – "Condo" by Kuammy; CP – "If I Start to Talk" by Tiwa Savage; HG2 – "Quality" by Pasuma |
| **African Male Artist of the Year (Non Nigerian)**: **(Ghana) Shatta Wale**; (Liberia) FA; (Ghana) Sarkodie; (Liberia) Eric Geso; (Kenya) Papa Denis; (Liberia) DenG; (Kenya) Sauti Sol | **African Female Artist of the Year (Non Nigerian)**: **(Ghana) Efya**; (South Africa) Lira; (Ghana) MzVee; (Uganda) Sheebah Karungi; (Kenya) Victoria Kimani; (Tanzania) Vanessa Mdee; (Rwanda) Knowless; (Senegal) Adiouza |
**Music Producer of the Year**: **Masterkraft**; DJ Coublon; Cobhams Asuquo; Mystro; Young John; Jay Pizzle

=== Film/TV categories ===
| **Lead Actor in a Film**: **Joseph Benjamin** – **Rebecca**; IK Ogbonna – Stop; Julius Agwu – Wives on Strike; Ramsey Nouah – Gbomo Gbomo Express; Femi Jacobs – Taxi Driver: Oko Ashewo; Daniel K. Daniel – A Soldier's Story | **Supporting Actor in a Film**: **Sambasa Nzeribe** – A Soldier's Story; Afeez Oyetoro – Taxi Driver: Oko Ashewo; Desmond Elliot – Falling; Femi Jacobs – The Visit; Tope Tedela – Surulere; Olumide Oworu – A Soldier's Story |
| **Lead Actress in a Film**: **Fathia Balogun** – **Ishanna**; Genevieve Nnaji – Road to Yesterday; Adesua Etomi – Falling; Belinda Efah – Stop; Omoni Oboli – Wives on Strike; Nse Ikpe-Etim – The Visit | **Supporting Actress in a Film**: **Osas Ighodaro** – **Gbomo Gbomo Express**; Beverly Naya – Surulere; Rita Dominic – Surulere; Linda Ejiofor – A Soldier's Story; Chioma Omeruah – Road to Yesterday; Kehinde Bankole – Wives on Strike |
| **Film Director of the Year**: **Frankie Ogar** – **A Soldier's Story**; Ishaya Bako – Road to Yesterday; Akin Omotoso – Tell Me Sweet Something; Niyi Akinmolayan – Falling; Salisu Balarabe – Dadin Kowa; Walter Taylaur – Gbomo Gbomo Express | **Best Picture of the Year**: **Ishanna**; A Soldier's Story; Wives on Strike; Tell Me Sweet Something; Taxi Driver: Oko Ashewo; Road to Yesterday |
| **Best Short Film of the Year**: **Bloody Taxi** – **Folasakin Iwajomo**; The Encounter – Tolu Ajayi; Child Soldier – Folasakin Iwajomo; Good People Dead – Nodash; Brave – LowlaDee; Hell or High Water – Oluseyi Amuwa | **Best Actor of the Year (TV)**: **Folarin Falana** – **Jenifa's Diary**; Richard Mofe Damijo – Hush; Basorge Tariah Jr – Do Good; Kelechi Udegbe – Officer Titus; Keppy Ekpeyong – Festac Town; OC Ukeje – Before 30 |
| **Best Actress (TV)**: **Abimbola Craig** – Skinny Girl in Transit; Oge Okoye – Festac Town; Kate Henshaw – Do Good; Funke Akindele – Jenifa's Diary; Ini Edo – Desperate House Girls; Beverly Naya – Before 30 | **TV Show of the Year**: **Skinny Girl in Transit**; Festac Town; Baby's Daddy; Jennifer's Diary; Officer Titus; Do Good |
| **Actor of the Year (Non-Nigerian)**: **Abraham Attah** – **Beast of No Nation**; Henry Adofo – Freetown; Van Vicker – A Long Night; Chris Attoh – Happiness is a Four Letter Word; Idris Elba – Beast of No Nation; Majid Michel – The Department | **Actress of the Year (Non-Nigerian)**: **Nuong Faalong** – **Freetown**; Nana Mensah – An African City; Yvonne Okoro – Rebecca; Fulu Mugovhani – Ayanda; Faridah Kuteesa – House Arrest; Ama K. Abebrese – Beast of No Nation |
**Best Picture (Non-Nigerian)**: **Beast of No Nation**; Silverain; House Arrest; Freetown; Ayanda; Rebecca

=== Other categories ===
| **Disk Jockey of the Year (Male)**: **DJ Gravpop**; DJ Enimoney; DJ Tunez; DJ Vinnie; DJ TTB; DJ Kelvin | **Disk Jockey of the Year (Female)**: **DJ Mystelle**; DJ Lambo; DJ Nana; DJ Sensie Lo; DJ Soupamodel; DJ Switch |
| **Disk Jockey Collaboration of the Year**: **DJ Kaywise ft. Oritse Femi – "Warn Dem"**; DJ Shabzy ft. Kiss Daniel & Sugarboi – "Raba"; DJ Spinall ft. Yemi Alade – "Pepe Dem"; DJ Jimmy Jatt ft. Wizkid – Feeling the Beat"; DJ Kentalky ft. Lil Kesh – Blessings; DJ Xclusive ft. Cassper Nyovest, Sarkodie, Anatii & Banky W – Cash Only | **Disk Jockey of the Year (Non-Nigerian)**: **DJ Slick Stuart & Roja**; DJ Lebbie; DJ Bossman; DJ Mensah; DJ Vyrusky; DJ Joe Mfalme |
| **Music Executive of the Year**: **Don Jazzy (Mavin Records)**; Ubi Franklin (MMMG); E-Money (Five Star Music); Ossi Chiori (Achievas Entertainment); Steve Baba Eko (Xtreme Music); Okwudili Umenyiora (Eric-Manny Entertainment) | **Radio OAP of the Year**: **Tisan Jeremiah Bako (Raypower FM)**; Teddy Don-Momoh (Star FM); Ushbebe (Naija FM); Igos (Wazobia FM); Toke Makinwa (Rhythm FM); N6 (Cool FM) |
| **TV Presenter of the Year (Lifestyle)**: **Daala (Ovation)**; Ehiz (MTV Base); Eku Edewor (53 Extra); VJ Adams (Soundcity); Nansy Isime (HipTV); Bolanle Olukanni (EL) | **Comedy Act of the Year**: **Basketmouth**; I Go Dye; AY; Seyi Law; Ushbebe; Akpororo |
| **Fashion Model of the Year**: **Mayowa Nicholas**; Uju Marshall; Ndigwe Victor; Akpede Oghenekevwe; Kwen Akomaye; Opeyemi Awoyemi | **Online Comedy Act of the Year**: **Emmanuella**; Crazeclown; Chief Obi; Foxy P; Worwor Boyz; Iya Ibadan |
