= Applaudise =

Studio album by Iyanya
- Released: 19 September 2015
- Recorded: 2014–2015
- Genre: Afrobeats; R&B
- Length: 72:00
- Language: English; Nigerian Pidgin; Swahili
- Label: Made Men
- Producer: Mystro; London Boys; DJ Coublon; Princeton; Selebobo; Dr. Amir; Spellz; Tee-Y Mix; Blaq Jerzee; Mr. Chidoo

Iyanya chronology
The Evolution (2014)	Applaudise (2015)	Signature (2017)

Singles from Applaudise
- 1. "Mr Oreo" Released: 4 June 2014; 2. "Gift" Released: 24 January 2015; 3. "Nakupenda" Released: 19 February 2015; 4. "Applaudise" Released: 19 April 2015; 5. "Okamfo" Released: 19 September 2015; 6. "Yoga" Released: 31 August 2016

Applaudise is the third studio album by Nigerian singer and songwriter Iyanya. It was released on 19 September 2015 by Made Men Music Group. The album features guest appearances from Olamide, Lil Kesh, Victoria Kimani, Kcee, Sarkodie, Diamond Platnumz, Don Jazzy, Patoranking, Efya, Harrysong, MC Galaxy, Seyi Shay, Mystro, Banky W., Tekno and Selebobo. Production was handled by Mystro, London Boys, Blaq Jerzee, Mr. Chidoo, Dr. Amir, Selebobo, Princeton, Spellz, and DJ Coublon. Applaudise was nominated for Album of the Year at the 2016 Nigeria Entertainment Awards.

== Singles ==
The album's lead single "Mr Oreo", formerly titled "Mr Orio", was released commercially on iTunes on 4 June 2014. The song was originally on the Made Men Music Group collaborative album, The Evolution (2014) and was produced, mixed, mastered and engineered by Selebobo. The music video for "Mr Oreo" was released on 23 September 2014 and directed by Mega Boi in Brooklyn, New York City. The album's second single "Gift" features Nigerian singer, producer, songwriter and record executive Don Jazzy and was released unannounced on 24 January 2015. The music video for "Gift" was released on 6 March 2015 and shot in South Africa by an uncredited director.

The third single from Applaudise, "Nakupenda" (which means "I love you" in Swahili), features Diamond Platnumz and was produced by Mr. Chidoo. It was officially released on 19 February 2015, after initially being leaked under the title "Nakupenda (Remember)" on 17 February 2015. The music video was directed by Patrick Elis and released on 1 June 2015. The DJ Coublon-produced title track, "Applaudise", was released as the fourth single off the album on 19 April 2015. The music video for "Applaudise" was released on 13 July 2015 and directed by Aje Filmworks. "Okamfo" featuring Lil Kesh was released as the album's fifth single on 19 September 2015, coinciding with its release. "Yoga" was released on 31 August 2016 as the sixth single off Applaudise; it features Victoria Kimani and was produced by DJ Coublon.

== Critical reception ==
The album received mixed reviews from critics. Joey Akan of Pulse Nigeria called Applaudise an album built on "simplistic African sounds" that "perfectly captures the state of pop music in Nigeria", praising its cultural diversity and celebratory mood, while concluding that it is "made for the moment, for the money, and for the clubs", rating it 3 out of 5. Writing for 360nobs, Wilfred Okiche criticized Applaudise as a "directionless" album that relied too heavily on "danceable beats" and the "hit single formula", concluding that "Mr Mbuk gets no applause. Just knocks."

In a review for Music in Africa, Oris Aigbokhaevbolo described Applaudise as a dance-oriented album that prioritized "stellar dance-beat production" and largely succeeded in its intention to make listeners dance, though he questioned its artistic direction, writing that "Applaudise should be called Dance" and suggesting Iyanya's "talent" had gone "to a dancing waste." Sho and Tunde of Should You Bump This described Applaudise as a "watered down and poor" album, criticizing its production and lyrics, stating that "the good songs have already been put out as singles" and that Iyanya "needs to go and hit that reset button", while rating it 1.5/5.

=== Accolades ===
Awards and nominations for Applaudise
Organization	Year	Category	Result	Ref.
Nigeria Entertainment Awards	2016	Album of the Year	Nominated	

== Track listing ==
Applaudise track listing
No.	Title	Writer(s)	Producer(s)	Length
1.	"Wambi"	Iyanya Mbuk	Mystro	3:24
2.	"Baby Daddy" (remix; featuring Banky W.)	Mbuk; Olubankole Wellington	London Boys	3:09
3.	"Mama"	Mbuk	DJ Coublon	3:50
4.	"Macoma" (featuring Efya and Sarkodie)	Mbuk; Jane Awindor; Michael Addo	DJ Coublon	3:36
5.	"Awade" (featuring Dammy Krane)	Mbuk; Oyindamola Emmanuel	Princeton	3:31
6.	"Again" (featuring Seyi Shay)	Mbuk; Oluwaseyi Joshua	DJ Coublon	3:18
7.	"Egwu" (featuring Mystro)	Mbuk; Michael Ajayi	Mystro	3:07
8.	"Ocho" (featuring Tekno and Selebobo)	Mbuk; Augustine Kelechi; Udoka Oku	Selebobo	3:58
9.	"Psychology" (featuring Harrysong)	Mbuk; Harrison Okiri	Dr. Amir	3:26
10.	"Okamfor" (featuring Lil Kesh)	Mbuk; Keshinro Ololade	Princeton	3:20
11.	"Loko"	Mbuk	Blaq Jerzee	3:45
12.	"Turn It Up" (featuring Olamide)	Mbuk; Adedeji	Spellz	3:16
13.	"Ufan" (featuring Kcee and MC Galaxy)	Mbuk; Kingsley Okonkwo; Innocent Udofot	Princeton	3:50
14.	"Mogbe" (featuring Patoranking)	Mbuk; Patrick Okorie	DJ Coublon	3:58
15.	"Commotion"	Mbuk	Tee-Y Mix	3:16
16.	"Applaudise"	Mbuk	DJ Coublon	3:45
17.	"Gift" (featuring Don Jazzy)	Mbuk; Michael Ajereh	Blaq Jerzee	4:20
18.	"Mr. Oreo"	Mbuk	Selebobo	3:44
19.	"Yoga" (featuring Victoria Kimani)	Mbuk; Victoria Kimani	DJ Coublon	3:30
20.	"Nakupenda" (featuring Diamond Platnumz)	Mbuk; Naseeb Juma	Mr. Chidoo	3:52
Total length:				72:00

== Personnel ==
- Selebobo – production
- Mystro – production
- DJ Coublon – production
- Tee-Y Mix - production
- Blaq Jerzee – production
- Dr. Amir – production
- Princeton – production
- Spellz – production
- Mr. Chidoo – production
- London Boys – production
- Prince Meyson – photography
- iCrea8Media – album art
- Ubi Franklin – executive production

== Release history ==
Release history and formats for Applaudise
Region	Date	Format	Label
Various	19 September 2015	CD; digital download	Made Men
