= CDQ =

CDQ may refer to:

- Cardiff Queen Street railway station, Wales, station code
- Compact Disc Quiz, a television programme
- CDQ (rapper), Nigerian rapper
- Convert Double-word to Quad-word, an x86 instruction
