= Ebbe Bassey =

Nigerian American actress

- Born: New York
- Occupation: Actress
- Years active: 1997 to present
- Spouse: Mark Manczuk

Ebbe Bassey is a Nigerian American actress, who was nominated for Africa Movie Academy Award for Best Actress in a Supporting Role for playing "Maa Dede" in Ties That Bind (2011).

== Career ==
Bassey has starred in many Nigerian and American films, including Doctor Bello, Mother of George, NYPD Blue, etc. She received a best-supporting actress nomination for her role in Ties That Bind (film). In 2012, she announced plans to create a short film, Saving Father, which was to advocate and increase awareness for people living with AIDS. At the 2013 Nigeria Entertainment Awards, Bassey was nominated as the best-supporting actress in a film. In 2012, Bassey acted in Turning Point. The film won awards at Nollywood and African Film Critics Awards in the United States. In 2016, she played "Imani" in Tomorrow Ever After and got positive reviews for her role in the film. Bassey co-hosted the 2016 Nigeria Entertainment Awards with Richard Mofe-Damijo at BMCC Tribeca Performing Arts Center, New York. she was among the Nigerian Entertainment Award announced 2013 nominees.

== Filmography ==
- Ties That Bind (2011)
- Turning Point (2012) as Renee
- Mother of George (2013) as Yinka
- Tomorrow Ever After (2017) as Imani
- Nigerian Prince (2018) as Mercy

== Personal life ==
Bassey was born in the United States but spent her teenage years in Calabar before relocating permanently. She is married to Mark Manczuk.
