= Your Number =

"Your Number" may refer to:

- "Your Number" (Ayo Jay song)
- "Your Number" (Shinee song)
