= Lynox =

Nigerian singer-songwriter

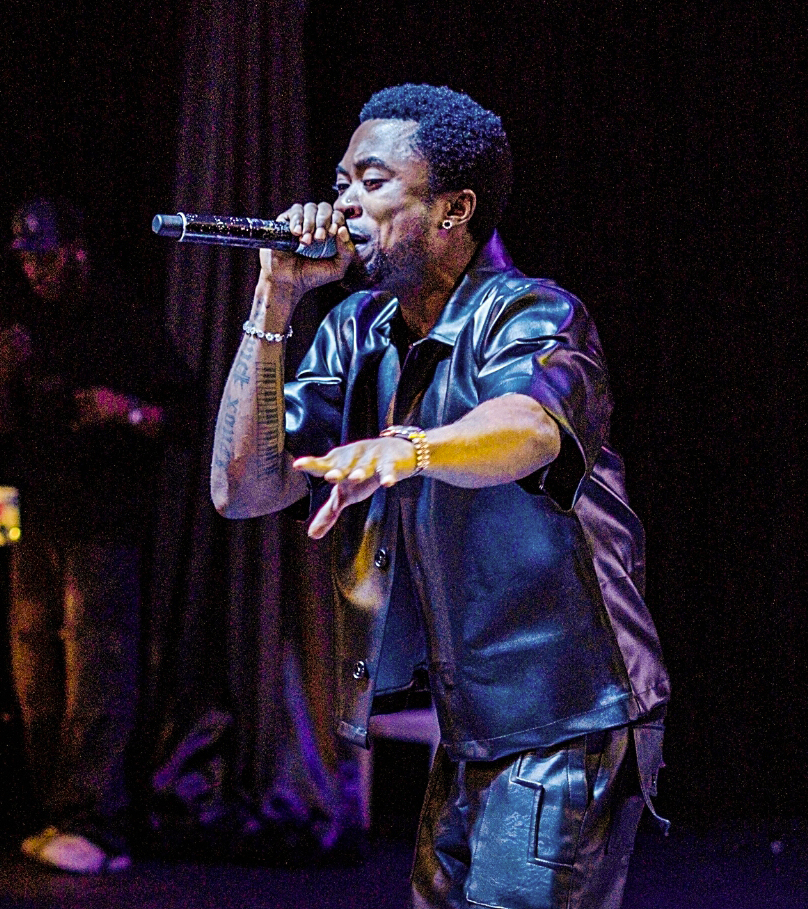

Background information
- Born: Adindu Linus Nnamdi; December 17, 1996 (age 29); Ajegunle, Lagos, Nigeria
- Origin: Abia state, Nigeria
- Occupations: Singer, songwriter
- Years active: 2010–present
- Labels: General Records(former); Empire Distribution

Adindu Linus Nnamdi (born 17 December 1996), known professionally as Lynox, is a Birmingham-based Nigerian singer and songwriter. He rose to fame after being featured on "Gbagbe" by Masterkraft featuring CDQ, before becoming a member of the music duo Playaz in the late 2010s. The group released two extended plays, Friendship (2019) and Playsound (2020).

Lynox gained wider recognition with the release of his 2022 single "Big Body Benz". He often worked with Masterkraft and collaborated with artists like Bracket, 1da Banton, Zlatan Ibile, Fiokee, and Xbusta.

Lynox's first solo EP, Love & Herbs, was released in 2026 and received mixed reception.

== Early life and career ==
1996–2017: Early life and career beginnings

Adindu Linus Nnamdi was born December 17, 1996, in Ajegunle, Lagos State, Nigeria. He studied at Abia State University, where he earned a bachelor's degree in Political Science and later obtained a master's degree in Public Administration. He developed a passion for music early and began singing in church.

Lynox developed an interest in poetry at an early age and later began rapping. During his early career, he recorded freestyle performances over songs by artists including M.I Abaga, Ice Prince, Vector, Phenom, Labzy Lawal, Dark Poet, 12Guage, and the duo P-Square. In 2010, he also appeared on the freestyle television program Jimmy's Jump Off hosted by DJ Jimmy Jatt.

Lynox began his professional music career in 2013 with the release of the single "Wa Gba". In 2016, he gained further recognition through collaborations with the music producer Masterkraft. He was featured on Masterkraft's single "Gbagbe", and later that same year appeared on another collaboration titled "Igwe". Beyond his featured appearances, Lynox has also worked as a songwriter. He co-wrote "Overdose" for Masterkraft and contributed to "Sun Seyin" for CDQ. He was also involved in writing "Roll Up" for DJ Derek, which featured Flavour and CDQ, and wrote "Loke" for SHiiKANE which went viral.

=== 2018–2022: Playaz ===
In 2018, Lynox and Gabana formed the music duo Playaz, serving as its lead singers and songwriters. The group gained early recognition with the single "Mad Oh" featuring Zlatan Ibile. The track circulated across Nigerian street circles and social media platforms, eventually drawing the attention of American rapper Cardi B. The duo produced their second EP, Playsound, in 2020, which received general positive reviews. That same year they were featured on a song, Yawa (Remix) feat. KiDi. In 2022 they released "Desólé" featuring 1da Banton. In 2020, he won the City People Entertainment Award for Outstanding New Artist and also received a nomination for Revelation of the Year.

=== 2022–present: Solo years ===
On March 25, 2022, Lynox released "Big Body Benz" featuring Xbusta as the first single after going solo, it peaked at number seven on the UK Apple Top 50 Songs chart, and number 13 on the African iTunes chart. He released a Latin-styled remix of the song, featuring Bobby Moon, DJ Alex Watanabe, and DJ PJAY. That same year he released the song, "Te Amo," featuring Singah. In the same year, he released "Better Love" and "Marijuana." In 2023, he was featured on "Vow" by Xbusta, which appeared on the album Xuper Xtar Xtatus (XXX).

On 11 June 2024, Lynox signed a deal with Empire Distribution. The same day, he announced his departure from the group Playaz in order to pursue a solo career. He expressed appreciation to his former partner and described the move as the beginning of a new phase in his career. In the spring of 2024, Lynox released two single titled "Stay With Me (Lewu)" and "Run With Me". In 2025, he released the song "Luv You Bad" produced by Grammy-nominated producer Shugavybz published by EMPIRE.

Lynox released Love & Herbs, a four-track extended play, in 2026. The EP incorporates reggae and explores themes of love, and nature. In an interview with Rolling Stone Africa, he described the project as a "period of personal and creative reflection."

== Discography ==
=== EPs ===
List of studio extended plays, with Playaz selected details
Title	Details
Playsound	Released: 2020; Formats: Digital download, streaming
Friendship	Released: 2019; Formats: Digital download, streaming

=== Extended play ===
List of EPs as Solo artist
Title	Music Details	Year released
Love & Herbs	Released: 14 August 2026; Number of Tracks: 4; Label: Empire Distribution, Lynox Music; Formats:Digital download, streaming	2026

=== Singles ===
List of singles, with selected details
Title	Year	Album
"Wa Gba"	2013	Non-album single
If No Be You (with. Masterkraft)	2016	Non-album single
"Marijuana"	2022	Love & Herbs
"Better Love	2022	Non-album single
"Te Amo" (with. Singah)	2022	Non-album single
"Big Body Benz" (with. Xbusta)	2022	Non-album single
"Run With Me"	2024	TBA
"Stay With Me (Lewu)"	2024	TBA
"Luv You Bad"	2025	TBA

List of singles as a featured artist, with selected seleted details
Artist	Title	Year	Album
Masterkraft (featuring Lynox, CDQ & GabanaBwoy)	"Gbagbe"	2016	TBA
CDQ (featuring Lynox & GabanaBwoy)	"One time"	2016	TBA
Masterkraft (featuring Lynox )	"Igwe"	2016	TBA
Phenom (featuring Lynox )	"International"	2017	TBA
XBusta (featuring Bracket, Playaz & Fiokee)	"Soto"	2017	TBA
Royal Pixy (featuring Playaz)	"Asante"	2019	TBA
XBusta (featuring Lynox )	"Vow"	2026	TBA

== Songwriting credits ==
Song title, original artist, album of release, and year of release
Song	Artist(s)	Writer(s)	Year	Note(s)	Ref.
"Overdose"	Masterkraft	Lynox	2018	Co-wrote	
"Loke"	Shiikane	Lynox, Shay & Annamay	2017	Wrote	
"Roll Up" Sun Seyin	DJ Derek (featuring CDQ & Flavour)	Lynox, Flavour	2016	Co-wrote	
"Sun Seyin"	CDQ	Sodiq Yusuf, Lynox	2016	Co-wrote	

== Filmography ==
List of television shows, showing year aired, character played and notes
Year	TV show	Role	Notes	Ref.
2010	Jimmy's Jump Off	Himself	Guest	

== Awards and nominations ==
Year	Award	Category	Result	Ref.
2020	City People Entertainment Awards	Revelation of the Year	Nominated	
2020	City People Entertainment Awards	Citypeople Outstanding New Artist of the year	Won	
