= Xbusta =

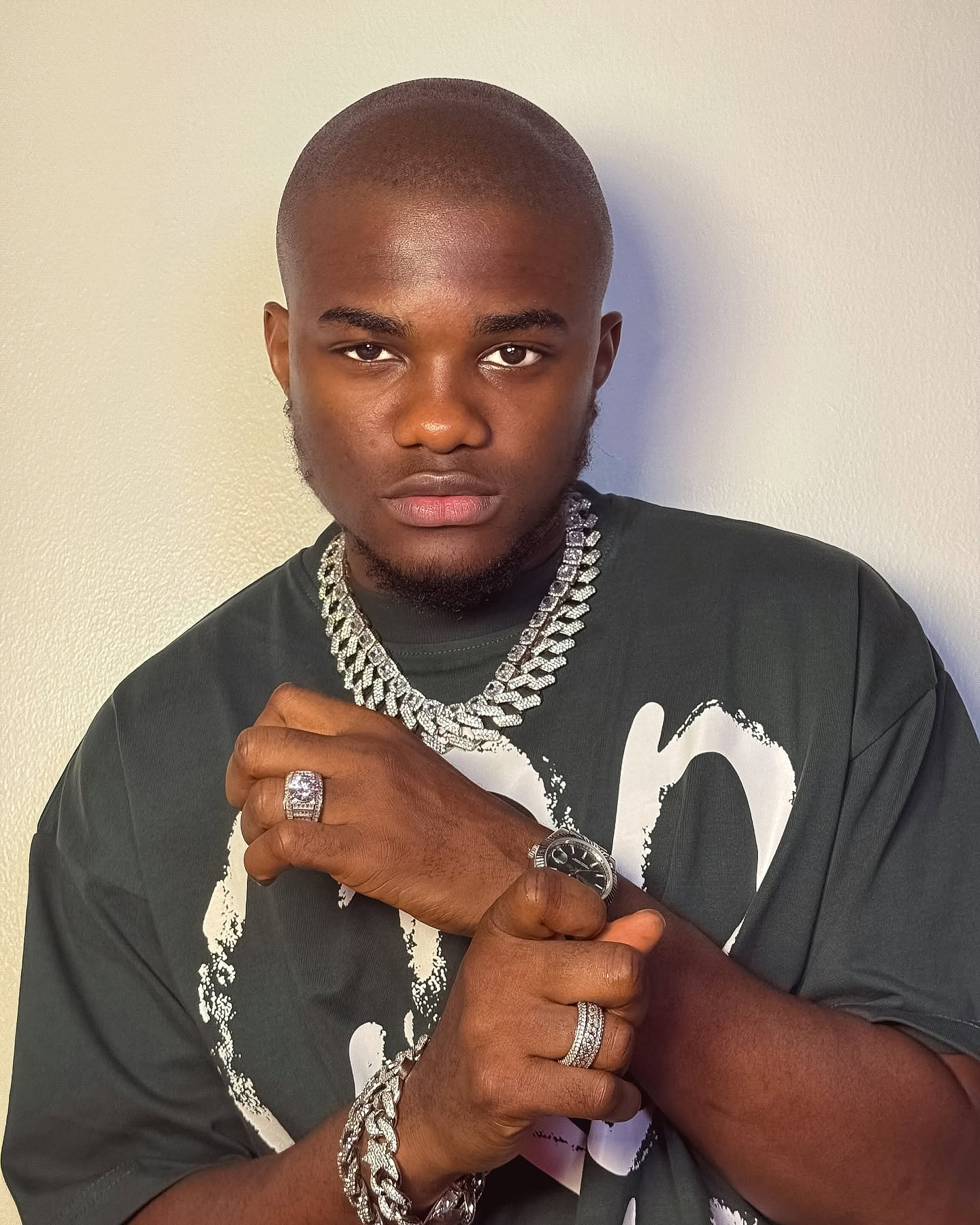

Background information
- Born: Okafor Golden Chinedu; 27 February 1994 (age 32); Lagos
- Genres: Hip hop; Afrobeat; Afropop
- Occupations: Rapper; singer; songwriter
- Years active: 2013–present
- Label: Take Over Time Entertainment

Okafor Golden Chinedu best known as Xbusta is a Nigerian Afrobeat rapper, singer, and songwriter signed to Take Over Time Entertainment. He was formerly signed to Five Star Music. He was first discovered by M.I Abaga in 2013 at the Star Trek Music concert in Owerri, and was endorsed by Dr SID in Abeokuta on stage, a month after he was discovered by M.I.

Xbusta gained initial recognition while signed to Five Star Music. His 2020 debut EP Discovery received positive reviews. He was featured on Lynox's "Big Body Benz", which became a major record in Nigeria after the TikTok creators began using the song in their videos.

== Early life and career ==
Okafor Golden Chinedu was born on 27 February 1994 in Lagos State. He is Igbo and hails from Imo State in one of the 33 communities in Orlu, which is the second-largest city in the South East. He had his primary and secondary education in Lagos State. Golden relocated to Imo State for his tertiary education, where he studied Estate Management at Imo State University, and graduated with a BSc in Estate Management. At 22, he began his music career professionally in Obalende, a neighborhood in Lagos.

Xbusta was discovered by the Nigerian rapper M.I Abaga in 2013 at the Star Trek Music concert. After his discovery, he enjoyed local success at Imo State, and while in the University he signed a record deal with Valencia Records. Once he left the label, he signed with Five Star Music in 2016, and released "Mother Anybody" with an accompanying video. On 12 October 2016, Xbusta was announced on the line up for Felabration, alongside other rap artist Falz, Dremo, CDQ, and Eedris Abdulkareem.

In 2017, he joined Kcee for Attention To Detail Album Tour. and left Five Star Music in 2018, shortly after the tour ended. In October 2018, he signed a multi-million publishing deal with Runway Entertainment and released "Billion Dollars", distributed by Five Star Music. In 2019, he released "Somebody Crush" featuring Peruzzi, which debuted at number 9 on the iTunes Nigeria chart, through Runway Entertainment. In the same year, Xbusta and the American music group Playaz, released a joint extended play titled Friendship.

In 2020, Xbusta launched his record label Take Over Time Entertainment, and released a new version of "Somebody Crush" featuring Peruzzi and Skiibii. On 20 November 2020, the music video for "Somebody Crush" with Peruzzi and Skiibii, was directed by Naya and premiered on Trace Naija. On 4 December 2020, he released his first solo extended play titled Discovery through Take Over Time Entertainment and distributed by Dvpper Music. The project spawned the hit tracks "Somebody Crush", "Body Lotion", and "Oh".

On 25 March 2022, Lynox with Xbusta released "Big Body Benz". The song began to trend on TikTok in Nigeria and was supported by a Latin version titled "Big Body BeLatinatin remix)" with Bobby Moon, DJ Alex Watanabe, and DJ PJAY. On 12 August 2022, he released "My Lover". On 30 September 2022, he released "Every Girl’s Boyfriend". On 1 October 2022, Pulse Nigeria listed the song on its Future Sounds Vol.26 playlist. On 15 December 2022, Xbusta released an Afropop fused Latin pop single titled "Te Quiero".

On 27 February 2023, he released "1 Billi" with Majeeed, as the second lead single off his first studio album Xuper Xtar Xtatus (XXX). On 23 March 2023, Xbusta released the visual video for "1 Billi" with Majeeed and directed by D6ix. On 14 April 2023, he released his debut studio album Xuper Xtar Xtatus (XXX), independently through Camille Storm's Camille & Co. Distro (also known as CNC Distro), with guest appearances from Majeeed, Lynox, Jaywillz, Singah, Lyta, Slowdog, and Duncan Mighty.

In 2023, Xbusta held his first concert in Lagos titled Xbusta Live in Concert at Terra Kulture in Victoria Island. With performers line-up, featuring Ice Prince, Majeeed, Hotkid, Lyta, Efe, DanDizzy, and Jaywillz. On 8 December 2023, Xbusta released "Every Girl’s Boyfriend (remix)" featuring Ice Prince. On 27 February 2024, he released the music video directed by GorillaBoy and premiered on MTV Base. It also debuted on MTV Base's Official Naija Top 10. On 25 April 2024, Xbusta released "Ma Pami" featuring Shatta Wale.

On 26 September 2024, Xbusta released "Work", independently and distributed by Azuri. On 30 September 2024, he launched a creative competition on Instagram with the hashtag #wakeupnwork, with the winning prize of 1 million naira to be shared among 10 users (100k each). On 9 November 2024, he held the second edition of Xbusta Live in Concert in Lagos at Terra Kulture in Victoria Island. With performers line-up, featuring Ice Prince, Majeeed, DanDizzy, Hotkid, Lyta, Peruzzi, Efe, Pryme, Skales, Lynox, and Alax Evalsam. On 23 May 2025, he released "First Class". On 6 June 2025, he released his third extended play Workaholic, independently. On 13 November 2025, HipTV confirmed his upcoming third Lagos concert titled "XBusta Live in Concert 3.0", held on 23 November 2025, at Terra Kulture.

Xbusta credits artists such Cassidy, Jay-Z and 2pac.

== Discography ==
- Discovery (2020 EP)
- Xuper Xtar Xtatus (XXX) (2023 LP)

== Concerts ==
- Xbusta Live in Concert – Lagos (2023)
- Owerri Homecoming Concert (with London Jay) - Owerri (2023)
- Xbusta Live in Concert 2.0 – Lagos (2024)
- Xbusta Live in Concert 3.0 – Lagos (2025)

=== Co-headlining ===
- Tiger Street Food Festival (2021)

=== Supporting ===
- Owerri Must Laugh (2015)
- Felabration (2016)
- Attention To Detail Album Tour (2017)
- RuggedConcert (2017)
- Rhythm (2017)
