= Linda Dominguez =

Nigerian publisher

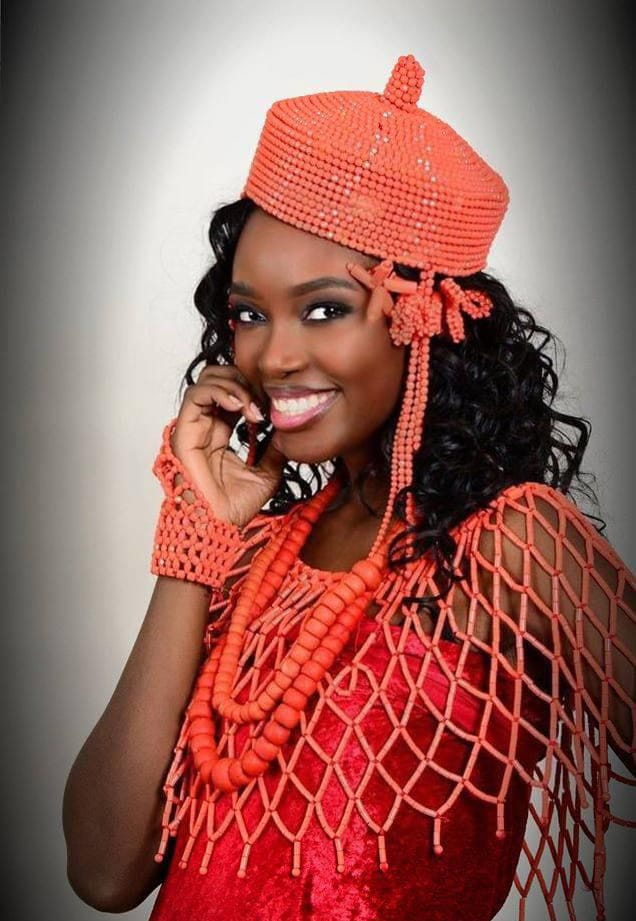
- Born: Linda Enakeme Ofukeme; Benin, Edo State
- Other names: Senora K; Naijalife
- Education: Nassau Community College
- Years active: 1990s-present
- Known for: Founding Naijalife Magazine & Nigeria Entertainment Awards
- Website: www.naijalifemagazine.com

Linda Enakeme Dominguez (née Ofukeme), also known as Senora K, or Naijalife is a Nigerian publisher, public relations officer and tourism promoter. Dominguez serves as an ambassador for FIA Girls on Track in Nigeria and is a member of the FIA GT Racing Commission. In 2006, Dominguez founded the Nigeria Entertainment Awards.

== Early life and education ==
Originally from Isoko in Delta State, Dominguez was born to the family of Ofukeme in Benin, Edo State and grew up in Lagos. She later relocated to New York to further her education.

Dominguez earned her High School Diploma (GED) from Jamaica Learning Centre in New York and proceeded to Nassau Community College in Long Island where she earned an associate degree in Digital Technology and Visual Communications. During her time at Nassau Community College, she became the Phi Theta Kappa Honor Society member, and also edited for the Nassau Community College newspaper as an arts editor. She is also an alumna of Houston Community College.

== Career ==
Dominguez started her career in publishing as a teenager while she was editing for Nassau Community College's newspaper while studying at the college. As a model she worked with Maybelline, and Couture Fashion Week amongst others. In 2006, Linda created the Nigeria Entertainment Awards and executive produced the inaugural edition. The following year, she officially registered Naijalife magazine in Houston, Texas.

Currently, Dominguez is the head of PR and marketing for Automobile and Touring Club of Nigeria and was the former Head of PR and social event director for BMW Club of Nigeria. She also serves as the head of delegation for Team Racing (Motorsport) Nigeria for the 2024 FIA Motorsport Games and as the Nigeria communications manager for FIA Motorsport games 2022/2024.

As an actress, Dominguez debuted as an extra in the 1998 comedy drama series Sex and the City season 6, and appeared in 2 episodes. She also appeared in Kal Ho Naa Ho and Nollywood movie, This America. She has also appeared in ABC Eyewitness News, and Univision TV, amongst others.
