= Doctor Bello =

2013 Nigerian Adventure drama

- Theatrical poster
- Directed by: Tony Abulu
- Written by: Tony Abulu
- Produced by: Tony Abulu
- Starring: Isaiah Washington; Vivica A. Fox; Genevieve Nnaji; Stephanie Okereke; Jimmy Jean-Louis
- Cinematography: Scott St. John
- Production company: Black Ivory Communications
- Distributed by: AMC Theatres
- Release date: 22 February 2013 (U.S.)
- Running time: 95 minutes
- Countries: Nigeria; United States
- Languages: English; Yoruba

Doctor Bello is a 2013 Nigerian adventure drama film directed by Tony Abulu starring Isaiah Washington, Vivica A. Fox, Jimmy Jean-Louis, Genevieve Nnaji, Stephanie Okereke, Justus Esiri, Ebbe Bassey and Jon Freda.

== Cast ==
- Isaiah Washington as Doctor Michael Durant
- Vivica A. Fox as Chloe Durant
- Jimmy Jean-Louis as Doctor Bello
- Genevieve Nnaji as Doctor Eniola
- Stephanie Okereke as Bola Ayodeji
- Justus Esiri
- Ebbe Bassey as Nurse Helen Obi
- Jon Freda as Doctor Kissick
- Bern Cohen as Doctor Bernstein
- Victor Browne as David Stein
- Andrea Leigh as Doctor Diane Spector
- Linda Perhach as Nurse Grace Markowitz
- Evan Brinkman as Sam Stein
- Femi Brainard as Ade Ayodeji
- Jide Kosoko as Corporal Olurin
- Olumide Bakare as Chief Idowu
- Racheal Oniga as Denrele

== See also ==
- List of Nigerian films of 2013
