= Uju Marshall =

Nigerian freelance fashion model

- Born: Uju Marshall Nwobodoh; 1990 (age 35–36); Enugu State, Nigeria
- Occupations: model; photographer
- Years active: 2009–present
- Modeling information
- Height: 6 ft (183 cm)
- Hair color: Black
- Eye color: Brown

Uju Marshall Nwobodoh, professionally referred to as Uju Marshall, is a Nigerian freelance fashion model who was named MTN Model of the Year at the 2014 Lagos Fashion and Design Week.

== Life and career ==
She was born in Enugu State, Eastern Nigeria. She started modelling in 2009 while in Enugu State where she was scouted by Denrele Edun before she moved to Lagos State to professionally pursue a career in modelling. Her career so far has seen her cover magazines and being the face of fashion brands including Orange Culture, French fashion magazine L'Insense and Union Bank of Nigeria; among others. In 2016, she was nominated in the Fashion Model category at the 2016 Nigeria Entertainment Awards.

== Awards and nominations ==
Year	Award ceremony	Prize	Result	Ref
2014	Lagos Fashion & Design Week	MTN Model of the Year	Won	
2016	2016 Nigeria Entertainment Awards	Fashion Model	Nominated	
