= Ayo Jay =

Nigerian singer (born 1989)

- Born: Ayoola Ogundeyi Jr. 9 August 1989 (age 37); London, England
- Citizenship: Nigeria; United Kingdom
- Education: Baruch College
- Occupations: Singer, songwriter
- Years active: 2011–present
- Musical career
- Genres: Afropop
- Instrument: Vocals
- Labels: One Nation, RCA

Ayoola Ogundeyi Jr. (born 9 August 1989), better known as Ayo Jay, is an English-born Nigerian singer. He currently has a record deal with One Nation and RCA, and is also known as Boy Wonder.

== Early life ==
Ayo Jay discovered his abilities for singing and songwriting at a young age. After graduating from International School, Lagos (ISL) in 2006, Ayo Jay relocated to the United States to pursue a college degree in finance and investment from Baruch College.

== Career ==
In 2013, Ayo Jay signed a recording deal with One Nation Records and released "Your Number" on 21 June 2013. The music video for "Your Number" was shot in Atlanta. The song's remix features rap vocals by Fetty Wap and was released on 16 July 2015. "Your Number" was re-released by RCA Records following Ayo Jay's record deal with the label. On 28 February 2017, the song was certified gold by the RIAA. On 23 August 2016, RCA Records released another remix, featuring Chris Brown and Kid Ink.

== Discography ==
=== Singles ===
List of singles as lead artist, with selected chart positions and certifications, showing year released and album name
Year	Title	Peak chart positions		Certifications	Album
Year	Title	US R&B/HH	US R&B	Certifications	Album
2013	"Don't Say That"	—	—		Non-album singles
2014	"Available"	—	—		Non-album singles
2015	"Your Number"	—	—		Non-album singles
2015	"Your Number (Remix)" (featuring Fetty Wap)	—	—		Non-album singles
2015	"Think About Me"	—	—		Non-album singles
2015	"Ibadi Yen"	—	—		Non-album singles
2016	"Fowosere"	—	—		Non-album singles
2016	"Your Number"	45	19	RIAA: Gold	Non-album singles
2016	"Your Number (Remix)"	—	11		Non-album singles
2017	"Correct G" (featuring Davido and Olamide)	—	—		Non-album singles
2017	"The Vibe"	—	—		Lazy Genius
2017	"Want You"	—	—		Lazy Genius
2020	"Peace of Mind"	—	—		Non-album single

== Awards and nominations ==
Year	Awards ceremony	Award description(s)	Results	Ref
2014	Nigeria Entertainment Awards	Most Promising Act to Watch	Won	
2015	Nigeria Entertainment Awards	Best New Act to Watch	Nominated	
2016	Nigeria Entertainment Awards	Diaspora Artist	Won	

== See also ==
- List of Nigerian musicians
