= Mr Oreo =

Single by Iyanya

from the album The Evolution and Applaudise
- Released: 4 June 2014
- Genre: Afropop
- Length: 3:44
- Label: Made Men
- Songwriter: Iyanya Onoyom Mbuk
- Producer: Selebobo

Iyanya singles chronology
"Jombolo" (2013)	"Mr Oreo" (2014)	"My Lane" (2014)

"Mr Oreo" (also titled "Mr Orio") is a song by Nigerian singer Iyanya. It was commercially released on 4 June 2014 as the second single from Made Men Music Group's compilation album The Evolution (2014). Produced by Selebobo, the song later appeared on Iyanya's third studio album, Applaudise (2015).

== Background and release ==
On 29 May 2014, Iyanya's record label, Made Men Music Group, released the compilation album The Evolution, which also included the track "Mr Orio", although later retitled "Mr Oreo". On 4 June 2014, the song was released commercially on iTunes as the album's second single (the first single, "Say Yeah", was released in April 2014). "Mr Oreo" also appeared on Iyanya's third studio album, Applaudise, which was released in September 2015.

== Music video ==
The music video for "Mr Oreo" was directed by Mega Boi and filmed in Brooklyn, New York City. While talking about the filming in an interview with OkayAfrica, Iyanya said; "I was on tour and found that everyone started spitting the words of the song left right and centre everywhere and we just thought yeah people like the song so let's just do a video but let's do something different because we are in the States, let's take it easy and simple". The first images from the video shoot were released online in August 2014, while a behind-the-scenes video was released on 15 September 2014. The music video premiered on 23 September 2014, via Iyanya's Vevo channel. An official lyrics video was uploaded to his Vevo channel on 20 February 2015.

== Accolades ==
Year	Awards ceremony	Award description(s)	Results
2015	4Syte TV Music Video Awards	Best African Act Video	Nominated
