= Tisan Bako =

Nigerian media personality

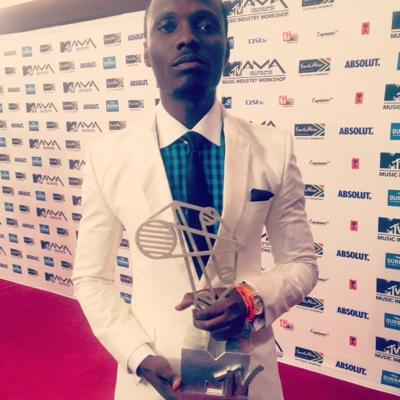
- Tisan on the red carpet of the MTV Africa Music Awards
- Born: Tisan Jeremiah Bako; 16 April
- Occupations: Software Engineer, On-air personality, Occasional Actor
- Organization(s): Raypower 100.5 FM, BNN Bloomberg, CTV News Channel
- Awards: Nigeria Entertainment Awards, Nigerian Broadcasters Merit Awards, The Future Awards Africa

Tisan Jeremiah Bako, popularly known as Tisan Bako, is a Nigerian tech and media personality. He is known for hosting the drive time show Powerplay on Raypower 100.5 FM, where he won multiple awards including The Future Awards Africa, Nigeria Entertainment Awards, Nigeria Media Merit award. He was also listed among Avance Media 100 Most influential Nigerians in 2018. He has also worked as a news producer for popular Canadian news stations including CTV News Channel and BNN Bloomberg. Tisan Currently works in the tech industry.

== Early life ==
Tisan Jeremiah Bako was born in Sokoto on 16 April. He had his primary education at Command Children School, Ribadun Cantonment Kaduna, Nigeria, and secondary education in Ojo High School Ojo, Lagos. He also has a degree in Mass communication.

== Career ==
Bako currently works at Bell Media as a news producer. Prior to that, he worked at Raypower 100.5 FM where he hosted the award winning drive time show PowerPlay on Raypower 100.5 FM.

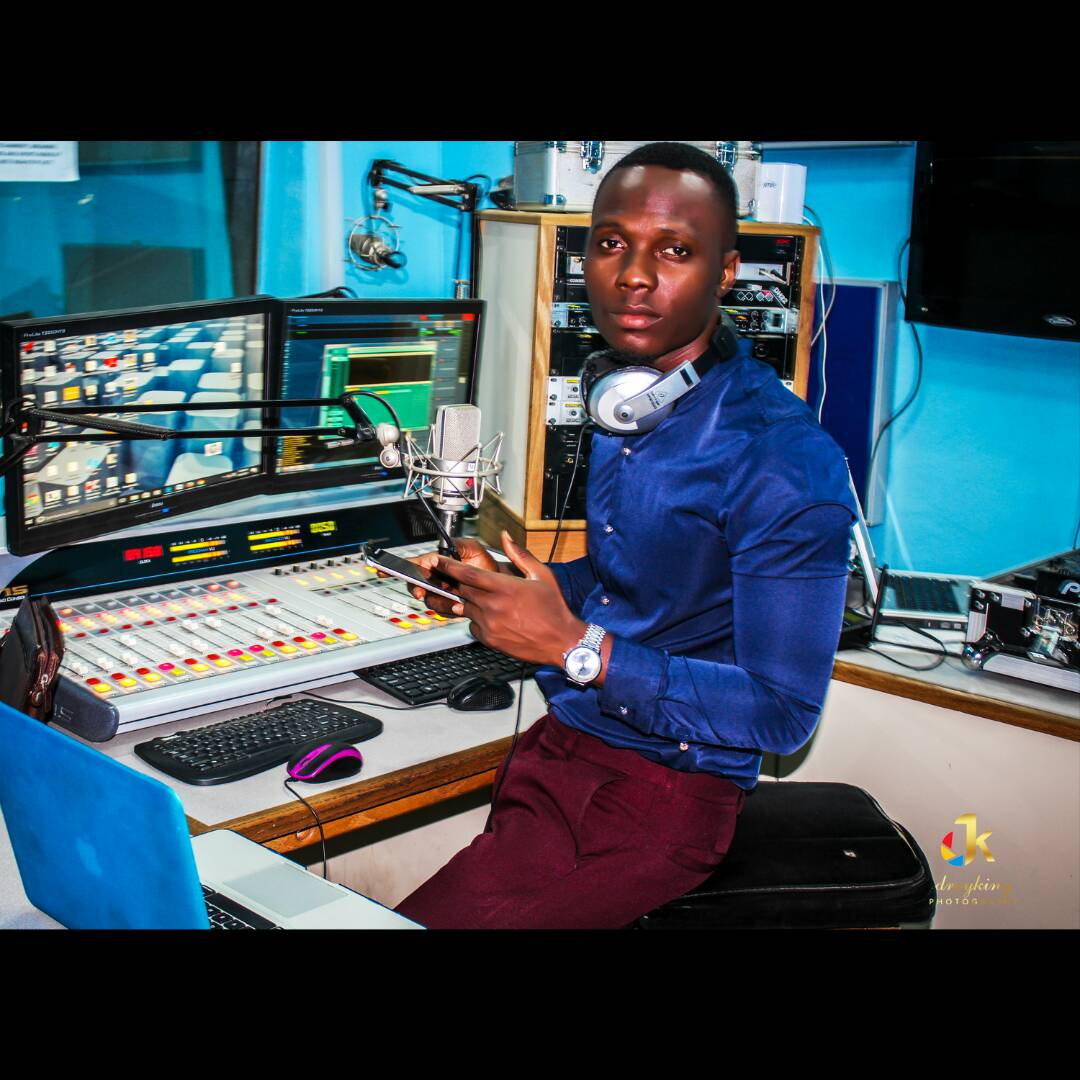
Tisan Bako

== Awards and nominations ==
Year	Award	Category	Result	Note
2014	Nigerian Broadcasters Merit Awards	Nigerian Broadcaster of the year (Male) (People's Choice)	Nominated	—N/a
2014	Nigerian Broadcasters Merit Awards	Outstanding Radio Program Presenter - Lagos(Drive Time 4pm-8pm)	Won	—N/a
2015	Nigeria Entertainment Awards	OAP Of the Year (Male)	Nominated	—N/a
2015	Nigerian Broadcasters Merit Awards	Nigerian Broadcaster of the year (Male) (People's Choice)	Nominated	—N/a
2016	Nigeria Entertainment Awards	OAP Of the Year (Male)	Won	—N/a
2017	The Future Awards Africa	THE FUTURE AWARDS AFRICA PRIZE FOR ON AIR PERSONALITY (AUDIO)	Won	—N/a
