= Tomorrow Ever After =

- Directed by: Ela Thier
- Written by: Ela Thier
- Produced by: Thier Productions
- Cinematography: Milton Kam
- Edited by: Ela Thier
- Music by: Rob Schwimmer
- Release dates: January 10, 2017 (Calcutta International Cult Film Festival); May 5, 2017
- Running time: 95 minutes
- Country: United States

Tomorrow Ever After is a 2017 science-fiction comedic drama film, written, directed by, and starring Ela Thier. The movie centers around Shaina, a first-time time traveler from 600 years in the future, who gets stranded in 2015 by mistake. According to the filmmaker, the film is the first in a trilogy.

== Plot ==
Shaina is a historian from 600 years in the future. She travels back in time with a group for the purposes of academic research - but an error occurs and she is separated from the group and deposited in 2015 in New York City, far from the time for which she was aiming and alone.

The only means she has of communicating her predicament to those who might help is her 'implement' - a small futuristic device, reminiscent of a smartphone. But this is only partially working.

She seeks to recruit help from various strangers but is repeatedly rebuffed. Human kindness and generosity are the norm where she's from and all her actions presuppose that this would be the case anywhere.

She continues to be rebuffed until she is mugged by Milton and, at the point of a gun, directed to an ATM. Here she discovers that her implement can decode the ATM and it dispenses money seemingly without limit. Milton attempts to run off but Shaina tackles him and asks him to help her. He thinks she's crazy but he grudgingly agrees to help her, thinking perhaps he can use her implement to withdraw even more money later.

Together, with Milton, his friend and his girlfriend, Shaina engages in a series of misadventures in an attempt to power up her implement and return home.

As a historian, Shaina learned about this period of time as 'The Great Despair', a horrible period in human history filled with pain, exploitation, greed, pollution and loneliness. Throughout the story, she continues acting with the expectation that people will be good, caring and helpful. In part, she is crushingly disappointed and it keeps causing problems. In part, her expectation and earnest and obvious will to do good causes the people around her to become more caring.

== Cast ==
- Ela Thier as Shaina
- Nabil Viñas as Milton
- Ebbe Bassey as Imani
- Memo as Antonio
- Matthew Murumba as Rudy
- Daphna Thier as Ava Shaw

== Reception ==
On review aggregator Rotten Tomatoes the film has a score of 86%.

E. Nina Rothe wrote in The Huffington Post that the movie "Played with touching insight and natural beauty ...provided me with a newfound hopefulness and a new sense of wonder for my fellow humans."

== See also ==
- Foreign Letters
