= Akothee =

Kenyan musician and business woman

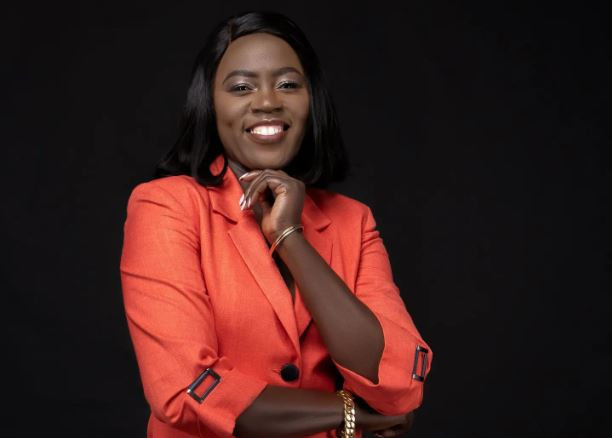

Background information
- Born: Esther Akoth; 8 April 1983 (age 43); Kisumu County, Kenya
- Education: Mount Kenya University
- Genre: Benga Afrobeats Contemporary pop
- Occupation: Singer dancer entrepreneur
- Instrument: Vocals
- Years active: 2008–present
- Website: akothee.com

Esther Akoth (born 8 April 1983), better known as Akothee, is a Kenyan musician, entrepreneur, and philanthropist. She is the founder of Akothee Safaris, a tour company based in Kenya; the Akothee Foundation, a charitable organization focused on education and poverty alleviation; Aknotela, a luxury fashion brand; and Akothee Homes, a real estate business.

Akothee's music blends contemporary East African styles with Afrobeats, and she has collaborated with artists such as Diamond Platnumz, Flavour (musician), and MC Galaxy. Her music videos and live performances are known for energetic choreography and bold stage presence, often described as audacious and charismatic.

== Early life and education ==
Akothee was born on 8 April 1983 in Kisumu County, Kenya and raised by an administrator father and a politician mother in Migori County. At 14, she dropped out of school and eloped with her first husband. She was a mother to 4 children by the time she turned 20.

In 2004, the year she turned 21, Akothee eventually completed her secondary education, and returned to school 14 years later, with the insistence of her mother to complete her bachelor's degree. In 2023, she earned Bachelor's degree in Business Management, specializing in Human resource management from Mount Kenya University.

== Music career ==
Akothee began her music career in 2008, initially performing in local venues before gaining national attention. Her music blends Afrobeats, Benga, and contemporary pop styles, often featuring themes of empowerment, love, and resilience. She has collaborated with several prominent African artists, including Diamond Platnumz, Flavour, and MC Galaxy.

In March 2020, she released "Mwitu Asa", a song written and performed in the Kamba language, which was praised for its cultural authenticity and linguistic diversity.

Akothee has performed at major concerts across East Africa and Europe, and her music videos often feature elaborate choreography and high production value. She is known for her bold stage presence and outspoken personality, which have contributed to her popularity on social media and in mainstream media.

== Entrepreneurship ==
Akothee is the founder of several business ventures, including Akothee Safaris, a tour and travel company based in Nairobi.

She also launched Akothee Homes, a real estate venture, and Aknotela, a luxury fashion brand. Her investments include a palatial residence in Rongo, Migori County, which she describes as a symbol of financial independence and long-term wealth creation.

In addition to her commercial ventures, Akothee is the founder of the Akothee Foundation, a charitable organization focused on education, health, and poverty alleviation. The foundation was relaunched after a brief closure due to administrative challenges, which she attributed to mismanagement and exploitation by associates.

In 2023, Akothee was appointed Brand Ambassador for Homa Bay County by Governor Gladys Wanga. In this role, she promotes tourism, cultural heritage, and youth empowerment initiatives under the #ExperienceHomaBay campaign.

== Personal life ==
Akoth is a mother of five children from three different relationships. After overcoming early challenges as a teen mother who had 4 children by the time she was 20, she built a successful career in music and entrepreneurship. She owns homes in Mombasa, Migori County, and Zürich, and is known for her philanthropic work through the Akothee Foundation. She married Denis Schweizer in April 2023 and the couple reportedly separated the same year.

In 2023, she announced plans to launch the Akothee Foundation Academy to provide free education to underprivileged children. She has also supported individual students, including Milly Nafula, a medical student who received financial aid from Akothee.

Akothee has publicly shared her health challenges, including chronic migraines, fibroids, and a blood clot, which led her to prioritize mental wellness and self-care.

== Awards and recognitions ==
Akothee has received multiple accolades for her contributions to music and entertainment. She won:

- "Best Female Artist (East Africa)" at the African Muzik Magazine Awards (AFRIMMA) in 2016 and 2019
- "Best Video" at AFRIMMA in 2016
- "Best Female Artist" at the African Entertainment Awards USA

She was also appointed Brand ambassador for Homa Bay County in 2023 by Governor Gladys Wanga, where she leads tourism and cultural initiatives under the #ExperienceHomaBay campaign.

Akothee has a strong social media presence and currently has over 3.6 million followers on Instagram, making her one of the most followed celebrities in East Africa.

== Discography ==
=== Selected singles ===
- "Sweet Love" (feat. Diamond Platnumz)
- "Give It To Me" (feat. Flavour)
- "Oyoyo" (feat. MC Galaxy)
- "Yuko Moyoni"
- "Benefactor"
- "New Dance" (feat. Oc)
- "Osilliation"
- "Nimechoka"
- "Pashe"
- "Katika"
- "Djele Djele"
- "Shengerera"
- "Mama Bougerie"
- "Tucheze"
- "Mwitu Asa"

== See also ==
- Diamond Platnumz – Tanzanian musician featured in "Sweet Love"
- Flavour (musician) – Nigerian artist featured in "Give It To Me"
- MC Galaxy – Nigerian singer featured in "Oyoyo"
