= Quality (CDQ album) =

Studio album by CDQ
- Released: August 22, 2016
- Recorded: 2014–16
- Genre: Hip hop; afro pop; rap; trap
- Label: General
- Producer: Sunday Ginikachukwu Nweke; Sodiq Abubakar Yusuf (both exec.); Masterkraft

Singles from Quality
- 1. "Gbemisaya" Released: September 17, 2014; 2. "Indomie (Remix)" Released: January 23, 2015; 3. "Salaro" Released: May 6, 2015; 4. "Talosobe" Released: August 19, 2015; 5. "Oobi" Released: August 27, 2015; 6. "Nowo E Soke" Released: December 1, 2015

Quality is the debut studio album of Nigerian rapper and songwriter CDQ. It was released on 22 August 2016 through General Records. The album's release was preceded by six singles including "Nowo E Soke" which won Best Afro Hip-Hop Video at the 2016 Nigeria Music Video Awards; "Indomie (Remix)" and "Gbemisaya" which were added as bonus songs.

== Critical reception ==
Professional ratings
Review scores
| Source | Rating |
|---|---|
| Filter Free | 64/100 |
| Pulse Nigeria | 3.5/5 stars |
| notJustOk | 3.5/5 stars |

Quality received mixed reviews from mainstream music critics. Pulse Nigeria and notJustOk assigned the album 3.5 star ratings, however 360Nobs and tooXclusive were not impressed with the lyrical content and musical production of the album. Impressed with the use of dance as an element in the album, Joey Akan of Pulse Nigeria wrote, "CDQ’s debut effort is a reflection of his talents; direct, loud, street-influenced, and aimed for instant entertainment and dancing. It’s a win for the rapper". Wilfred Okiche, a writer for 360Nobs noted that the album is "likely to suffer because it is too lukewarm", and further pointed out that "it is merely a passable effort from an artiste who isn’t exactly getting fans worked up for a complete body of work". While Don Boye of notJustOk described the album as a "quality debut offering", tooXclusive's Daniel Enisan described the album as an "average album" while observing that "the album was boring, not because there was not much excitement but because the absence of versatility killed the vibes".

== Track listing ==
| No. | Title | Writer(s) | Producer(s) | Length |
|---|---|---|---|---|
| 1. | "Shanawole" (featuring Ice Prince) | Sodiq Yusuf; Panshak Zamani | Masterkraft | 3:54 |
| 2. | "Salaro" | Yusuf | Masterkraft | 3:36 |
| 3. | "Ferrari" | Yusuf | Masterkraft | 3:26 |
| 4. | "Nowo E Soke" (featuring Wizkid) | Yusuf; Ayo Balogun | Masterkraft | 4:07 |
| 5. | "Skit" (featuring VJ Adams) | Yusuf; Adams Adebola | Masterkraft | 0:44 |
| 6. | "4AM" | Yusuf | Masterkraft | 3:03 |
| 7. | "Oobi" (featuring Cayana) | Yusuf; Cayana | Masterkraft | 3:29 |
| 8. | "Talosobe" | Yusuf | Masterkraft | 4:21 |
| 9. | "FCFS" | Yusuf | Masterkraft | 3:30 |
| 10. | "Odikwa OK" (featuring Banky W) | Yusuf; Bankole Wellington | Masterkraft | 3:38 |
| 11. | "Sun Seyin" | Yusuf | Masterkraft | 3:46 |
| 12. | "Olowo Skit" (featuring Kenny Black) | Yusuf; Otolorin Peter | Masterkraft | 1:04 |
| 13. | "Olowo" (featuring Reminisce) | Yusuf; Remilekun Safaru | MAsterkraft | 4:02 |
| 14. | "Otishe" (featuring Gabana Bwoy) | Yusuf; Gabana Bwoy | Masterkraft | 3:33 |
| 15. | "Abo" (featuring Vector & Masterkraft) | Yusuf; Olanrewaju Ogunmefun; Sunday Nweke | Masterkraft | 3:52 |

Bonus
| No. | Title | Writer(s) | Producer(s) | Length |
|---|---|---|---|---|
| 16. | "Indomie (Remix)" (featuring Olamide & Davido) | Yusuf; Olamide Adedeji; David Adeleke | Masterkraft | 4:21 |
| 17. | "Gbemisaya" (featuring Skales) | Yusuf; Raoul Njeng-Njeng | Masterkraft | 4:21 |
| Total length: | | | | 58:25 |

== Personnel ==
Artists

- CDQ – primary artist (all tracks)
- Ice Prince – featured artist (track 1)
- Wizkid – featured artist (track 4)
- VJ Adams – vocals (track 5)
- Cayana – featured artist (track 7)
- Banky W – featured artist (track 10)
- Kenny Black – vocals (track 12)
- Reminisce – featured artist (track 13)
- Gabana Bwoy – featured artist (track 14)
- Vector – featured artist (track 15)
- Masterkraft – featured artist (track 15)
- Olamide – featured artist (track 16)
- Davido – featured artist (track 16)
- Skales – featured artist (track 17)

Production

- Masterkraft – producer
- Angelic Touch – costume
- PhotoNimi – photography
- Mag Designs – design
- LordGabrielz – mastering, mixing (tracks 1, 6, 7, 8, 10, 11, 13, 14)
- Sheyman – mastering, mixing (tracks 2, 3)
- Suka – mastering, mixing (tracks 4, 17)
- Beenie Macauley – mastering, mixing (track 9)
- Mix Monster – mastering, mixing (tracks 15)
- Foster Zion – mastering, mixing (tracks 16)

== Release history ==
List of release dates, showing region, formats, label, editions and reference
| Region | Date | Format(s) | Label | Edition(s) |
|---|---|---|---|---|
| Worldwide | August 22, 2016 | CD; digital download | General Records | Standard edition |
