= Duncan Daniels =

American singer, songwriter

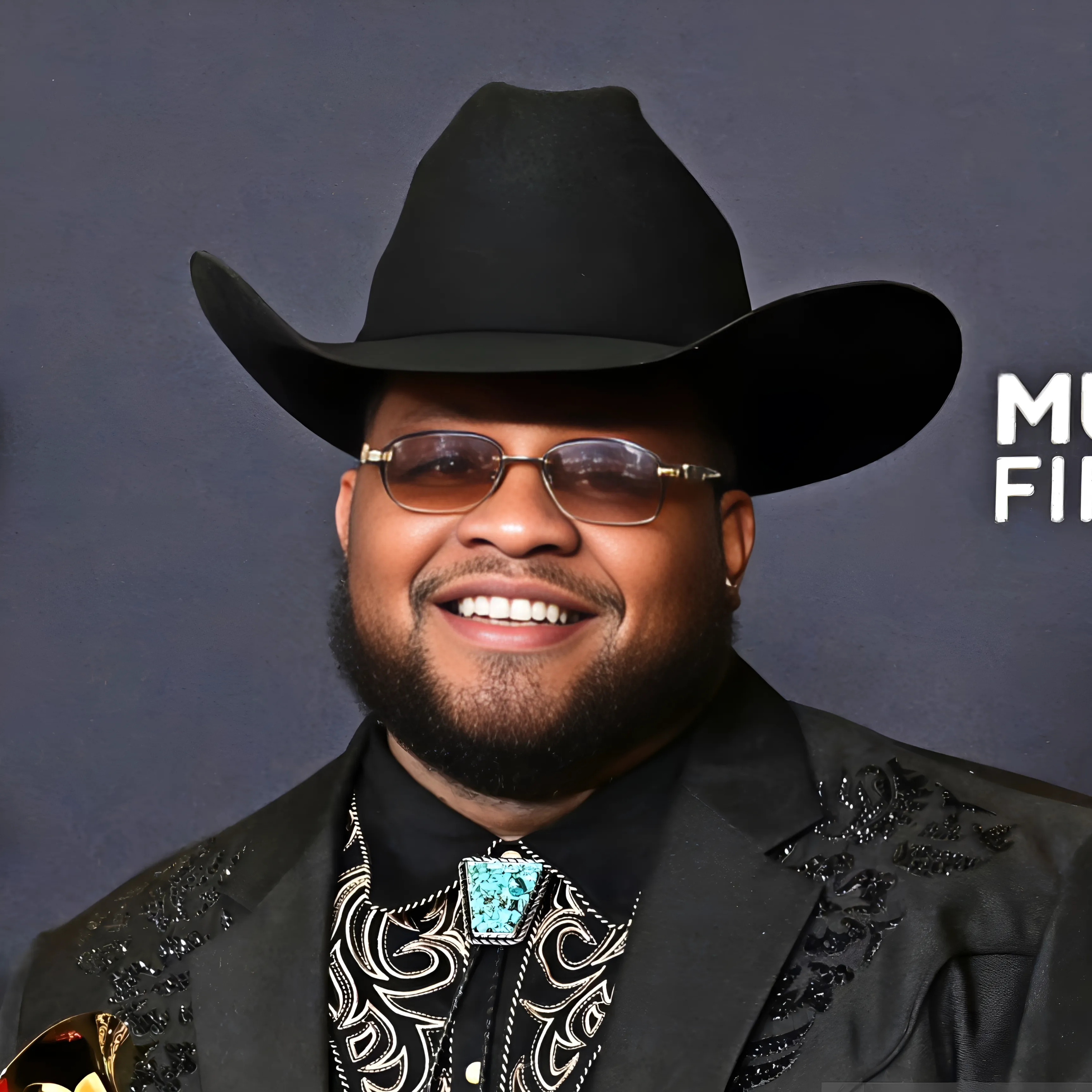
- Daniels in 2025

Background information
- Born: August 16, 1983 (age 43); Boston, Massachusetts, United States
- Genres: Country, Americana, Alt-country, Afrobeats
- Occupations: Singer, songwriter, record producer
- Instruments: Vocals, piano, drums, guitar
- Years active: 2003–present
- Label: Dunkishrock Production
- Website: www.duncandanielsmusic.com

Duncan Daniels (born August 16, 1983) is an American singer, songwriter and record producer whose career spans over two decades. Born in Boston to Nigerian parents and raised between England and Port Harcourt, Nigeria, he worked primarily in Afrobeats and Afropop for the first two decades of his career before moving into country music and Americana in the mid-2020s. He records for his own label, Dunkishrock Production, and has been a voting member of the Recording Academy since 2023.

== Early life and education ==
Duncan Onyemuwa was born in Boston, Massachusetts, United States to Nigerian parents. In his early life, he lived in between England and Nigeria, Port Harcourt precisely. He had his first degree in Music Production from Berklee College of Music.

== Career ==
=== Early career (2003–2023) ===
Daniels started playing music at the age of 11 and started working on music production at age 15. In 2006, he released his debut 12-track album " I Don Taya", and in 2010 released his second studio album titled "Sho Stoppah".

He was nominated for "Best US Based Male Artist Of The Year" at the 2011 Nigeria Entertainment Awards, and "Best Diaspora Artist of the Year" at the 2016 Nigeria Entertainment Awards.

=== Transition to country and Americana (2024–present) ===
In 2024 Daniels released Dan Cain: Honesty & Nostalgia, an album recorded under the alter ego "Dan Cain" that marked a shift away from the Afrobeats material of his earlier catalogue toward country, Americana and alternative rock. The record was assembled independently with contributions from musicians in multiple countries, including the Czech National Symphony Orchestra, which appears on the track "Holy Water".

An expanded edition, Honesty & Nostalgia (Deluxe), followed on August 15, 2025. The twenty-track release was issued on Dunkishrock Production and catalogued as country and Americana. It collects the original album alongside newly recorded material, including the single "Cowboys Wear Stetsons", and closes with "Nevaeh's Show", a short spoken interlude credited to Daniels' daughter.

Daniels has described his approach to the genre in terms of belonging rather than geography, summarising his position as "Country ain't a place, it's who you are inside."

==== "Cowboys Wear Stetsons" ====
"Cowboys Wear Stetsons" was released in 2025 as the lead country single from Honesty & Nostalgia (Deluxe). It was recorded at Pentavarit Studios in Nashville and produced by Justine Blazer, with Ron Pope serving as co-producer. The song was written by Pope, Daniels, Zach Berkman and Darbi Shaun Lacagnina.

The session personnel were drawn from Nashville's studio community: Smith Curry on pedal steel guitar, Devin Malone on acoustic guitar, Justin Ostrander on electric guitar, Mike Rinne on bass, Evan Hutchings on drums and Billy Justineau on keyboards. The track was mixed and mastered in both stereo and Dolby Atmos, with the Atmos master completed by Brad Blackwood.

Lyrically the song uses the imagery of cowboy dress as a frame for questions of identity and inclusion within country music. Reviewing the single for Broken Color, a critic wrote that it "honours country music's roots without shrinking from questions about who gets to claim that heritage."

Response from country trade press was mixed. Writing in MusicRow's DISClaimer singles column on August 14, 2025, Robert K. Oermann noted that Daniels was "aiming for a traditional sound" on the record while criticising the vocal performance. Spin described his 2025 material as a blend of blues-inflected rock and modern country, drawing comparisons to Marcus King and the Jeff Healey Band.

== Discography ==
=== Songs ===
- Cowboys Wear Stetsons (2025)
- End Signs (2025)
- Kryptonite (2025)
- Rodeo (2025)
- Nirvana's Song (2025)
- Lost Without You (2024)
- Hodor (2024)
- One Perfect Day (2024)
- Evergreen (2024)
- Leave It All (2024)
- Candle (2024)
- Holy Water (2024)
- Peacock Feather (2024)
- Into the Sunset (2024)
- Take my hand (2024)
- Live Before I Die (2024)
- The Time Traveler (2023)
- Purpleville (2023)
- Carolyn (2023)
- Blood Pressure (2023)
- Show me love (2023)
- Back Outside (2023)
- Strong Ting (2023)
- Patronize (2023)
- Yard Party (2022)
- Solo (2022)
- Obalende (2022)
- Mmadu (2022)
- Diaspora Night (2022)
- Waste Time (2022)
- Catching Feelings (2022)
- Iwo nikan (2022)
- The Rhythm (2022)
- Tears on my eyes (2022)
- Climbing Higher (2022)
- I don Taya ft Rah the Answer (2005)
- I don Taya Remix ft Drastik, Mackgee, Xuzia (2006)
- Shostoppah (2009)
- Like This ft M.I (2009)
- Ready for Love (2010)
- U & I (2010)
- Blindly in Love (2012)
- Way to Your Heart (2014)
- In Spite of These (2014)
- Unconditional Love (2015)
- Shine ft Tia Yasmine
- Good Time ft Rotimi (2015)
- Will Tomorrow Ever Come (2016)
- Body in Motion (2016)
- Six Past Six ft Aduke (2016)
- Eye Service (2016)
- Oluwa Design (2018)
- Enado (2019)
- Trouble ft Lyn (2019)
- Gbedu-ft Mackgee, Lady Albatross, Jamila (2020)
- Holiday ft Avid the Lyrical (2020)
- Bad Mind ft Layydoe (2021)
- Fix That ft Lady Albatross, Korkormikor (2021)
- Taste of Heaven (2021)
- Fight for your Love ft Abobi Eddieroll, Lady Albatross (2021)
- Quality ft Big Klef, Olu (2021)
- Addicted to Love (2021)
- The Process Freestyle (2021)

== Albums ==
- Honesty & Nostalgia (Deluxe) (2025)
- Dan Cain: Honesty & Nostalgia (2024)
- The Time Traveler Ep (2023)
- Songs of limitless optimism - S.O.L.O (2022)
- Afro-eclectic (2020)
- More Than a Decade of Music (2016)
- Art of Me (2014)
- Sho Stoppah (2010)
- I Don Taya (2006)

== Dan Cain album reception and performance ==
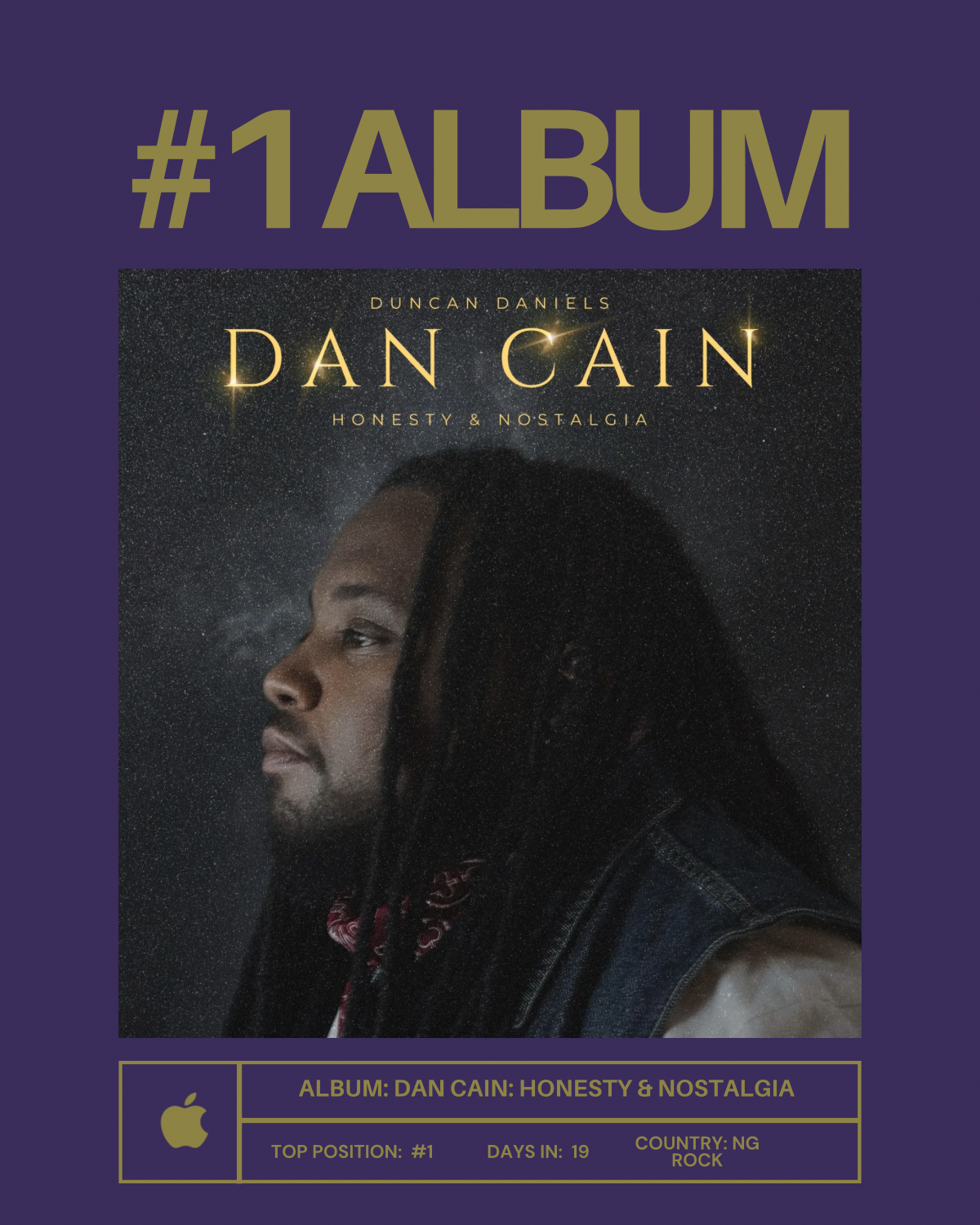
Fourth day in a row at number one on Apple Music Nigeria Rock Album Charts

Duncan Daniels’ album Dan Cain: Honesty & Nostalgia currently holds the record as the longest run at number one by a Nigerian Rock Artist in the 10 Rock Albums on Apple Music Nigeria, holding the position for over one week straight.

Critics have praised it for its heartfelt songwriting and unique production approach, featuring nearly 50 musicians from 15 countries. The album has earned positive reviews from major music sites like Notion, The Fader, and Music News.

== Personal life ==
Daniels relocated from New York City and now resides in The Midwest, with his wife and daughters. Several songs in his catalogue are written for or about his children, including "Nirvana's Song" and "Taste of Heaven".

== Awards and nominations ==
Year	Award ceremony	Award description	Result	Ref
2011	Nigeria Entertainment Awards	Best US Based Male Artist	Nominated	
2014	Nigeria Entertainment Awards	Music Producer of the Year	Nominated	
2016	Nigeria Entertainment Awards	Best Diaspora Artist of the Year	Nominated	
