= MC Galaxy =

Nigerian singer and Performer

- Born: Innocent Udeme Udofot; Uyo, Akwa Ibom, Nigeria
- Genres: Afro pop
- Occupation: Singer-songwriter
- Instrument: Vocals
- Years active: 2013–present
- Label: MCG Entertainment

Innocent Udeme Udofot (born 2 May), better known as MC Galaxy, is a Nigerian singer, songwriter and performer. He rose to fame after winning the Davido dance competition in 2012. He has collaborated with artists such as Tspize, Swizz Beatz, Uhuru, Shizzi, and Akothee.

== Career ==
MC Galaxy began his career as a dancer and comedian in Akwa Ibom State.

On 21 November 2012, he won ₦500,000 in a dance competition at Nigerian singer Davido's 20th birthday party and later appeared in Iyanya's "Kukere" music video.

He moved to Lagos to pursue entertainment and initially performed at clubs and events while developing his skills in comedy and music. He adopted the name MC Galaxy after a suggestion from a woman in Akwa Ibom.

On 4 October 2013, he released his debut single "Nek-Unek" featuring Davido, produced by Shizzi. The music video was funded with ₦2 million provided by an associate of then-Akwa Ibom governor Godswill Akpabio.

Galaxy gained national attention with his TSpize-produced single "Sekem", which popularized a viral dance of the same name. The song was released on 20 March 2014 and means "to move or shift."

== Personal life ==
In 2017, MC Galaxy revealed that he lost ₦25 million to the MMM Ponzi scheme, a fraudulent investment platform that collapsed in Nigeria. He described the experience as a major financial setback and warned others to be cautious with high-risk investment schemes.

== Discography ==
=== Albums ===
- Breakthrough (2015)
- MMM (2017)

=== Selected singles ===
- "Nek-Unek" (feat. Davido)
- "Sekem"
- "Oyoyo" (feat. Akothee)
- "Komolop Cholop"
- "Iyaya Eh"

== Awards and nominations ==
Year	Awards ceremony	Award description(s)	Results
2014	Nigeria Entertainment Awards	Indigenous Artist of the Year	Nominated
2015	Nigeria Entertainment Awards	Best Dance/Live Performance	Won
2015	Nigeria Entertainment Awards	Indigenous Artist of the Year	Nominated
2016	Nigeria Entertainment Awards	Collaboration of the Year	Nominated

== See also ==
- List of Nigerian musicians
- Akothee
- Davido
