= Timi Frank =

Nigerian politician

Timi Frank is a Nigerian politician and a former Deputy National Publicity Secretary of the ruling All Progressives Congress (APC). He was suspended from the party in 2016 after criticizing the national chairman of the party and his opposition to the party's nominated candidates in the 2015 National Assembly leadership election which led to the party losing to the renegade members. Frank currently serves as United Liberation Movement for West Papua (ULMWP) – an Indonesian Colony ambassador to East Africa and the Middle East.

== Political career ==
Frank from Bayelsa State was a member of the ruling Peoples Democratic Party (PDP) before a crisis erupted in the party following the disputed PDP Governors’ Forum chairmanship election, which led to five governors elected on the party ticket breaking away and forming a factional party known as the new PDP (nPDP) led by Kawu Baraje in 2013. Frank was appointed the spokesperson of the nPDP and served until the party formed a mega merger with ACN, ANPP, CPC, and a faction of APGA to form All Progressives Congress (APC). Frank was elected deputy national publicity secretary working alongside Lai Mohammed the national publicity secretary of the APC. After the party won the 2015 presidential election and secured majority in both chambers of the National Assembly, the party nominated Ahmed Lawan for President of the Senate and Femi Gbajabiamila as Speaker of the House of Representatives, Frank and other members of the party opposed the party's nominated candidates and worked for the election of Bukola Saraki and Yakubu Dogara fellow members of the nPDP bloc in the APC for Senate president and speaker of the House.

Frank is a known ally and an outspoken member of the political camp of vice president Atiku Abubakar. In 2019, Frank openly advised presidential election tribunal judges to be fair in their ruling devoid of well-known biased rulings against opposition party candidates based on judicial ‘technicalities’ in a petition filed by Atiku Abubakr against the election of president Muhammadu Buhari. Buhari Media Organisation (BMO) responded swiftly calling for the arrest of Frank for attempting to “arm twist members of the tribunal”. In 2023 and 2024, Frank publicly tackled vice president Kashim Shettima and Bode George over their comments that Atiku Abubakar should not contemplate being on the ballot in the 2027 presidential election. Kashim Shettima had comment that he would “retire Atiku” from politics and “teach him how to rear goats and boilers” while Bode George advised Atiku Abubakar to wait until 2031 when power shall return to the north. Frank responded to the two men that no man has the power to retire the presidential candidate of the People’s Democratic Party (PDP) from politics except God.

In April 2018, Blueprint in an article quoting an “impeccable source” reported that Timi had been endorsed by the APC Youth wing and was consulting South – South leaders of the APC for a possible run for the chairmanship position of the party from the nPDP bloc in the party's 2018 national convention despite being suspended from the party in controversial circumstances. His ambition was thwarted after the party endorsed a consensus candidate. On 2 August 2021, the interim president of the Provisional Government of United Liberation Movement for West Papua (ULMWP) – a Colony of Indonesia appointed Frank as an ambassador to East Africa and the Middle East to advance the campaign for the liberation and independence of the colony.
