= Your Number (Ayo Jay song) =

2013 song by Ayo Jay

Single by Ayo Jay
- Released: 21 June 2013 (original); 24 June 2016 (re-release)
- Genre: Afropop; dancehall
- Length: 3:24
- Label: One Nation (original); RCA (re-release)
- Songwriters: Ayoola Ogundeyi Jr.; Melvin Alli-Owe
- Producer: Melvitto

Ayo Jay singles chronology
"Omo Yen" (2013)	"Your Number" (2013)	"Available" (2013)

Music video
- "Your Number" on YouTube

"Your Number" is a song by English-born Nigerian singer Ayo Jay. Produced by British record producer Melvitto, it was first released on 21 June 2013 by One Nation Records and re-released on 24 June 2016 by RCA Records. In February 2017, the song was certified gold in the United States by the RIAA. According to Raro Lae, "Your Number" is the first ever Nigerian song to sit on any Billboard chart without any features. Jon Caramanica of The New York Times ranked "Your Number" #6 on the publication's list of the Best Songs of 2016.

== Background ==
"Your Number" was recorded while Ayo Jay was attending Baruch College in New York, where he studied economics and finance. The song was recorded in East New York, Brooklyn, in Melvitto's room after he played Ayo Jay unused beats he brought back from Nigeria. Ayo Jay freestyled the hook "Can I get your number?" and completed the song over two days. After graduating in 2013, he signed to One Nation Records and released the song, whose early success surprised him.

Although the song aligned with contemporary Afropop trends, it initially gained stronger traction internationally than in Nigeria, with online engagement coming from the United Kingdom, United States, and the Middle East. He stated that the song was difficult to promote in Nigeria because it differed from the dominant local sound at the time. The remix was originally intended to feature Burna Boy, but the collaboration did not materialize. Ayo Jay signed with RCA Records on 24 June 2016 and the label re-released "Your Number" as his debut single under the label.

== Music videos ==
Two music videos were released for "Your Number". The first video was shot in Atlanta and released on 7 October 2013. Atlanta-based dance group Twerk Team appear in the video. In the video, Ayo Jay arrives at a house party and interacts with friends before noticing a woman who attracts his attention. He approaches her, dances with her, and attempts to get to know her. Throughout the video, scenes of Jay performing the song are intercut with choreography by Twerk Team. The video ends with him successfully obtaining her phone number. In December 2013, the Nigerian Broadcasting Commission (NBC) banned the video. After the ban and his signing with RCA Records, Ayo Jay decided to shoot a second video.

The second music video for "Your Number" was released on 30 August 2016. Directed by Ben Griffin, the video was shot in Los Angeles and centers on a social media dance challenge inspired by the song's viral popularity. In the visual, Ayo Jay invites fans to submit dance clips for a chance to attend a block party. The video intercuts staged dance performances with scenes of Jay performing, and concludes with a summer block party where he appears alongside selected dancers.

== Remixes ==
On 16 July 2015, One Nation Records released a remix to "Your Number" featuring American rapper and singer Fetty Wap. Prior to its release, Ayo Jay had announced via Instagram in June 2015 that he was working with Fetty Wap on the remix to his 2013 single. RCA Records released another remix, featuring Chris Brown and Kid Ink, on 23 August 2016.

== Accolades ==
Year	Awards ceremony	Award description(s)	Results
2016	Nigeria Entertainment Awards	Best Collaboration (Fetty Wap remix)	Nominated

== Charts ==
Chart (2016)	Peak position
US Hot R&B/Hip-Hop (Billboard)	45
R&B/Hip-Hop Airplay (Billboard)	40
UK Independent Singles Breakers Chart (OCC)	10

== Certifications ==
Certifications for "Your Number"
Region	Certification	Certified units/sales
New Zealand (RMNZ)	Gold	15,000^{‡}
United Kingdom (BPI)	Gold	400,000^{‡}
United States (RIAA)	Gold	500,000^{‡}
^{‡} Sales+streaming figures based on certification alone.

== Release history ==
Country	Date	Version	Format	Label
Nigeria	21 June 2013	Original	Digital download	One Nation
Worldwide	16 July 2015	Fetty Wap remix	Digital download	One Nation
Worldwide	24 June 2016	Re-release	Digital download	RCA
Worldwide	23 August 2016	Chris Brown and Kid Ink remix	Digital download	RCA
