= The Evolution (Made Men Music Group album) =

Compilation album by Made Men Music Group
- Released: 29 May 2014
- Recorded: 2013–2014
- Genre: Afropop
- Label: Made Men Music Group
- Producer: Ubi Franklin (exec.); Iyanya Onoyom Mbuk (exec.); Selebobo; Tekno; DJ Coublon

Singles from The Evolution
- 1. "Angelina" Released: 6 March 2014; 2. "Say Yeah" Released: 10 April 2014; 3. "Mr Oreo" Released: 4 June 2014; 4. "Alleluyah" Released: 11 February 2015

The Evolution is a compilation album by Made Men Music Group, released on 29 May 2014. The album's production was primarily handled by Selebobo, along with additional production from Tekno and DJ Coublon. The Evolution was mixed and mastered entirely by Selebobo; its title is a reference to the evolution of the Nigerian music industry.

== Track listing ==
No.	Title	Producer(s)	Length
1.	"Say Yeah" (featuring Iyanya, Emma Nyra, Tekno, Selebobo, and Baci)	Selebobo	5:09
2.	"Poco A Poco" (featuring Iyanya and Selebobo)	Selebobo	3:18
3.	"Amigo" (featuring Emma Nyra)	Selebobo	3:44
4.	"Mr Orio" (featuring Iyanya)	Selebobo	3:44
5.	"Alleluyah" (featuring Tekno)	Tekno	3:34
6.	"Angelina" (featuring Baci and Iyanya)	Selebobo	2:52
7.	"Asampete" (featuring Selebobo)	Selebobo	3:44
8.	"Dreaming" (featuring Iyanya and Emma Nyra)	DJ Coublon	3:18
9.	"Selfie" (featuring Selebobo)	Selebobo	3:19
10.	"Show Case" (featuring Tekno)	Tekno	2:56
11.	"Afrodisiac" (featuring Baci and Emma Nyra)	Selebobo	3:41
12.	"Follow You" (featuring Baci)	Selebobo	3:14
13.	"Zamina" (featuring Selebobo and Emma Nyra)	Selebobo	3:51
14.	"Osho" (featuring Iyanya and Tekno)	Tekno	3:40

== Personnel ==
- Ubi Franklin – executive producer
- Iyanya Onoyom Mbuk – executive producer, primary artist
- Emma Nyra – primary artist
- Selebobo – primary artist, record
- Tekno – primary artist, record producer
- DJ Coublon - Record Producer
- Baci – primary artist
- Abinibi – album art
- Paul Ukonu – photography

== Release history ==
Country/Digital platform	Date	Version	Format	Label
Nigeria; iTunes	29 May 2014	Standard	CD; digital download	Made Men Music Group
