= SHiiKANE =

British-Nigerian girl group

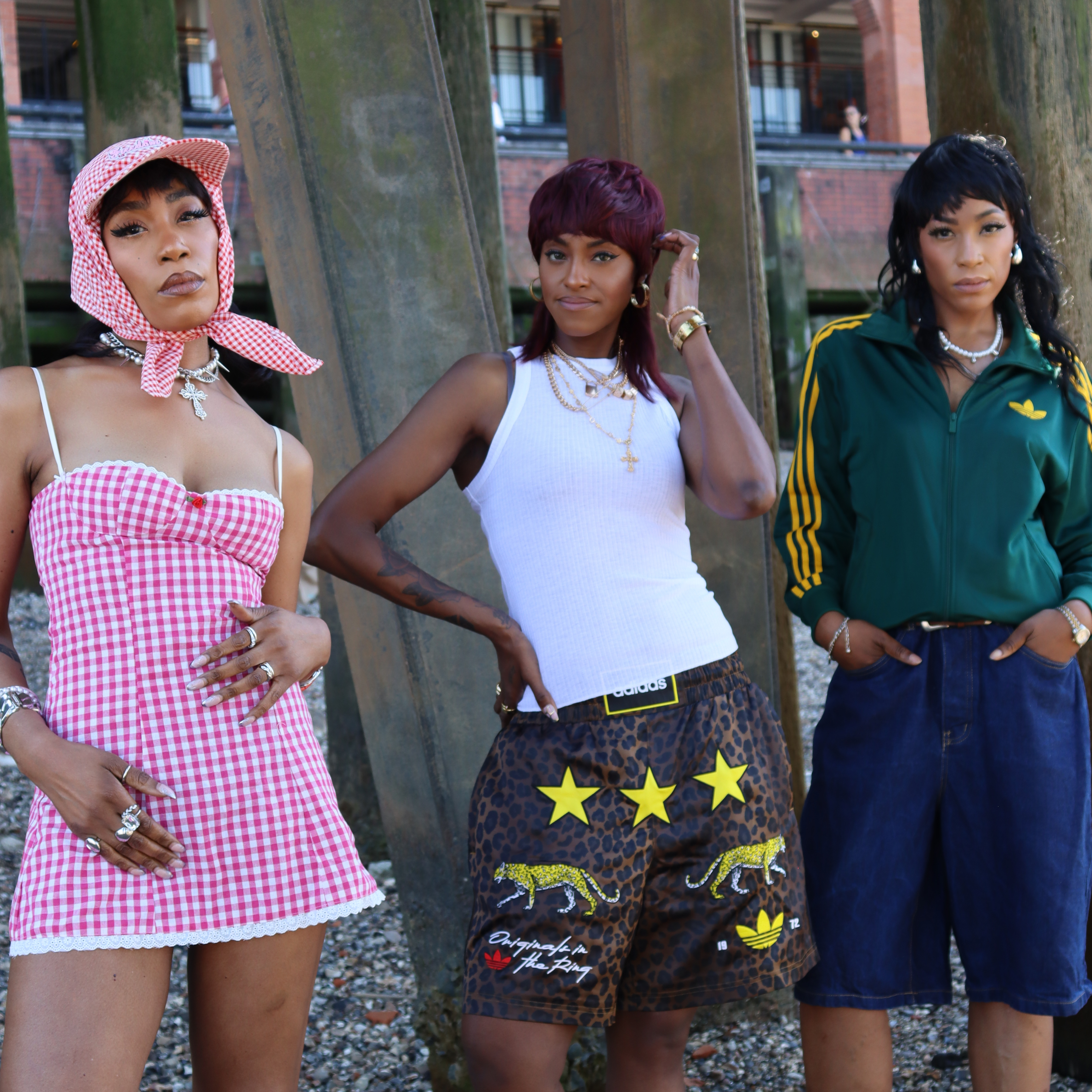
- Nigerian-British Girlgroup SHiiKANE

Background information
- Origin: Asaba, Delta State, Nigeria
- Genres: Afro-indie, Afrobeat
- Years active: 2012–present
- Label: M.A. Records
- Members: Shay, Annamay, Kay
- Website: www.shiikane.com

SHiiKANE (/ʃɪˈkeɪn/) is a Nigerian-British pop group made of three sisters, twins HRH and Princess Uche, and younger sister NK.

== Biography ==
SHiiKANE originally from Asaba, Delta State, Nigeria was formed while the girls were still attending schools in London. The group name derives from an amalgamation of their English names. SHiiKANE teamed up with producer P2J in 2014 and released a track titled “SugaKANE” which was made “Song of the week” by Toolz of BeatFM 99.9 Lagos Nigeria. Their music is influenced by different musical genres including R&B, rock, hip hop, soul and gospel.

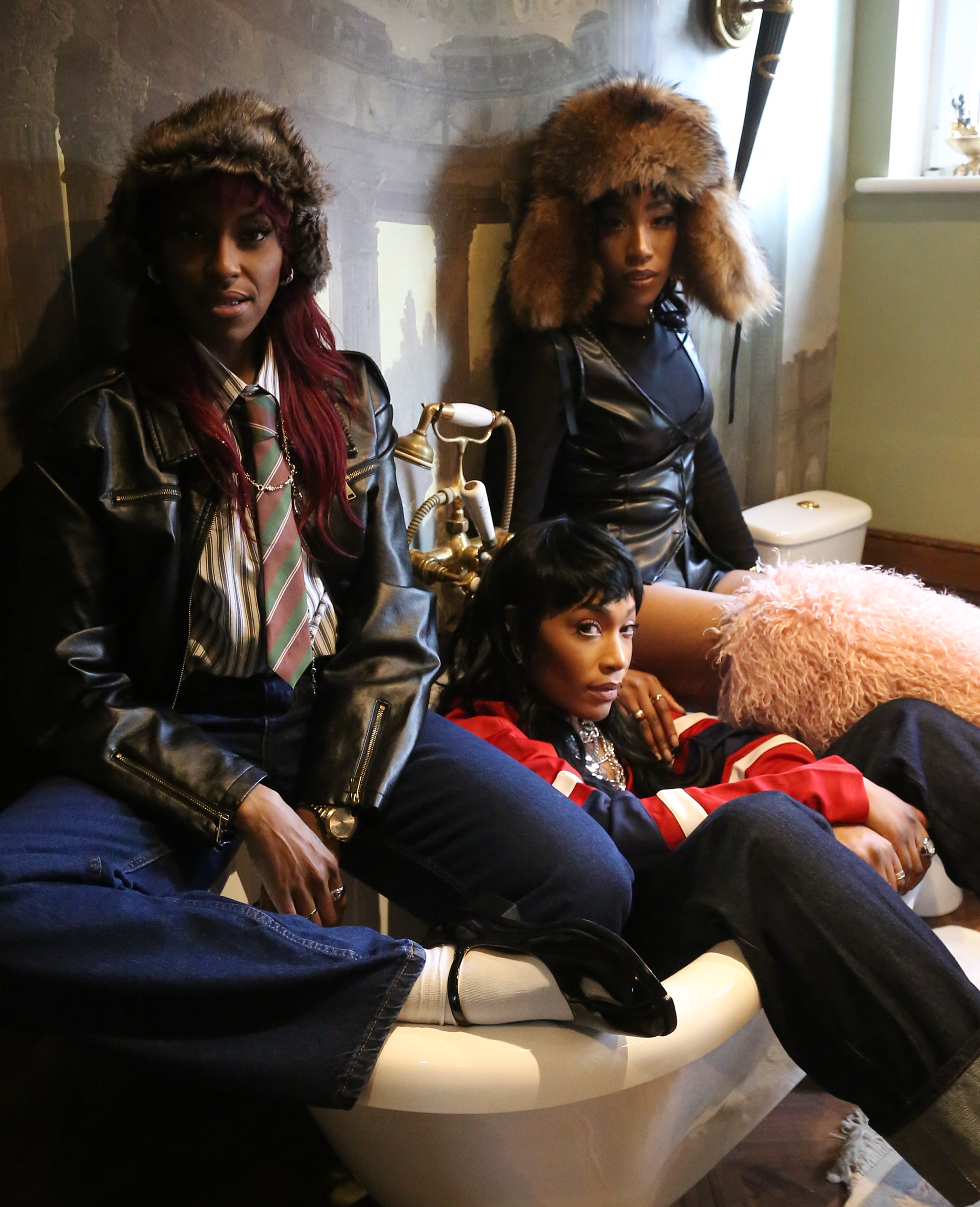

In 2017, SHiiKANE released the song “Oga Police” produced by Kizzbeatz. The song became a viral hit in East Africa. In 2018 The group toured Tanzania, visiting Classic FM Tanzania and met with Vanessa Mdee, Navy Kenzo and Ben Pol. SHiiKANE recorded a song titled ‘Hayaa’ with Tanzanian artist Chin Bees produced by Goncher.

In 2024, SHiiKANE released their debut album Sixty Diamond Seconds, a 16-track project blending Afrobeats, R&B, amapiano, and pop. The record showcased the sisters’ trademark harmonies across high-energy singles such as “4LYF” and "WEREY" along with reflective ensembles like “Toxic” and "Sokoto", and genre-bending tracks including “Casanova”. Critics described the album as a vibrant and emotional debut that established SHiiKANE as a distinctive voice within Afro-Indie music.

Building on that momentum, the group released EP Shards of Eden in May 2025. Consisting of four songs re-imagined from their debut album, the EP was recorded in a stripped-back, one-take live format. Its raw delivery highlighted SHiiKANE’s vocal power and stage presence, drawing praise for its authenticity and indie execution. Together, the two projects mark a creative journey from polished studio experimentation to intimate, performance-driven artistry.

== Philanthropy ==
In 2018, SHiiKANE established the Anthonia’s Women and Children Foundation (AWACF) in honour of their late mother, Anthonia. The foundation focuses on community welfare and health initiatives, including tackling period poverty, providing support services for people living with sickle cell disorder, delivering food assistance to vulnerable households, widening young people’s access to IT education, facilitating access to affordable malaria diagnosis and treatment, and offering bursaries to help cover school fees for children from low-income families.

== Discography ==
=== Albums ===
Year	Album	Label
2025	Shards of Eden (Live EP)	M.A.Records
2024	Sixty Diamond Seconds	M.A.Records
2019	N.W.A (EP)	M.A.Records
2018	Christmas With You (Reloaded EP)	M.A.Records
2016	Christmas With You (EP)	M.A.Records

=== Singles ===
Year	Song	Featured Artist	Producers	Album
2025	Sample (Gbere)	-	Dr. Amir	Sixty Diamond Seconds
2025	Casanova	-	Blaisebeatz	Sixty Diamond Seconds
2024	WEREY	-	Alhaji Tunga - Kizzotouch	Sixty Diamond Seconds
2023	4LYF	-	Blaisebeatz	Sixty Diamond Seconds
2020	Lagbaja	-	Blaisebeatz	N.W.A (EP)
2019	This Year	-	Blaisebeatz	N.W.A (EP)
2018	Yeah Yeah (Lagos City)	DJ MEQ	DJ MEQ	-
2018	Hayaa	Chin Bees		-
2018	Answer Me	-	Dr. Amir, HRH I.A.R	-
2017	Christmas Day	-	Ashley Abigo	Christmas With You (Reloaded EP)
2017	Loke [Remix]	Stonebwoy	Masterkraft (producer)	-
2017	Oga Police	-	Krizbeatz	-
2016	Xmas Love	-	P2J	Christmas With You
2016	Zuga	-	GospelOnDeBeatz	-
2016	Loke	-	Masterkraft (producer)	-
2016	Tuele [Remix]	Orezi	Dr. Amir	-
2015	Come Home	-	P2J	Christmas With You
2015	Tuele	-	Dr. Amir	-
2015	Sweedim	-	P2J	-
2014	Christmas With You	-	P2J	Christmas With You
2014	Sabi	Oritse Femi	Lirrupy	-
2014	SugaKANE	-	P2J	-
2013	Silent Night	-	D-BOY	Christmas With You
2013	Omo Shelen Geh	-	Tee-Y Mix	-
2013	Afurum Gi N’anya (I Love You)	-	Legendury Beatz	-
