= CDQ (rapper) =

Nigerian rapper and songwriter (born 1985)

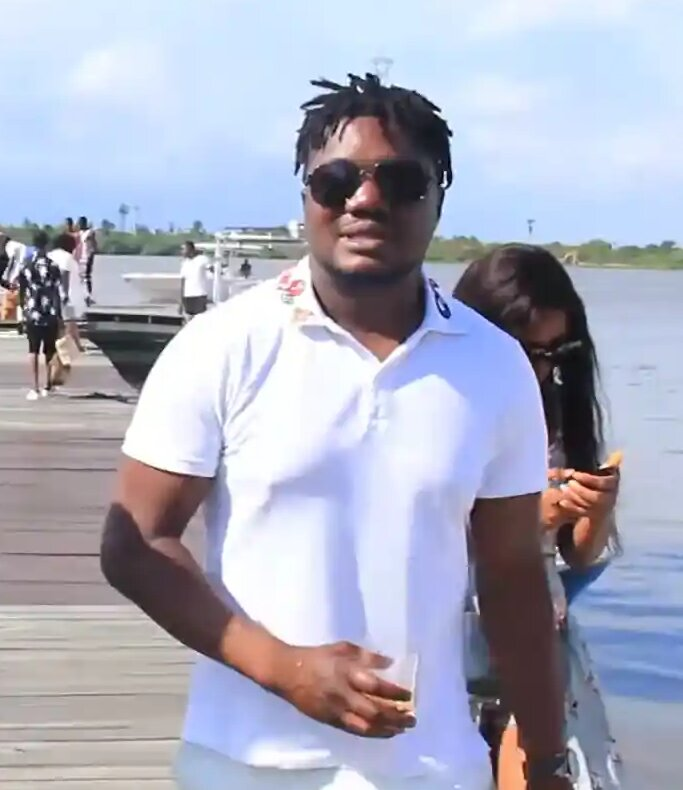

Background information
- Also known as: CDQ olowo
- Born: Sodiq Abubakar Yusuf; May 6, 1985 (age 41); Orile, Lagos State, Nigeria
- Genres: Hip hop; Afrobeats
- Occupations: Rapper; singer; songwriter
- Instrument: Vocals
- Years active: 2008–present
- Labels: General Records (former); No Struggle No Success

Sodiq Abubakar Yusuf (born May 6, 1985) popularly known by his stage name CDQ, is a Nigerian indigenous rapper, singer and songwriter best known for his single "Nowo E Soke" featuring Wizkid and Masterkraft's Indomie where he was featured alongside Olamide. While the former is instrumental for launching his career into the Nigerian music industry, the later won him his first career award at the 2016 Nigerian Music Video Awards. Signed to his label No Struggle No Success Entertainment, CDQ's repertoire of music includes rapping in Yoruba language with addition of ad-libs such as the popular "Woss Wobi" which he invented.

== Early life and education ==
Sodiq Abubakar Yusuf grew up in Ilorin, Kwara State, Nigeria, but was born in Orile, a suburb of Lagos. Upon moving back to Lagos State from Ilorin, where he had completed his secondary school education, he proceeded to further his education at Lagos State University, where he graduated with a BSc in economics.

== Career ==
CDQ started music professionally in 2008 when he used to be a back-up singer for Da Grin before he started rapping in English language with M.I. In 2013, he signed a recording contract with Masterkraft's General Records after winning a rap battle at the weekly Industry Nite in December 2012. In 2014, he released his breakthrough single titled "Indomie" which featured vocals from Olamide while the remix of the song featured Davido. The Masterkraft-produced song brought CDQ's career to limelight and further earned him two nomination spots at the 2015 Nigeria Entertainment Awards and a nomination in the Best Street-Hop Artist category at The Headies 2015.

In anticipation of his debut studio album titled Quality, CDQ enlisted the service of Wizkid with whom he released "Nowo E Soke" as a lead single off the album. The music video for the song was directed by Unlimited L.A and went on to win the Best Afro Hip Hop Video category at the 2016 edition of the Nigeria Music Video Awards. On 16 August 2016, he unveiled the cover art for the album before it was released through General Records on 22 August to positive critical reviews. On 11 November 2016, he launched his own record label N.S.N.S, a short-form for No Struggle No Success Entertainment. On 1 February 2017, he dropped his first official single under the platform titled ' Say Baba ' which was produced by Jay Pizzle.

== Other works ==
Yusuf traveled to Kwara State, to launch an initiative aimed at providing educational materials to secondary school students. In 2019, he paid a visit to the Emir of Ilorin during the first day of his visit, where he discussed plans for a program intended to support students in the state’s secondary schools. During the two-day visit, he and members of his team attended activities organized by one of the schools. The school’s principal arranged a special assembly to receive him. At the event, the musician distributed writing materials and wall clocks to students.

According to his publicist, the initiative known as the CEEI project was designed to address shortages of writing materials in schools, with the aim that secondary schools across Kwara State would benefit from the program.

== Discography ==
=== Selected singles ===
List of singles as lead artist, showing year released and album name
Title	Year	Album
"Ogini" (featuring Runtown)	2014	Non-album singles
"Indomie" (featuring Olamide)	2014	Non-album singles
"Indomie (Remix)" (featuring Olamide and Davido)	2015	Quality
"Salaro"	2015	Quality
"Talosobe"	2015	Quality
"Oobi" (featuring Cayana)	2015	Quality
"Woss Wobi (Freestyle)" (with Olamide)	2015	Non-album single
"Nowo E Soke" (featuring Wizkid)	2016	Quality
"First Come First Serve"	2016	Non-album singles
"Make We Run?"	2016	Non-album singles
"One time" (featuring Lynox and GabanaBwoy)	2016	Non-album singles
"Ko Funny" (featuring Davido)	2017	Non-album singles
"Say Baba"	2017	Non-album singles
"Say Baba (Remix)" (featuring DJ Maphorisa)	2017	Non-album singles
"Bye Bye Poverty"	2017	Non-album singles
"Warey yo"	2018	Non-album singles
"Gbayi" (featuring Kizz Daniel)	2018	Non-album singles
"Shey Normal"	2018	Non-album singles
Flex	2018	Non-album singles
"Aye" (featuring Phyno and Reminisce)	2018	Non-album singles
"Onye Eze" (featuring Zlantan)	2018	Non-album singles
"Jabbing"	2018	Non-album singles
"Fine Boyz"	2018	Non-album singles
"Ghana Must Go"	2019	Non-album singles
"Entertainer" (featuring Davido)	2019	Non-album singles
"Owo"	2020	Non-album singles
" Kogbede" (featuring Wande coal)	2021	Non-album singles
"Who is CDQ"	2021	Vibes and Lifestyle
"Keep On Rocking" (featuring Wande coal)	2021	Vibes and Lifestyle
"Bahamas"	2021	Vibes and Lifestyle
"Slow Down"	2021	Vibes and Lifestyle
"Omoka"	2021	Vibes and Lifestyle

=== Studio albums ===
- Quality
- Ibile Mugabe
- Vibes and Lifestyle

== Selected awards and nominations ==
Year	Award ceremony	Prize	Recipient/Nominated work	Result	Ref
2015	2015 Nigeria Entertainment Awards	Best New Act to Watch	Himself	Nominated	
2015	2015 Nigeria Entertainment Awards	Best Collabo of The Year	"Best Collabo of The Year"	Nominated	
2015	The Headies 2015	Best Street-Hop Artiste	Himself	Nominated	
2016	2016 Nigeria Entertainment Awards	Rap Act of the Year	Himself	Nominated	
2016	Soundcity MVP Awards 2016	Best Hip Hop Artist	Himself	Nominated	
2016	2016 Nigeria Music Video Awards	Best Afro Hip-Hop Video	"Nowo E Soke"	Won	
2017	2017 Ghana-Naija Showbiz Awards	Best Street-Hop Artiste	Himself	Won	
2017	2017 Ghana-Naija Showbiz Awards	Next Superstar On The Roll	Himself	Nominated	
