= Nigeria Entertainment Awards =

Nigerian Award Ceremony

- First award: January 14, 2006; 20 years ago
- Website: http://www.neaawards.org

The Nigerian Entertainment Awards were established in New York City in January 2006. The awards recognize the contributions of African entertainers with a special focus on Nigerians.

== Ceremonies ==
- 2006 Nigeria Entertainment Awards
- 2007 Nigeria Entertainment Awards
- 2008 Nigeria Entertainment Awards
- 2009 Nigeria Entertainment Awards
- 2010 Nigeria Entertainment Awards
- 2011 Nigeria Entertainment Awards
- 2012 Nigeria Entertainment Awards
- 2013 Nigeria Entertainment Awards
- 2014 Nigeria Entertainment Awards
- 2015 Nigeria Entertainment Awards
- 2016 Nigeria Entertainment Awards

== Categories ==
The following are the current categories as of 2016.

=== Musical categories ===
- Best Album of the Year
- Hottest Single of the Year
- Best Music Promoter
- Best New act of the Year
- Gospel Artist of the year
- Indigenous Artist of the Year
- Best Pop/R&B artist of the Year
- Female Artist of the Year
- Male Artist of the Year
- Best Rap Act of the Year
- Music Producer of the Year
- Best Music Video of the Year (Artist & Director)
- Best Collaboration
- Most Promising Act to Watch
- Diaspora Artist of the Year
- African Male Artist of the Year (Non-Nigerian)
- African Female Artist of the Year (Non-Nigerian)

=== Film categories ===
- Best Supporting Actor
- Best Actress in a Lead Role
- Best Supporting Actress
- Best Director of the Year
- Best Picture of the Year
- Best Short Film of the Year
- Best Actor of the Year (TV)
- Best Actress of the Year(TV)
- TV Show of the Year
- Actor of the Year (Non-Nigerian)
- Actress of the Year (Non-Nigerian)
- Best Picture (Non-Nigerian)

=== Other categories ===
- Entertainment Personality of the Year
- Entertainment Executive of the Year
- Best OAP
- Funniest Comedian of Year
- Disk Jockey of the Year (Male)
- Disk Jockey of the Year (Female)
- Disk Jockey Collaboration of the Year
- Disk Jockey of the Year (Non-Nigerian)
- TV Presenter of the Year (Lifestyle)
- Fashion Model of the Year

== 2006-2008 NEA Awards ==
=== 2006 NEA Awards ===
The first edition was held at the Clarice Smith Performing Arts Center at the University of Maryland, College Park on July 28, 2006, and was hosted by comedian Michael Blackson. The event featured performances by Sauce Kid, Sammy Okposo, and Mike Okri. Tuface Idibia and Banky W were amongst the winners of the first edition.

=== 2007 NEA Awards ===
The second edition was held at the NYU Skirball Center for the Performing Arts in New York City in June 2007 and was hosted by comedian Julius Agwu. The 2007 edition featured performances by Banky W, Iceberg Slim, Blak Jesus, and Mike Aremu.

==== Winners ====
- Best album of the year – Grass 2 Grace (Tuface Idibia)
- Hottest single of the year – "Why Me" (Dbanj)
- Best new act of the year – Tosin Martin
- Indigenous musician of the year – Lagbaja
- Best collabo of the year – P Square & Weird Mc (Bizzy Body Remix)
- Best afro pop act of the year – Dbanj
- Gospel artist of the year – Sammy Okposo
- Neo afrobeat artist of the year – Femi Kuti
- Best international album of the year – Return Of The King by eLDee
- Best international single of the year – "Capable" (Banky)
- Best international producer of the year – Mic Tunes
- Best international gospel choir rccg – Jesus House, DC
- Music producer of the year – Don Jazzy
- Battle of U.S. Based DJS – DJ Zimo
- U.S. Based entertainment promoter of the year – Big Moose Entertainment
- Athlete of the year – Obafemi Martins
- Fashion designer of the year Nigerian – Fabrics & Fashion
- Funniest comedian of the year – Julius Agwu
- Best international actor – Adewale Akinnuoye-Agbaje
- Best international actress – Adetoro Makinde
- Nollywood best actor – Ramsey Nouah (Dangerous Twins)
- Nollywood best actress – Stella Damasus Aboderin (Dangerous Twins)
- Nollywood best director – Tade Ogidan (Dangerous Twins)

=== 2008 NEA Awards ===
The third edition was held at the NYU Skirball Center for the Performing Arts in New York City in June 2008 and was hosted by actor Raz Adoti (Amistad) and Tatiana from the 2007 season of Big Brother Africa. The 2007 edition featured performances by Dekunle Fuji and Tosin Martin. The event also featured Ramsey Nouah and supermodel Oluchi's presentation of the Best Actor Award to actor Olu Jacobs.

==== Winners ====
- Best Album of the Year: ASA by Asa
- Hottest Single of the Year: "Yahooze" by Olu Maintain
- Best New Act of the Year: TY Bello
- Best Afro Pop Act of the Year: 9ice
- Best Gospel Act of the Year: Dekunle Fuji
- Music Producer of the Year: Dr Frabs
- Best Music Video of the Year: "Do Me" by P Square
- Best International Single of the Year: "Spray Me Money" Remix by Oladele ft. Eldee
- Best International Album of the Year: Chapter XIII by Keno
- Best International Producer of the Year: T Money
- Best International Music Video of the Year: "Wetin Man Go Do" by Amplifyd Crew
- International Event of the Year (presented to a promoter): NRC Reunion
- Best World DJ: DJ Humility
- Best Comedian: Basorge
- Best Film: Blessed Among Women
- Best Actor: Olu Jacobs
- Best Actress: Kate Henshaw
- U.S. Based Promoter of the Year: Tribe X Entertainment

== 2009-present NEA Awards ==
=== 2009 NEA Awards ===
In 2009, the fourth edition of the NEA Awards was held at Howard University's Cramton Auditorium in DC. The event was hosted by comedian Basorge and co-hosted by actresses Omoni Oboli and Ebbe Bassey. The event also featured performances by YQ, Midnight Crew, Toba Gold, Bigiano and J Martins.

==== Winners ====
- Best album of the year – Entertainer (D’Banj)
- Hottest single of the year – "Good Or Bad" (J Martins)
- Best new act of the year – M.I.
- Gospel artist of the year – Midnight Crew
- Music producer of the year – ID Cabasa
- Best rapper – M.I.
- Best music video of year – Not The Girl (Darey)
- Best international artist – Iceberg Slim
- Indigenous artist of the year – 9ICE
- Best international producer of the year – Dapo Torimiro
- Event of the year – This day/Arise NY fashion week by This day
- Best world DJ – DJ Neptune
- Best comedian – I Go Die
- Best actor – Jim Ikye
- Best actress – Funke Akindele

=== 2010 NEA Awards ===
The 2010 edition was held at the third edition was also held on September 18, 2011, at the BMCC Tribeca Performing Arts Center in New York and was hosted by Singer Omawumi. The event featured performances by Lara George, Jesse Jagz, Omawumi, MI and Tuface Idibia. Lara George, Jesse Jagz, Omawumi, MI and Tuface Idibia also all received awards at this ceremony.

==== Winners ====
- Best album of the year – CEO (DaGrin)
- Hottest single of the year – "Free Madness" (Terry G)
- Best new act of the year – Jesse Jagz
- Gospel artist of the year – Lara George
- Most promising act to watch – Mocheddah
- Indigenous artist of the year – Nneka
- Best pop/R&B artist of the year – Omawumi
- Best rap act of the year – M.I.
- Best soul/neo soul act of the year – Tuface
- Music producer of the year – J. Sleek
- Best male music video of the year (artist & director) – "Implication" (Tuface) Godfather
- Best female music video of the year (artist & director) – "Today Na Today" (Omawumi) Kemi Adetiba
- Best actor in a film/short story – Jim Iyke (The Shepherd / Dream Maker)
- Best actress in a film/short story – Nse Ikpe-Etim (Reloaded)
- Best director – Kunle Afolayan (The Figurine)
- International event of the year (to a promoter) – Arise Fashion Week New York
- Entertainment personality of the year – Keke and D1
- Best actress in a TV series/reality/game show – Genevieve Nnaji (Guinness Ultimate Survivor Celebrity Edition)
- Best collaboration with vocals – "Kefee" ft. Time
- Best international artist – Wale
- Best international producer of the year – Kid Konnect
- Best actor in TV series/reality/game show – Gideon Okeke
- Best on screen personality (people's choice award) – Denrele
- Best TV series/reality show/game show – Tinsel
- Best radio personality – Olisa Adibua
- Best comedian – A.Y
- Best world DJ – DJ Xclusive

=== 2011 NEA Awards ===
The seventh edition was held on September 2, 2011, at the Symphony Space Sharp Theater in New York and was hosted by comedian Julius Agwu and actress Funke Akindele (aka "Jenifa"). The event featured performances by Jesse Jagz, Ice Prince, Waje, Sound Sultan, Sam Klef and MI. Lara George, Ice Prince, Waje, Sam Klef and MI all took home awards at this ceremony.

==== Winners ====
- Album of the year – MI2 (MI)
- Hottest Single of the Year – "Oleku" (Ice Prince)
- Best New Act of the Year – Wizkid
- Gospel Artist of the Year – Lara George
- Best Pop/R&B Artist of the Year – Waje
- Best Rap Act of The Year – M.I
- Music Producer of The Year – Samklef
- Best International Artist – Nneka
- Best Music Video of the Year – "Eni Duro" (Olamide) – DJ Tee
- Most Promising Act to Watch – Jhybo
- Entertainment Executive of the Year – Audu Maikori (Chocolate City)
- Indigenous Artist of the Year – Duncan Mighty
- Pan African Artist or Group of the Year – Fally Ipupa
- Best US-based Male Artist of the Year – Rotimi
- Best US-based Female Artist of the Year – Naira
- Best Actor in a Film/Short Story – Ramsey Nouah (A Private Storm)
- Best Actress in a Film/Short Story – Omoni Oboli (Anchor Baby)
- Best Picture (Producer) – Inale (Jeta Amata)
- Best Directing in a Film/Short Story – Lancelot Oduwa Imasuen/Ikechukwu Onyeka (A Private Storm)
- Best Actor in TV Series/Reality/Game Show – Frank Edoho (Who Wants To Be A Millionaire)
- Best Actress in TV Series/Reality/Game Show – Damilola Adegbite (Tinsel)
- Pan African Actress of the Year (Film/Short Story) – Jackie Appiah
- Pan African Actor of the Year (Film/Short Story) – Chris Attoh
- Comedian of the Year – Gordon
- Best World DJ – DJ Obi (Boston)
- Entertainment Promoter of the Year – Tiwaworks (Atlanta, US)

=== 2012 NEA Awards ===
The seventh edition was held on September 2, 2012, at the New York University Skirball Performing Arts Center in New York and was hosted by AY the comedian and actress Funke Akindele (aka "Jenifa"). The event featured performances by Brymo, Seyi Shay, Ice Prince, Vector, Waje, Banky W., Skales, WizKid. Appearances were made by Don Jazzy, Davido, Vivian Ndour, D'Prince, Sarkodie, Gbenga Akinnagbe, Uche Jumbo, Susan Peters, and Juliet Ibrahim.

==== Winners ====
- Best Album of the Year Superstar – Wizkid
- Hottest single of the year – "Dami Duro", Davido
- Best New Act of the year - Davido
- Gospel artist/group of the year - Tim Godfrey
- Best pop/r&b artist of the year - Wizkid
- Best rap act of the year - Vector
- Music producer of the year - Don Jazzy
- Best international artist - Tinie Tempah
- Best music video of the year – "Nawti" (Olu Maintain)
- Most promising act to watch – Eva
- Pan African artist or group of the year – Vivian Ndour
- Best US based artist of the year – Awon Boyz
- Best indigenous artist/group -Flavour
- Best collabo of the year - "Sauce Kid" ft. Davido (Carolina)
- Best actor (film) – Wale Ojo (Phone Swap)
- Best actress (film) – Funke Akindele (Troj)
- Best picture – Phone Swap
- Best TV Show – Big Brother Africa
- Best film director – Kunle Afolayan (Phone Swap)
- Pan African actor – Majid Michel (Somewhere in Africa)
- Pan African actress - Yvonne Okoro (Single Six)
- World DJ – Jimmy Jatt (Nigeria)
- Entertainment Executive of the year – Eldee

=== 2013 NEA winners ===
==== Winners ====
- Best Album of the Year: YBNL – Olamide
- Hottest Single of the Year: "Kukere" – Iyanya
- Best New Act of the Year: Burna Boy
- Gospel Artist/Group of the Year: Sammy Okposo
- Best Pop/R&B Artist of the Year: Davido
- Best Rap Act of the Year: Ice Prince
- Music Producer of the Year: Spellz
- Music Video of the Year: Ghetto – "Shank" (Patrick Ellis)
- Most Promising Male Act to Watch: Endia
- Most Promising Female Act to Watch: Emma Nyra
- Eastern African Artiste or Group of the Year: Navio
- Western African Artiste or Group of the Year: Sarkodie
- Southern African Artist or Group of the Year: Zahara
- Best International Artiste: JJC Skillz
- Best Indigenous Artiste/Group: Olamide
- Best Collaboration: Ghost Mode – Phyno ft. Olamide
- Best Lead Actor in Film: OC Ukeje (Alan Poza)
- Best Lead Actress in a Film: Rita Dominic (The Meeting)
- Best Supporting Actor in a Film: Ali Nuhu (Blood and Henna)
- Best Supporting Actress in a Film: Tunde Aladese (Confusion Na Wa)
- Best Film Director: Tunde Kelani (Maami)
- Best Picture (Film Producer): Last Flight to Abuja (Obi Emelonye)
- Best TV Show: Big Brother Africa
- Best Pan African Actor: John Dumelo (Letters to My Mother)
- Best Pan African Actress: Nadia Buari (Single & Married)
- Best World DJ: DJ Bayo (UK)
- Best Comedian: Basketmouth
- Best Entertainment Promoter: Coko Bar
- Best Radio/TV Personality: Freeze of CoolFM
- Best TV Personality: Labi Layori
- Best Entertainment Blog: NotJustOk
- Best Entertainment Executive: Ubi Franklin
- Best International Actor: Dayo Okeniyi
- Best International Actress: Hope Olaide Wilson

=== 2014 NEA Awards ===
The 9th year the Nigeria Entertainment Awards celebrated and honored members of the Nigerian entertainment industry in New York, at the NYU Skirball Center for Performing Arts. Performances included those of Wande Coal, Praiz, Oritsefemi, the 'Sekem' master MCGalaxy, and the crowd pleaser ShattaWale. Also on stage were Patoranking, who performed his popular song "Girlie O", and Skales with his new single "Shake Body".

Hosts for the night Bovi and Funke Akindele kept the audience entertained with jokes, while Gbemi Olateru-Olagbegi worked the audience by interacting and asking questions to keep them engaged and even more involved in the show than in years past.

==== Winners ====
Music categories

- Best Album of the Year - Baddest Boy Ever Liveth (Olamide)
- Hottest Single of the Year - "Pull Over" (Kcee ft. Wizkid) / "Aye" (Davido) (tie)
- Best New Act of the Year - Patoranking
- Gospel Artist of the Year - Frank Edwards
- Indigenous Artist of the Year - Oritshe Femi
- Best Pop/R&B Artist of the Year - Tiwa Savage
- Female Artist of the Year - Tiwa Savage
- Male Artist of the Year - Davido
- Best Rap Act of the Year - Ice Prince
- Music Producer of the Year - Del B
- Best Music Video of the Year (Artist & Director) - "Rands & Naira" (Emmy Gee & Nick)
- Best Collaboration - "Gallardo" (Runtown Ft. Davido)
- Most Promising Act to Watch - Ayo Jay
- Diaspora Artist of the Year - L.A.X
- African Artist of the Year (Non-Nigerian) - Shatta Wale

Film categories

- Best Actor in a Lead Role - Tope Tedela (A Mile from Home)
- Best Supporting Actor - Yomi Fash Lanso (Omo Elemosho)
- Best Actress in a Lead Role - Funke Akindele in Agnetta (O'Mpa)
- Best Supporting Actress - Genevieve Nnaji (Half of a Yellow Sun)
- Best Director - Desmond Elliott (Finding Mercy)
- Best Picture - Half of a Yellow Sun

Other categories

- Entertainment Personality of the Year - Denrele Edun (Channel O)
- Entertainment Executive of the Year - E Money (Five Star Music)
- Best OAP - Yaw (Wazobia FM)
- Funniest Comedian of the Year - Bovi and baske mouth tie
- World DJ - DJ Spinall
- Best entertainment blog - Bella Naija ...

=== 2015 NEA Awards ===
The 10th edition of the Nigeria Entertainment Awards was held on Sunday, the 6 September 2015 at the NYU Skirball Center for Performing Arts, New York. Nollywood actress Osas Ighodaro and Chocolate City artist, Ice Prince, anchored the successful event.

The sold-out event was attended by many celebrities, including Pasuma, Jerry Wonder, Kevin Lyttle, Fally Ipupa, DJ Abass, Juliet Ibrahim, DJ Cuppy, Sunkanmi, Ayojay, Emma Nyra, Bimbo Thomas, Ruth Kadiri, Destiny Amaka, Sonia Ibrahim, Chiney Ogwumike, Gbenro Ajibade, Jimmie, Maria Okan, Swanky Jerry, Mimi Onalaja, Tjan, and Toby Grey.

Performances included those by Yemi Alade, Praiz, MC Galaxy, Eddie Kenzo, Sheyman, Jaywon, Niniola, Mr. 2Kay, KAVHS, and Simi.

The show also had some industry business executives in attendance, such as Howie T (Baseline Records), Ayo Shonaiya, Jason Oshiokpekhai (Delta Air Lines), Kobi Brew-Hammond (Arik Air), Dan Petruzzi (OkayPlayer), Abiola Oke (OkayAfrica), Chetachi Nwoga (Chibase), Jason Kpana (Tidal), Briant Biggs (Roc Nation), Roslin Ilori (Mtech), and Suilemana (Right Ent).

Also in attendance were prominent Nigerians, from politicians to businessmen, including Hon. Demola Seriki, Comrade Timi Frank, Chief Terry Wayas, and Bankole Omishore.

==== Winners ====
Music categories

- Album of the Year: Thankful (Flavour)
- Hottest Single of the Year: "Ojuelegba" (Wizkid)
- Male Artist of the Year: Wizkid
- Best Best Music Pro Of the Year: Fredoo Perry
- Female Artist of the Year: Yemi Alade
- Best Pop Artist of the Year: Davido
- Rap Act of the Year: Olamide
- Best R&B Artist of the Year: Praiz
- Best Collaboration of the Year: "Bad Girl Special" Remix (Mr. 2 Kay)
- Best Dance Live Performance: MC Galaxy
- Best Music Video of the Year (Director): Unlimited L.A
- Best New Act to Watch: Kiss Daniel
- Indigenous Artist of the Year: Pasuma
- Diaspora Artist of the Year: Styleez
- Gospel Artist of the Year: Tope Alabi
- Most Promising Act to Watch: Simi
- Music Producer of the Year: Shizzi
- African Artist of the Year (Non-Nigerian): Eddie Kenzo
- Afrobeat Artist of the Year: 2face Idibia

Film/TV categories

- Actor of the Year (indigenous films): Adekola Odunlade
- Actor of the Year (Nollywood): Gabriel Afolayan
- Actress of the Year (indigenous films): Toyin Aimakhu Johnson
- Actress of the Year (Nollywood): Ruth Kadri
- Actress of the Year (Nigeria in Hollywood): Adepero Oduye
- Actor of the Year (Nigeria in Hollywood): Chiwetel Ejiofor
- Actor of the Year (Africa): Majid Michel
- Actress of the Year (Africa): Sonia Ibrahim
- Film Director of the Year (indigenous films): Olanrewaju Abiodun
- Film Director of the Year (Nollywood): Kunle Afolayan (October 1)
- Film Director of the Year (Africa): Alex Konstantaras
- Film of the Year (indigenous films): Alakada
- Film of the Year (producer, Nollywood): October 1
- Film of the Year (producer, Africa): Shattered Romance

Other categories

- Female Disc Jockey of the Year: DJ Cuppy
- Male Disc Jockey of the Year: DJ Kaywise
- Entertainment Executive of the Year: Tobi Sanni
- Entertainment Personality of the Year: Jimmy
- Entertainment TV Programme of the Year: Jenifas Diary
- OAP of the Year: Dotun (Cool FM)
- Comedy Act of the Year: Bovi

=== 2016 NEA Awards ===
The 2016 Nigeria Entertainment Awards is the 11th edition of the Nigeria Entertainment Awards. Hosted by Richard Mofe Damijo and Ebbe Bassey, the event was held on September 4 at the BMCC Tribeca Performing Arts Center in New York City, U.S.

==== Winners ====
Music categories

- Album of the Year: Eyan Mayweather (Olamide)
- Hottest Single of the Year: "Mama" (Kizz Daniel)
- Song of the Year: "Pick Up" (Adekunle Gold)
- Afropop Artist of the Year: Kizz Daniel
- R&B Artist of the Year: Seyi Shay
- Rap Artist of the Year: Olamide
- Gospel of the Year: Frank Edwards
- Dancehall Artist of the Year: Ketchup
- Indigenous Artist of the Year: Flavour
- Alternative Artist of the Year: Aramide
- Best New Act to Watch: Adekunle Gold
- Most Promising Act to Watch: Mr. Eazi
- Diaspora Artist of the Year: Ayojay
- Best Collaboration of the Year: "My Woman, My Everything" Patoranking ft Wande Coal
- Best Live Performance of the Year: 2Baba
- Best Music Video of the Year (Director): "Unlimited L.A" Emergency (Dbanj)
- Africa Male Artist of the Year (Non-Nigerian): Shatta Wale
- Africa Female Artist of the Year (Non-Nigerian): Efya
- Music Producer of the Year: Masterkraft

Film/TV categories

- Lead Actor of the Year: Joseph Benjamin (Rebecca)
- Lead Actress of the Year: Fathia Balogun (Ishanna)
- Supporting Actor in a Film: Sambasa Nzeribe (A Soldier's Story)
- Supporting Actress in a Film: Osas Ighodaro (Gbomo Gbomo Express)
- Film Director of the Year: Frankie Ogar (A Soldier's Story)
- Best Picture of the Year: Ishanna
- Best Short Film of the Year: Bloody Taxi (Folasakin Iwajomo)
- Best Actor of the Year (TV): Folarin Falana (Jenifa's Diary)
- Best Actress of the Year (TV): Abimbola Craig – (Skinny Girl in Transit)
- TV Show of the Year: Skinny Girl in Transit
- Actor of the Year (Non-Nigerian): Abraham Attah (Beast of No Nation)
- Actress of the Year (Non-Nigerian): Nuong Faalong (Freetown)
- Best Picture of the Year (Non-Nigerian): Beast of No Nation

Other categories

- Female Disc Jockey of the Year: DJ Mystelle
- Male Disc Jockey of the Year: DJ Gravpop
- Disc Jockey Collaboration of the Year: DJ Kaywise ft. Oritse Femi – "Warn Dem"
- Disc Jockey of the Year (Non-Nigerian): DJ Gravpop DJ Slick Stuart & Roja
- Music Executive of the Year: Don Jazzy (Mavin Records)
- OAP of the Year: Tisan Jeremiah Bako (Raypower FM)
- TV Presenter of the Year (Lifestyle): Daala (Ovation)
- Comedy Act of the Year: Basketmouth
- Fashion Model of the Year: Mayowa Nicholas
- Online Comedy Act of the Year: Emmanuella

=== 2017 NEA Awards ===
The 2017 Nigeria Entertainment Awards is the 12th edition of the Nigeria Entertainment Awards. Hosted by Singer Emma Nyra, the event was held on November 25 at the Symphony Space Peter Sharp Theater in New York City. The show featured performances by Olamide aka Baddo and also in attendance was Superstar Davido and his protege Mayorkun. Also in attendance were many notable names including Seyi Shay, Young Paris, Dremo, Sheyman, ID Cabasa, DJ Enimoney, Danagog, Dotman, D12, and many others.

==== Winners ====
Music categories

- Album of the Year: Glory (Olamide)
- Hottest Single of the Year: If (Davido)
- AfroPop Male Artist of the Year: Davido
- AfroPop Female Artist of the Year: Seyi Shay
- Rap Act of the Year: Olamide
- Best Music Promoter & Blogger: Prince Fredoo Perry
- Dancehall Artist of the Year: Patoranking
- Best Collabo of the Year: Iskaba (Wande Coal & DJ Tunez)
- Best Music Video of the Year (Director): Meji Alabi (Yolo, Seyi Shay)
- Best New Act of the Year: Mayorkun
- Indigenous Artist of the Year: Phyno
- Best Promising Act Of The Year: Kaptain Kush
- Diaspora Artist of the Year: Jidenna
- Inspirational Artist of the Year: Sinach
- Most Promising Act to Watch: Deshinor
- Music Producer of the Year: Krisbeatz
- African Male Artist of the Year (Non-Nigerian): Toofan
- African Female Artist of the Year (Non-Nigerian): Becca

Film/TV categories

- Best Actor of the Year: Ransey Noauh (76)
- Best Actress of the Year: Funke Akindele (A Trip to Jamaica)
- Supporting Actor of the Year: AY (A Trip to Jamaica)
- Supporting Actress of the Year: Kehinde Bankole (The Dinner)
- Film Director of the Year: Steve Gukas (93 Days)
- Best Picture of the Year: The Wedding Party
- Best Lead Role in TV: Oreka Godis (Our Best Friend's Wedding)
- Best Lead Role in Film (Non-Nigerian / Africa): Korto Davies
- Best TV Show: Big Brother Naija

Other categories

- Nigeria Youngest Promoter of the Year: Prince Fredoo Perry
- Best Disc Jockey of the Year: DJ Prince
- Diaspora Disc Jockey of the Year: DJ Phemstar (U.S.)
- Africa Disc Jockey of the Year: DJ Slick Stuat & Roja (UG)
- Entertainment Executive of the Year: Tobi Sanni Daniel
- OAP of the Year: Big Tak (Urban FM)
- TV Presenter of the Year: Seyitan (The Sauce)
- Best Comedy Act of the Year: Woli Arole & Asiri
- Photographer of the Year: Kelechi Amadi

=== 2018 NEA Awards ===
The 2018 Nigeria Entertainment Awards was held on November 10, 2018, at The UDC Performing Art Center, Washington, DC.

=== 2019 NEA Awards ===
The 2019 Nigeria Entertainment Awards was originally scheduled to take place outside of the U.S. for the first time in Johannesburg, South Africa in November 2019 but was cancelled due to escalated cases of Xenophobia.

=== 2020 NEA Awards ===
The 2020 Nigeria Entertainment Awards was originally scheduled for Fall of 2020 but due to the COVID19 pandemic, the Awards was rescheduled for 2021.

== Executive team ==
Current Executive Producers:

- Tope Esan
- Cosmas Collins
- Azeem Jolasun

Previous Executive Producers:

- Linda Ofukeme (2006-2006)
- Joy Tongo (2006–2008)
- Belinda Nosegbe (2006–2008)
- Seun Tagh (2006–2009)
- Dolapo OA (2006–2009)
- Martin Fayomi (2006–2015)
