= BMCC Tribeca Performing Arts Center =

Venue in New York City, US

- Interactive map of BMCC Tribeca Performing Arts Center
- Address: 190 Chambers Street; New York City; United States
- Coordinates: 40.717284°N 74.012212°W
- Capacity: Theatre One: 913; Theatre Two: 262

Construction
- Opened: 1983

Website
- http://tribecapac.org/

BMCC Tribeca Performing Arts Center is a performing arts venue located in Lower Manhattan inside the Borough of Manhattan Community College (BMCC) on 199 Chambers Street, New York, NY. Tribeca's two main theater spaces are Theatre One (a 913-seat theater) and Theatre Two (which is 262 seats), both of which can be rented out. The venue's programming includes music concerts, children's theater, stand-up acts, film retrospectives as well as local and international dance companies. It has also been one of the venues for the annual Tribeca Film Festival.
