= Samir Bağırov =

Samir Bagirov
- Genres: Pop; R&B; dance-pop; rock; jazz; new-age
- Occupations: Singer-songwriter, musician
- Years active: 1988–present

Samir Bağırov (August 21, 1967, Baku) is an Azerbaijani pop singer. Samir Bagirov is considered one of the founders of modern pop music in Azerbaijan. The singer has always been distinguished by his unusual appearance.

== Life and career ==
=== 1967-1987: Early Life ===
Born as Samir Rafiq oğlu İsayev, using his paternal grandmother's surname instead of his Tatar father's surname, was born on August 21, 1967, in Baku/Azerbaijan. He was admitted to the classical vocal department of the Baku Music Academy. During his studies at the conservatory, he was drafted into the Soviet army, where he performed as a soloist in the military ensemble's concerts. He completed his military service in Ukraine. After completing his military service, he continued and finished his education at the conservatory. He began his career working with the state orchestra "Gaya" under the leadership of Teymur Mirzoyev.

=== 1988-1991: Baku Autumn 1988 ===
In 1988, Samir İsayev entered the Baku Autumn competition organized by Sevinj Karimova, performing "He Uletay," composed by Aziza Mustafazade, and duetted, alongside Sevil Hajiyeva, a song called "Inaniram," with music by Mikayil Vakilov and lyrics by Malik Farrukh. "Inaniram" earned him a special award.

Following the competition, in 1989, Samir continued his musical education at the Gnessin State Musical College in Moscow. At Gnessin, Samir not only took vocal lessons but also learned stage manners, dance, and how to dress on stage.

=== 1991-1992: Yalta-91 and Moscow-Yalta-Transit ===
In 1991, Baghirov won second place at the "Yalta-91" competition. During this competition, he performed Rashid Behbudov's "Sevgilim". At the winners' concert, he performed Whitney Houston's "All at Once". After the Yalta competition, the famous Russian composer Igor Krutoy composed the songs "Malenkoye Kafe" and "Otzovis" for Samir. Both songs were performed on popular channels like Channel One Russia and RTR in shows such as "Utrennaya Pocht," "Pesnya Goda," "Hit Parad Ostankino," and "Wider Circle".

In 1992, the song "Otzovis" placed fifth in a competition held by Mayak Radio and became one of the ten most popular songs in the CIS. Following these successes, Samir Baghirov received an offer from the theater created by Alla Pugacheva. However, the theater disbanded a year later, and at the request of Polad Bulbuloglu, Samir returned to his homeland.

=== 1993-1999: Taleyin oyunu ===
In 1993, Baghirov held his first solo concert at the "Respublika" Palace, featuring songs by Eldar Mansurov and Zaur Abdullayev. Between 1993 and 1994, Samir performed in various show concerts with the groups Show-Duet and Aypara at the Azerbaijan State Song Theatre, the Rashid Behbudov State Song Theatre, the Yaşıl Teatr ("Green Theatre"), the Tofiq Bahramov Republican Stadium, the Baku State Circus, the Heydar Aliyev Palace, and other concert halls.

In 1995, the music video for self-penned song "Ostrov Lyubvi" won first place at a CIS music video competition. In 1996, Samir held his second solo concert at the "Respublika" Palace titled "Мы так любим друг друга" (We Love Each Other So Much) and another concert titled "Samir Baghirov and Friends." During the 90s, he was invited as an honorary guest for Voice Of Asia. Additionally, at the end of the 90s, he won against Murat Nasirov in the Musical Square song competition showned on the Azerbaijiani TV channel Space.

=== 2000-2001: Sevgilim ===
In 2000, Samir Baghirov decided to remake "Sevgilim," into a more contemporary style. The new version became an immediate hit. The music video for the new version, directed by Stas Rubenchik, won The Best award. Following the release of the new music video, Bağırov's first solo album "Sevgilim XXI" was released.

On August 12, 2001, a charity concert titled "Sevgilim XXI" was held in Sumqayıt at the DK Chemists named after Uz. Hajibeyov. This event featured Baghirov, as well as performances by Russian drama theater actor Eldar Bagirbekov and dancer Naila Dadasheva.

=== 2001-2007: Hiatus ===
At the end of 2007, Baghirov decided to take a break from performing though he would still continue making appearances in different show programs. Although Samir did not publicly disclose the reason for his departure from the stage, he mentioned in an interview with journalist Seymur Zakaryayev that media scandals and changes in the music scene took a toll on his creativity.

=== 2010-2016: Comeback | Səninlə ===
After many years away from the stage, Baghirov returned to performing in 2010 with a new song, "Son Yarpaq" (Last Leaf), while appearing on numerous shows as a guest. In 2011, he performed a duet titled "Sənin üçün" (For You) with Zulfiyya Khanbabayeva. In 2016, Samir Baghirov performed a duet titled "Səninlə" (With You) with Aygun Kazimova.

== Artistry ==
=== Influences ===
Baghirov's influences include Alla Pugacheva, Muslim Magomayev, Rashid Behbudov and Whitney Houston. In his interviews, he often emphasized his childhood admiration for Alla Pugacheva. In one of his interviews from the 1990s, he referred to Whitney Houston as a "phenomenon of pop music."

=== Musical Style ===
In 2000, Baghirov won the Best Multi-Genres Singer award. Throughout his career, he has explored various musical genres, including pop, jazz, pop rock, soul, R&B, flamenco, and New Age. According to Baghirov, jazz music played a significant role in shaping him as a singer. Many of his compositions are dedicated to love, such as the song "Отпусти" (Let Go), which was dedicated to the memory of his friend Sima Bashirova, who had died in 1998.

== Judging appearances ==
In 2000 and 2001, Samir Baghirov was invited to join the jury of the "Baku Autumn 2000 and 2001" competitions.. Five years later, he served as a judge in the "Academy Music Show" competition organized by Brilliant Dadashova.

== Music videos ==
Throughout his career, Bağırov has portrayed various personas in all of his music videos, showcasing diverse characters and styles. In 1989, he appeared alongside Sevil Hajiyeva for the music video for Brilliant Dadashova's song "Bayatılar". In 1993, the two appeared again in Bağırov's music video for the song "De, kim eşitsin?".

Samir Baghirov first achieved success in his own music videos with "Sevgi Adası" (Love Island) in 1995, winning first place in the CIS region. In 2000, he returned to the spotlight with the music video for "Sevgilim" (My Lover).

=== List of music videos ===
- De, kim eşitsin?
- Остров Любви (Love Island)
- Sevgilim XXI
- Yağışın Nəğməsi (Song of rain)
- Mənsiz (Without me)
- Милая (My Pretty)
- Axtarıram
- Deyirdim sənə
- Sənsizlik
- Sevmədin gülüm
- Dön (2025)

== Discography ==
=== Albums ===
- Sevgilim XXI (2000)
- Sensizlik (2004)

=== Duets ===
- "Səninlə" (feat. Aygün Kazımova)
- "Gözəl vətən" (feat. Flora Kərimova)
- "Geri verərmi" (feat. Brilliant Dadaşova)
- "De, kim eşitsin?" (featuring Sevil Hacıyeva)
- "Inanıram" (feat. Sevil Hacıyeva)
- "True Love" (feat. Manana Caparidze)
- "Bir daha" (feat. Aygün Kazımova)
- "Sənin üçün" (feat. Zülfiyyə Xanbabayeva)
- "Xəbər səndən heç yox" (feat. Samirə Allahverdiyeva)
- "Sənsiz keçən ilk gecəm" (feat. Xatun Əliyeva)
- "Миражи" (feat. Aygün Kazımova)

== Tours and Televised Concerts ==
=== World tours ===
- "Yalta 91" The Winners Concert
- "Song Of Year" (1991) in Russia
- Theatre of Russia (1992)
- Concert Tour with Manana Japaridze (2000 year)

=== Regional tours ===
- Concert in Republic Palace in 1993
- "Narkodunya" concert in 1993
- Show Ilgar Hayal in 1993
- Rock Concert with band "TAC"
- "We love each other so much" in 1996
- Concert with Manana Japaridze Palace Named Of Shahriyar (2003)

=== Televised concerts ===
- The Winners of Baku Autumn 1988
- New Year Concert (1997), AzTV
- New Year Concert, ABA TV
- Musical challenge, Space TV
- Garden of Stars, Space TV
- Birthday Concert of Samir Bağırov "30 years old"
- Birthday Concert of Samir Bağırov (2003)
- Sabir Rustamkhanli music evening concert
- Vagif Gerayzade's concert tribute
- Muslim Magomayev 60th Birthday Tribute
- Rashid Behbudov 90th Birthday Tribute
