= W.A.J.E =

Studio album by Waje
- Released: 1 May 2013
- Genre: R&B; afro pop; highlife; soul; jazz; reggae; electropop; world; alternative hip-hop
- Length: 56:10
- Label: Waje Musik Entertainment
- Producer: Del B; Spellz; E Kelly; Sizzle Pro; Cobhams Asuquo; J. Martins; Pappi J; LeriQ; M.I

Waje chronology
The Singles (2011)	W.A.J.E (2013)	Red Velvet (2018)

Singles from W.A.J.E
- 1. "Oko Mi" Released: 1 September 2012; 2. "I Wish" Released: 1 September 2012; 3. "Na the Way (Remix)" Released: 23 April 2013; 4. "Onye" Released: 22 July 2014; 5. "No Be You" Released: 2 October 2014

W.A.J.E (a backronym for Words Aren't Just Enough) is the debut studio album by Nigerian singer Waje. It was released on 1 May 2013 through Waje Musik Entertainment, and features guest appearances from M.I, Tiwa Savage, J. Martins, Sarkodie, Eva, Phyno, and Burna Boy. Production was handled by Del B, Spellz, E Kelly, Sizzle Pro, Cobhams Asuquo, J. Martins, Pappi J, LeriQ, and M.I. It was supported by the singles "Oko Mi", "I Wish", "Na the Way (Remix)", "Onye", and "No Be You". W.A.J.E was nominated for Hip Hop World Revelation of the Year at the Headies 2013.

== Background ==
Before the release of W.A.J.E, Waje gained attention through several collaborations and singles. Her career began in 2007 with "Bobo Mi", a remix of P-Square's "Omoge Mi", which led to her featuring on the duo's track "Do Me". While signed to her former record label Dome Records, Waje released singles like "Somewhere" and "Kolo", which helped build her profile but did not result in a full-length project. After leaving the label, she worked independently, leading to the production of W.A.J.E.

In May 2012, Waje told The NET that she worked with Cobhams Asuquo, eLDee, M.I, and Tee-Y Mix and the album consisted of twelve songs and two bonus tracks, though this information may have been modified in time of the official release of the album. She revealed the release date of the album on 18 April 2013. She revealed the artwork and tracklist on 27 April 2013.

== Singles ==
The album's lead single, "Oko Mi", and second single, "I Wish", were released simultaneously on 1 September 2012. "Oko Mi" was written and produced by Del B. The low-tempo reggae-influenced "I Wish", which had been previously leaked, was produced by Pappi J. The third single off the album is the remix to one of Waje's previous singles, "Na the Way" featuring J. Martins. The remix features a rap verse from Ghanaian rapper Sarkodie, along with production from J. Martins and him reprising his verse on the song. It was released on 23 April 2013, and coincided with the unveiling of the album's tracklist. The fourth single, "Onye", features fellow Nigerian singer Tiwa Savage. It was produced by Spellz, and its release coincided with its music video which was directed by Kemi Adetiba. The Cobhams Asuquo-produced fifth and final single "No Be You" was released on 2 October 2014 alongside its accompanying music video directed by Film Boy.

== Critical reception ==
Professional ratings
Review scores
Source	Rating
tooXclusive	3.5/5 stars
Nigerian Entertainment Today	4/5 stars

W.A.J.E received positive reception from music critics. Ayomide Tayo of The NET described the album as "a musical tour de force boasting of a strong voice and amazing songs", praising its lyrics, production, and concepts. Rating it a 4/5, he added that "if all debut albums sound as good as Waje's then no one would mind waiting six years". Wilfred Okiche of YNaija hailed W.A.J.E as "the year's best album. So far"; he concluded that "with this rich effort, Waje leaves her competition in the dust and inches steps closer".

Ogaga Sakpaide of tooXclusive called W.A.J.E a "revolutionary debut LP for her career worth every year of the wait", highlighting the songs "No Be You" as her "best vocal performance to date" and "Higher" for its uplifting and personal lyrics. Sakpaide awarded W.A.J.E 3.5/5 stars. Arinze Obikili, a writer for Jaguda, said that the album "will surely send fear shots to her competitors" despite "a few hiccups here and there". He concluded that "Waje has proven to herself and to others that even if she is not the Queen Of African Soul, she's pretty damn close to it", and rated the album 8/10.

=== Accolades ===
Awards and nominations for W.A.J.E
Organization	Year	Category	Result	Ref.
The Headies	2013	Hip Hop World Revelation of the Year (Waje for W.A.J.E)	Nominated	
World Music Awards	2014	Africa's World Best Album	Nominated	

== Track listing ==
W.A.J.E track listing
No.	Title	Writer(s)	Producer(s)	Length
1.	"Oko Mi"	Ayodele Basil	Del B	4:23
2.	"Onye" (featuring Tiwa Savage)	Aituaje Iruobe; Tiwatope Savage	Spellz	3:22
3.	"Ijeoma"	Iruobe	E Kelly	4:02
4.	"Fine Girl"	Iruobe; Makan King	Sizzle Pro	3:20
5.	"Grind" (featuring Burna Boy)	Iruobe; Damini Ogulu	LeriQ	3:56
6.	"Time Na Money"	King	Sizzle Pro	4:18
7.	"I Wish"	Iruobe	Pappi J	3:35
8.	"No Be You"	Iruobe; Cobhams Asuquo	Asuquo	5:01
9.	"Higher"	Iruobe; Asuquo	Asuquo	4:20
10.	"Only You" (featuring M.I Abaga)	Iruobe	M.I	3:47
11.	"Black and White" (featuring Eva and Phyno)	Iruobe; Eva Alordiah; Chibuzor Azubuike	E Kelly	4:25
12.	"Na the Way" (remix; featuring Sarkodie and J. Martins)	Iruobe; Michael Addo; Martins Justice	J. Martins	3:39
13.	"No Tomorrow"	Iruobe; Asuquo	Asuquo	3:53
14.	"One More Time"	Iruobe; King	Sizzle Pro	4:09
Total length:				56:10

== Release history ==
Release history and formats for W.A.J.E
Region	Date	Format	Label
Various	1 May 2013	CD; digital download	Waje Musik Entertainment
