= Waje =

Nigerian singer (born 1981)

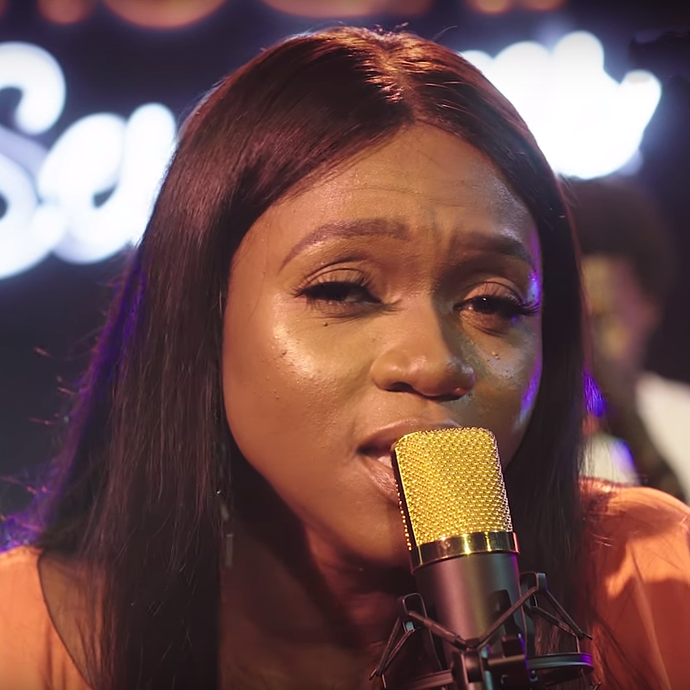
- Waje on Ndani TV, 2018

Background information
- Born: Aituaje Aina Vivian Ebele Iruobe; 1 September 1981 (age 45)
- Origin: Edo, Nigeria
- Genres: Pop; R&B; soul; blues; rock
- Occupations: Singer; songwriter
- Instrument: Vocals
- Years active: 2007 present

Aituaje Aina Vivian Ebele Iruobe (born 1 September 1981), known professionally as Waje (an acronym for "Words Aren't Just Enough"), is a Nigerian singer. She first gained recognition after being featured on the remake of P-Square's "Omoge Mi". Waje was also featured on the duo's 2008 hit track "Do Me". She contributed vocals to Banky W's "Thief My Kele" and M.I's "One Naira". In 2016, Waje was one of the four judges in the inaugural season of The Voice Nigeria. In 2018, she appeared on the final season of the Africa Magic telenovela Battleground.

== Early life and education ==
Waje was born on 1 September 1981, in Akure, Ondo State, Nigeria. She is the firstborn in her family. She grew up in Benin City, following her parents' relocation. Her parents got divorced when she was young, and she had to overcome the difficulty that accompanied her parents' separation.

Waje got pregnant when she was writing her final year secondary certificate examinations. She did not tell her mother about the pregnancy until five months into the pregnancy. She was temporarily banned from singing in the choir of her church for being pregnant outside of marriage.

She sang gospel tunes to the delight of the late Archbishop Benson Idahosa, who helped her during her entire secondary school days. Waje later moved to Nsukka to attend the University of Nigeria, Nsukka, earning a degree in Social Work. She listened to singers such as Whitney Houston and Aretha Franklin to improve her craft.

== Career ==
=== 2007–14: Musical releases and collaborations ===
Waje's vocal range covers three octaves. She was found singing in church. She studied social work at the University of Nigeria, Nsukka (UNN) and worked part-time in tourism. In 2007, Waje launched her music career. She was still a student at the time, and she did many free shows and gigs.

In 2008, she featured in the P-Square hit track titled "Do Me". This track was widely known across Africa and some parts of Europe. She participated in Advanced Warning, a reality TV show that featured artists on the verge of breakthroughs. The reality show was organised by MTV Base South Africa and Zain Nigeria, where she was the runner-up. In 2010, 360nobs.com, then a premium music web site in Nigeria did a special spotlight on Waje titled "Words Aren’t Just Enough...I'm Speechless."

On 30 March 2010, Waje released the single "So Inspired", produced by E-Kelly. It is written from the perspective of a woman suffering from domestic violence, who despite the circumstances, rises above the trauma. The aim of the song according to Waje is "to inspire young people, females especially to continuously aspire for greatness regardless of the drawbacks in their environment and life in general".

Waje has shared the stage with artists such as Wyclef Jean in South Africa, opening for Keri Hilson during a show organised in Calabar, and has also worked with artists who had hit singles, including "One Naira" with M.I and "Do Me" with P-Square. She collaborated with Dencia on "True Love" and has songs that have received awards and nominations. She released her self-titled debut studio album, Words Aren't Just Enough, in 2013.

Waje made her acting debut in the 2014 film Tunnel, alongside Femi Jacobs, Patrick Doyle, Nse Ikpe-Etim and Lepacious Bose. Directed by Stanlee Ohikhuare, the film is centred around a young pastor's life.

In November 2014, she released the music video for the Diamond Platnumz-assisted "Coco Baby". In August 2015, she released the single "Left for Good", featuring Patoranking and Godwin Strings. Waje was featured on "Strong Girl", the theme song for One's Poverty is Sexist campaign, and also joined Bono for the Lagos campaign in 2015. Waje was announced as one of the judges on The Voice Nigeria, alongside other Nigerian musicians, including 2face Idibia, Timi Dakolo and Patoranking.

=== 2019–21: Hermanes Media and She Is ===
In January 2019, Waje and Omawumi launched Hermanes Media, a media company that specializes in film and TV production, advertising, content curation, brand event activation, and creative digital marketing.

In March 2019, Waje revealed her intentions to quit music professionally. She said she was considering quitting because of the lack of support for her music.

In April 2019, Waje was featured in the Somkele Idhalama-produced movie She Is. She worked with Omawumi to record the movie's soundtrack.

In December 2019, she teamed up with another Nigerian rap artist, Zoro, to release a single titled "Ngwa". The song is a ballad-styled song produced by Philkeyz. The lyrics of the song are in Igbo. This song followed her earlier single called "Udue" where she featured Johnny Drille, an artist from Mavin Records.

=== 2022–present: Waje 2.0 ===
In 2022, she released her album titled Waje 2.0, which is an 11-track album that has features from Tiwa Savage, Imi Lawz, Falz, Emmyblaq and Masterkraft.

== Personal life ==
Waje is a single mother.

Her sister, Amaka Iruobe, is an actress who has had roles in the popular soap opera Tinsel and the movie First Cut.

Waje worked with the youths of her community through an organization called "Waje's Safe House", where she teams up with other NGOs quarterly to help fight for their cause. The first project supported under Waje's Safe House was the Mental and Environmental Development Initiative for Children, assisting Project HELP (Help Educate the Less Privileged), with the goal of raising funds to allow children to continue their studies in the school in Makoko, through Ring Back Tones' singles "Oko Mi" and "I Wish".

She was among Nigerian entertainers who collaborated with the Independent National Electoral Commission (INEC) to stand against electoral manipulation, vote-buying, violence, and thuggery.

== Discography ==
=== Studio albums ===
- W.A.J.E (2013)
- Red Velvet (2018)
- Heart Season (EP) (2021)
- WAJE 2.0 (2022)
- Unbroken (2022)
- The Misfit (2022)

=== Singles ===
- "For A Minute" (2010)
- "So Inspired" (2010)
- "Na The Way" (2011)

== Awards and nominations ==
=== Nominations ===
- Nigerian Music Video Awards 2009 (Best New Video)
- Dynamix Awards 2009 (Best New Act)
- Hip Hop World Awards (The Headies) 2010 (Best Vocals)
- City People Awards 2011(Best R&B Female)
- Nigerian Entertainment Awards 2011 (Best Pop/R&B Artist Of The Year. Best New Act Of The Year)
- The Headies 2011 (Best Vocal Performer Female, Best R&B Single)
- Exquisite Ladies Of The Year 2011 (Female Music Act of the Year)
- Channel O Music Video Awards 2011 (Most Gifted Female Video)
- Nigerian Music Video Awards 2011 (Best Contemporary Afro Video)
- Deafa Afro-Europe Entertainment Awards 2011 (Best African Art)
- Best Recording Of The Year 2013 ("I Wish", W.A.J.E Album)
- Best Reggae/Dance Hall 2013 ("I Wish", W.A.J.E Album)
- Best Vocal Performance Female 2013 ("I Wish", W.A.J.E Album)
- Black Canadian Awards 2014 (Best International Act)
- World Music Awards 2014 (World Best Album) W.A.J.E
- World Music Awards 2014 (World Best Live Act)
- World Music Awards 2014 (World Best Female Entertainer)
- World Music Awards 2014 (World Best Entertainer)
- ELOY Awards 2014 (Best Female Artist)

== See also ==
- List of Nigerian musicians
