= Tokyo Toni's Finding Love ASAP! =

Reality television show

- Genre: Reality
- Starring: Tokyo Toni
- Country of origin: United States
- Original language: English
- No. of seasons: 1
- No. of episodes: 7

Production
- Executive producers: Lemuel Plummer; Jason L. Tolbert; Tokyo Toni; Blac Chyna; LJ Plummer; Jason Thomas Scott; Janeisha John; Tameka Stevenson; Jeffrey Elmont
- Running time: 40 minutes

Original release
- Network: Zeus Network
- Release: November 10 – December 29, 2019

Tokyo Toni's Finding Love ASAP! is a reality television dating game show series starring Tokyo Toni, the mother of Blac Chyna. It premiered on November 10, 2019, on Zeus Network.

== Development ==
After a controversial appearance on The Real Blac Chyna, it was announced that Tokyo Toni would star in her own show on Zeus Network.

== Series synopsis ==
=== Overview and casting ===
Tokyo Toni's Finding Love ASAP! is an unscripted dating show which chronicles Tokyo Toni's search for a man.

In addition to the show's fifteen contestants, Love & Hip Hop: Hollywood's Lyrica Garrett appears as Toni's friend and confidante, while Toni's daughter Blac Chyna makes guest appearances in two episodes.

=== Contestants ===
Contestant	Real Name	Outcome
Big D	Theodore Mark Martinez	Winner
#14823	Corey Neal	Runner-up
Papeye	Nairobi Evans	3rd Place
Mr. Salsa	Gabriel Alderete	4th Place
Kookie Monster	—N/a	5th Place
Romey Rome	Mark	6th Place
Big Nigga	Anthony Lee Dalton	7th Place
No Name	Jared	8th Place
Good Credit	Bob	9th Place
Cotton	Robby Christie	10th Place
Lil D	Theodore Mark Martinez Jr.	11th Place
F.O.S.	Demetrius Anthony Lykes	12th Place
Rainbow	Devi Deauville	13th–14th Place
Tweedy Byrd	Jaysan	13th–14th Place
Weirdo	—N/a	15th Place

=== Call-out order ===
Order	Episode					
Order	1–2	3	4	5	6	7
1	Kookie Monster	Romey Rome	Big Nigga	Big D		Big D
2	Good Credit	No Name	Mr. Salsa	Romey Rome	#14823	#14823
3	Big D	Big Nigga	Romey Rome	#14823	Papeye	Papeye
4	Big Nigga	Good Credit	Papeye	Kookie Monster	Mr. Salsa	—N/a
5	Mr. Salsa	Kookie Monster	#14823	Mr. Salsa	Kookie Monster	—N/a
6	No Name	Papeye	Big D	Papeye	Romey Rome	—N/a
7	Cotton	Mr. Salsa	No Name	Big Nigga	—N/a	
8	Romey Rome	#14823	Kookie Monster	No Name	—N/a	
9	Lil D	Big D	Good Credit	—N/a		
10	Papeye	Cotton	—N/a			
11	#14823	Lil D	—N/a			
12	F.O.S.	—N/a				
13	Rainbow	—N/a				
14	Tweedy Byrd	—N/a				
15	Weirdo	—N/a				

Color key
Winner
Runner-up
3rd place
Bottom 2
Eliminated
Quit

== Episodes ==
No.	Title	Original release date
1	"Who Are You Here For? – Part 1"	November 10, 2019
2	"Who Are You Here For? – Part 2"	November 17, 2019
3	"Let Me Spell It Out for You"	November 24, 2019
4	"Pole Position"	December 8, 2019
5	"Pass It to the Left"	December 15, 2019
6	"Who's Your Daddy?"	December 22, 2019
7	"The Table is Set"	December 29, 2019
