= List of awards and nominations received by Jed Madela =

Jed Madela awards and nominations
Awards and nominations
Award	Wins	Nominations
Voice of Asia	4	
World Championships of Performing Arts	12	
Myx Music Awards		1
Aliw Awards	7	2
Awit Awards	3	3
PMPC Star Awards for Music	6	14
ASAP Pop Viewers Choice	1	1
GMMSF Box-Office Entertainment Awards	2	
Wish 107.5 Awards		2
Gawad Musika Awards	1	

Totals (Note: Certain award groups do not simply award one winner. They acknowledge several different recipients, have runners-up, and have third place. Since this is a specific recognition and is different from losing an award, runner-up mentions are considered wins in this award tally. For simplification and to avoid errors, each award in this list has been presumed to have had a prior nomination.)
- Wins: 27
- Nominations: 25

This is a list of awards and nominations Jed Madela has received during his career.

== Awards ==
=== Voice of Asia ===
Year	Nominee / work	Award	Result
2003	Himself	Best Voice of Asia Male Singer of the Year 2003	Won
2003	Himself	People's Choice Award	Won
2003	Himself	Sponsor's Choice	Won

Year	Award	Media
2003	Silver Trophy	I'll Be Around Labis Akong Umibig Be My Lady

=== World Championships of Performing Arts ===
Year	Award
2005	2005 Grand World Champion for the Performing Arts
2005	Overall Vocals World Champion
2005	Overall Male Vocals World Champion
2005	Overall Duet-Group Vocals World Champion
2013	2013 Achievement Award
2013	Performing Arts Hall of Fame

Year	Award	Media
2005	Gold Medal, Pop-Male	I Don't Wanna Miss a Thing
2005	Gold Medal, Broadway-Male	Home
2005	Gold Medal, Original Song-Male	Be My Lady
2005	Gold Medal, Gospel-Male	Take Me Out of the Dark
2005	Gold Medal, Pop-Duet	You're My Angel duet with Rizza Navales
2005	Gold Medal, Broadway-Duet	Last Night of the World (Miss Saigon) duet with Rizza Navales

=== Myx Music Awards ===
Year	Nominee / work	Award	Result
2008	Jed Madela	Favorite MYX Live Performance	Nominated
2018	Jed Madela and Darren Espanto	Collaboration of the Year	Nominated
2018	I’ll Be There by Jed Madela and Darren Espanto	Remake of the Year	Won

=== Aliw Awards ===
(Philippines equivalent to People's Choice Award)

Year	Nominee / work	Award	Result
2008	Himself	Hall of Fame	Won
2010	Himself	Best Performance in a Concert (Male)	Nominated
2011	Christmas at the Newport Performing Arts Theater	Best Major Concert (Male)	Won
2012	Beyond Expectations/CCP	Best Major Concert (Male)	Won
2012	Back to Basics/Music Museum	Best Performance in a Concert (Male)	Nominated
2014	Himself	Entertainer of the Year	Won
2014	Himself (10th Anniversary Concert)	Best Major Concert	Won
2014	Himself (All Requests 2)	Best Performance in a Concert (Male)	Won
2016	Himself (The Iconic Concert Series: Jed Madela Sings Celine/ Music Museum)	Best Performance in a Concert (Male)	Won

=== Awit Awards ===
The Philippine Awit Awards - About the Awit Awards (Philippines equivalent to Grammy Award)

Year	Nominee / work	Award	Result
2008	Hard Habit to Break featuring Gary Valenciano	Best Performance by a Duet	Won
2008	A Perfect Christmas	Best Christmas	Won
2010	Songs Rediscovered 2: The Ultimate OPM Playlist	Best Selling Album of the Year	Nominated
2016	Iconic: Didn't We Almost Have It All	Best Performance by a Male Recording Artist	Nominated
2016	Iconic: Sweet Love	Best Vocal Arrangement	Nominated
2016	Iconic: Somewhere Over The Rainbow duet with Ms. Regine Velasquez- Alcasid	Best Collaboration	Nominated
2017	MMK 25 - Commemorative Album	Best Collaboration (with Darren Espanto)	Won

=== Guillermo Mendoza Memorial Scholarship Foundation Box-Office Entertainment Awards ===
Year	Nominee / work	Award	Result
2016	Himself	Male Recording Artist of the Year	Won
2016	Your Face Sounds Familiar (ABS-CBN)	Most Popular TV Program Talent Search/Reality/Talk/Game Program	Won

=== Wish 107.5 Awards ===
Year	Nominee / work	Award	Result
2016	Himself	Wish Male Artist of the Year	Nominated
2016	Iconic: You Mean The World To Me	Best WISHclusive Performance By A Male Artist	Nominated

=== PMPC Star Awards for Music ===
Year	Nominee / work	Award	Result
2009	Songs Rediscovered 2: The Ultimate OPM Playlist	Male Recording Artist	Nominated
2009	Songs Rediscovered 2: The Ultimate OPM Playlist	Male Pop Artist of the Year	Won
2009	Songs Rediscovered 2: The Ultimate OPM Playlist	Revival Album of the Year	Nominated
2011	The Classics Album	Male Recording Artist	Won
2011	I Believe	Music Video of the Year	Nominated
2011	The Classics Album	Male Pop Artist of the Year	Nominated
2011	The Classics Album	Revival Album of the Year	Won
2011	The Classics Album	Album Cover Design of the Year	Nominated
2012	Breathe Again	Album of the Year	Nominated
2012	Breathe Again	Song of the Year	Nominated
2012	Breathe Again	Male Recording Artist of the Year	Won
2012	Breathe Again	Male Pop Artist of the Year	Nominated
2012	Breathe Again	Revival Album of the Year	Nominated
2012	Breathe Again	Album Cover Design of the Year	Nominated
2013	All Originals	Male Recording Artist of the Year	Won
2016	Iconic	Male Recording Artist of the Year	Won
2016	Iconic	Revival Album of the Year	Nominated
2016	Iconic	Design Cover of the Year	Nominated
2016	All Requests 5	Concert of the Year	Nominated
2016	All Requests 5	Male Concert Performer of the Year	Nominated
2018	All About Love	Concert of the Year	Nominated
2018	All About Love	Male Concert Performer of the Year	Won
2019	Di Matitinag	Male Recording Artist of the Year	Won
2019	Superhero	Album of the Year	Nominated
2019	Higher Than High	Concert of the Year	Nominated
2019	Higher Than High	Male Concert Performer of the year	Nominated
2024	Here & Now: The 20th Anniversary Concert	Concert of the Year	Nominated
2024	Here & Now: The 20th Anniversary Concert	Male Concert Performer of the Year	Won

=== Himig Handog ===
Year	Nominee / work	Award	Result
2014	If You Don't Want to Fall	Studio Readers Award	Won
2014	If You Don't Want to Fall	TFC's Choice Award	Won

=== Gawad Musika Award ===
Year	Nominee / work	Award	Result
2017	Himself	Most Innovative Vocal Performing and Recording Artist	Won

=== Laguna Excellence Award ===
Year	Nominee / work	Award	Result
2018	Himself	Outstanding Male Artist of the Year	Won

=== Catholic Mass Media Awards ===
Year	Nominee / work	Award	Result
2019	Superhero	Best Album Secular Album	Won
