= Mỹ Tâm discography =

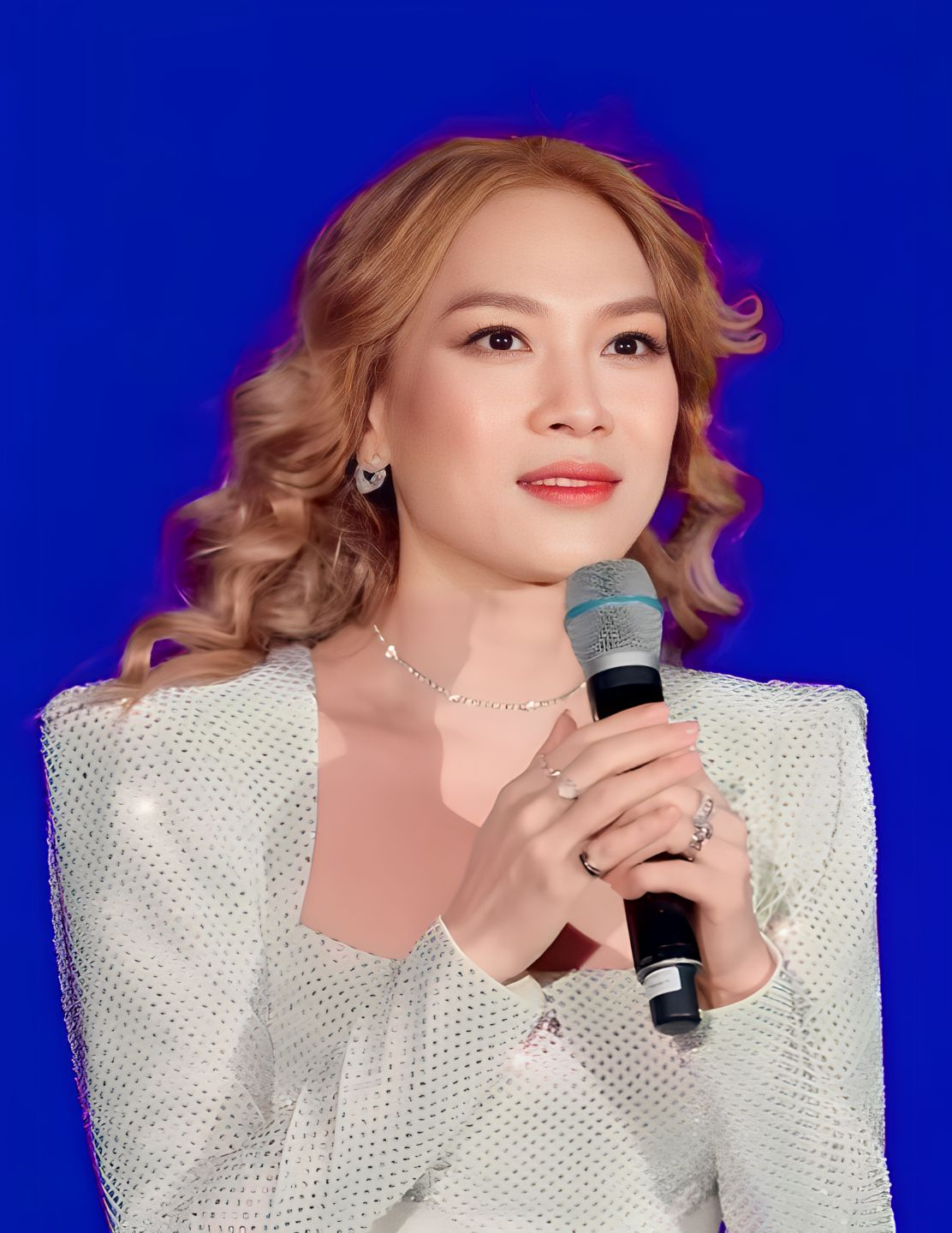
- Studio albums: 9
- Extended plays: 3 (CD), 2 (VCD)
- Compilation albums: 1

The following is a list of recordings by Vietnamese pop-singer Mỹ Tâm.

== Studio albums ==
Title	Album details	Peak chart positions	Sales
Title	Album details	US World	Sales
Mãi Yêu	Released: May 22, 2001; Label: Phương Nam Film; Formats: CD, digital download, streaming	—	Vietnam: 54,000 (physical)
Đâu Chỉ Riêng Em	Released: December 17, 2002; Label: Phương Nam Film, MT Entertainment; Formats: CD, digital download, streaming	—	
Yesterday & Now	Released: June 17, 2003; Label: Bến Thành Audio & Video, MT Entertainment; Formats: CD, digital download, streaming	—	Vietnam: 100,000 (physical)
Hoàng Hôn Thức Giấc	Released: April 24, 2005; Label: Bến Thành Audio & Video, MT Entertainment; Formats: CD, digital download, streaming	—	Vietnam: 20.000 (physical first week)
Vút Bay	Released: December 21, 2006; Label: Bến Thành Audio & Video, MT Entertainment; Formats: CD, digital download, streaming	—	Vietnam: 15.000 (physical first week)
Trở Lại	Released: April 4, 2008; Label: MT Entertainment; Formats: CD, digital download, streaming	—	
To the Beat	Released: September 1, 2008; Label: MT Entertainment; Formats: CD, digital download, streaming	—	
Tâm	Released: March 24, 2013; Label: MT Entertainment; Formats: CD, digital download, streaming	—	Vietnam: 6,000 (physical first day)
Tâm 9	Released: December 3, 2017; Label: MT Entertainment; Formats: CD, LP, digital download, streaming	10	Vietnam: 25,000 (physical); Worldwide: 50,000
"—" denotes releases that did not chart or were not released in that region.

=== Compilation albums ===
==== Những Giai Điệu Thời Gian (Melodies of Time) (2010) ====
This album contains the following tracks:

1. "Chuyện Tình Không Suy Tư" (Thoughtless Love)
2. "Xin Thời Gian Qua Mau" (Please Time, Go Quick)
3. "Bản Tình Cuối" (The Last LoveSong)
4. "Những Bước Chân Âm Thầm" (Silent Footsteps)
5. "Đợi Yêu" (Wait for Love)
6. "Sao Em Còn Buồn" (Why Are You Still Sad?)
7. "Em Đã Thấy Mùa Xuân Chưa" (Have You Seen The Spring Yet?)
8. "Đoản Khúc Cuối Cho Em" (Your Last Perish Song)
9. "Chuyện Hợp Tan" (Loving and Heartbreak)
10. "Có Một Dòng Sông Đã Qua Đời" (Forgotten River)

==== Những Giai Điệu Thời Gian 2: Quê Hương Đất Nước (Melodies of Time Pt.2: Motherland) (2010) ====
This album contains the following tracks:

1. "Làng Tôi" (The Village)
2. "Bèo Dạt Mây Trôi" (Water-Ferns Drifting, Clouds Floating) Note: This is an idiom for uncertainty.
3. "Câu Hò Bên Bờ Hiền Lương" (The Hien Luong River Song) (Note: Hien Luong River represents the boundary between North and South.)
4. "Em Vẫn Đợi Anh Về" (I Still Wait for You)
5. "Thành Phố Tình Yêu và Nỗi Nhớ" (City of Love and Memories) (Note: The city referred to is Haiphong.)
6. "Em Còn Nhớ Hay Em Đã Quên" (Do You Still Remember Me, or Have You Forgotten?)
7. "Tạm Biệt Chim Én" (Goodbye, Swallow)
8. "Quê Hương Tuổi Thơ Tôi" (My Childhood Hometown)
9. "Nhớ Về Hà Nội" (Old Hanoi)
10. "Đâu Phải Bởi Mùa Thu" (It's Not Because It's Autumn)

== Singles ==
A list of My Tam's notable single releases.

=== Audio Singles and EPs ===
My Tam released these singles and extended plays on CD and other formats:

- "Thoát ly" (Outbreak) (2001)
- "Cây đàn sinh viên" (The Guitar of Students) (March 2002) including title track, "Quê hương tuổi thơ tôi" (Hometown - My Childhood) and "Tiếng lòng xao động" (Love awakes)
- "Ban mai tình yêu" (Dawn of Love) (May 2002) including title track, "Tình lỡ cách xa" (Love leaves by mistake) and "Vấn vương" (Longing)
- "Dấu chấm hỏi" (?) (2002)
- "Hát với dòng sông" (Serenading with the River) (2002)
- "Giai điệu tình yêu: Tiếng hát Mỹ Tâm" (Love Melody - My Tam) (2003) including various tracks such as "Đôi cánh tình yêu" (Wings of Love) and "Hãy tha thứ cho em" (Please Forgive Me -cover "the queen of heart-ABBA)
- Cho một tình yêu - EP (For Love - EP) (2011) - including different versions of the title track

=== Video Singles ===
My Tam released these video singles and extended plays on VCD and other formats:

- "Hát Với Dòng Sông" (Sing with the River) (May 2002) - includes title track, "The Student Guitar" and "My Childhood Hometown" ( VCD )
- Mãi Yêu (Endless Love) (after 2003) - includes "Xích Lô" (Pedicab) ( VCD )

=== 1990s ===
Title	Year	Album	Ref
"Nhé Anh"	1999	Mãi Yêu, Vol. 1	

=== 2000s ===
Title	Year	Album	Ref
"Mãi Yêu"	2000	Mãi Yêu, Vol. 1	
"Tóc Nâu Môi Trầm"	2001	Mãi Yêu, Vol. 1	
"Nhé Anh" (Re-release)	2001	Mãi Yêu, Vol. 1	
"Tình Mãi Xanh"	2001	Non-album single	
"Hai Mươi"	2002	Mãi Yêu, Vol. 1	
"Cây Đàn Sinh Viên"	2002	Cây Đàn Sinh Viên	
"Quê Hương Tuổi Thơ Tôi"	2002	Cây Đàn Sinh Viên	
"Giấc Mơ Tình Yêu (Love Dream)"	2002	Đâu Chỉ Riêng Em, Vol. 2	
"Tình Xót Xa Thôi (A Lament for Lost Love)"	2002	Đâu Chỉ Riêng Em, Vol. 2	
"Chiếc Nhẫn Cỏ (The Grass Ring)"	2003	Đâu Chỉ Riêng Em, Vol. 2	
"Một Lần Và Mãi Mãi"	2003	Đâu Chỉ Riêng Em, Vol. 2	
"Ước Gì (I Wish)"	2003	Yesterday & Now, Vol. 3	
"Họa Mi Tóc Nâu"	2003	Yesterday & Now, Vol. 3	
"Tình Em Ngọn Nến"	2003	Non-album single	
"Xích Lô (Cyclo)"	2003	Non-album single	
"Em Chờ Anh (Waiting for You)"	2006	Vút Bay, Vol. 5	
"Giọt Sương (The Dewdrop)"	2006	Vút Bay, Vol. 5	
"Bí Mật (Secret)"	2006	Vút Bay, Vol. 5	
"Hãy Đến Với Em (I Know You Know)"	2006	Vút Bay, Vol. 5	
"Như Em Đợi Anh"	2008	Trở Lại, Vol. 6	

=== 2010s ===
Title	Year	Album	Ref
"Cho Một Tình Yêu"	2010	OST Cho Một Tình Yêu	
"Đánh Thức Bình Minh (Breaking the Dawn)"	2011	Non-album single	
"Xin Lỗi (Apologize)"	2011	OST Cho Một Tình Yêu	
"Tôi Và Tuổi Thơ (My Childhood)"	2011	OST Cho Một Tình Yêu	
"Nỡ Quên (Forgotten)"	2011	OST Cho Một Tình Yêu	
"Xin Chào Ngày Mới (Hello New Day)" (feat. Tuấn Hưng)	2011	OST Cho Một Tình Yêu	
"Nắng Xuân Ngời (The Sigh)"	2011	OST Cho Một Tình Yêu	
"Một Chuyện Tình (Love Story)" (feat. Tuấn Hưng)	2011	OST Cho Một Tình Yêu	
"Sai (Wrong)"	2012	Non-album single	
"Chuyện Như Chưa Bắt Đầu (Pretend We Had No Start)"	2012	Non-album single	
"Trắng Đen (Black & White)"	2012	Non-album single	
"Sự Thật Ta Yêu Nhau (The Truth)"	2013	Tâm, Vol. 8	
"Vì Em Quá Yêu Anh (Crazy Love)"	2013	Tâm, Vol. 8	
"Như Một Giấc Mơ (Like A Dream)	2013	Tâm, Vol. 8	
"Em Phải Làm Sao (What Could I Do)"	2013	Non-album single	
"Gửi Tình Yêu Của Em" (Letter To My Love)"	2013	Tâm, Vol. 8	
"Không Yêu Không Yêu (Blah Blah Blah)"	2013	Non-album single	
"Thương Ca Tiếng Việt"	2014	Non-album single	
"Vì Mình Còn Yêu"	2014	Non-album single	
"Đêm Mùa Đông" (feat. Thu Thủy)	2015	Non-album single	
"Khi Cô Đơn Em Gọi Tên Anh"	2015	Non-album single	
"Thứ Tha"	2015	Non-album single	
"Đôi Mắt Màu Xanh (Blue Eyes)"	2016	Non-album single	
"Hãy Về Với Nhau"	2016	Non-album single	
"Cuộc Tình Không May"	2016	Non-album single	
"Em Thì Không" (feat. Karik)	2017	Non-album single	
"Đâu Chỉ Riêng Em"	2017	Tâm 9	
"Đừng Hỏi Em (Don't Ask Me)"	2017	Tâm 9	
"Người Hãy Quên Em Đi (Please Forget Me)"	2018	Tâm 9	
"Anh Chưa Từng Biết (You Never Know)"	2018	Tâm 9	
"Muộn Màng Là Từ Lúc (Late From The Beginning)"	2018	Tâm 9	
"Nơi Mình Dừng Chân"	2019	OST Chị Trợ Lý Của Anh	
"Nếu Anh Đi"	2019	Tâm 9	
"Con Gái Như Em" (feat. Binz)	2019	OST Chị Trợ Lý Của Anh	
"Rất Vui Được Gặp Nhau" (feat. Hà Anh Tuấn)	2019	OST Chị Trợ Lý Của Anh	
"Anh Đợi Em Được Không (Would You Wait For Me)"	2019	Non-album single	

=== 2020s ===
Title	Year	Peak chart positions		Album	Ref
Title	Year	VN Hot 100	VN Top Vietnamese	Album	Ref
"Đúng Cũng Thành Sai"	2020	—N/a	—N/a	Non-album single	
"Anh Chưa Biết Đâu"	2020	—N/a	—N/a	Non-album single	
"Hào Quang"	2021	—N/a	—N/a	Non-album single	
"Cuộc Hẹn Trong Mơ"	2021	—N/a	—N/a	Non-album single	
"Mong Manh Tình Về (Live)"	2022	—	—	Non-album single	
"Sự Thật Ta Yêu Nhau (Live)" (feat. Phan Mạnh Quỳnh)	2022	—	—	Non-album single	
"Ngày Chưa Giông Bão (Live)"	2022	—	—	Non-album single	
"Hẹn Ước Từ Hư Vô (Live)"	2022	7	7	Non-album single	
"Nước Ngoài (Live)"	2022	—	—	Non-album single	
"Tay Vớt Ánh Trăng (Live)"	2022	—	—	Non-album single	
"Bước Qua Nhau (Live)" (feat. VŨ.)	2022	—	—	Non-album single	
"Cũng Đành Thôi (Live)"	2022	—	—	Non-album single	
"Chuyện Rằng (Live)" (feat. Thịnh Suy)	2022	—	—	Non-album single	
"Anh Đợi Em Được Không (Live)"	2022	—	—	Non-album single	
"Khi Giấc Mơ Về (Live)"	2022	—	—	Non-album single	
"Ngọn Đồi Hoa Bay (Live)"	2022	—	—	Non-album single	
"Đâu Chỉ Riêng Em (Live)"	2022	—	—	Non-album single	
"Anh, Thế Giới Và Em (Live)"	2023	—	—	Non-album single	
"Có Một Nơi Như Thế (Live)" (feat. Phan Mạnh Quỳnh)	2023	—	—	Non-album single	
"Chuyện Hiển Nhiên (Live)"	2023	—	—	Non-album single	
"Một Đêm Say (Live)"	2023	—	—	Non-album single	
"Hơn Cả Yêu (Live)" (feat. Khắc Hưng)	2023	—	—	Non-album single	
"Từ Đó (Live)"	2023	—	—	Non-album single	
"Có Quên Được Đâu (Live)"	2023	—	—	Non-album single	
"Tri Kỷ (Live)" (feat. Phan Mạnh Quỳnh)	2023	—	—	Non-album single	
"Thắc Mắc (Live)" (feat. Thịnh Suyh)	2023	—	—	Non-album single	
"Khi Người Mình Yêu Khóc (Live)"	2023	—	—	Non-album single	
"Cuộc Tình Không May (Live)" (feat. VŨ.)	2023	—	—	Non-album single	
"Khi Ta Yêu (Live)"	2023	—	—	Non-album single	
"Kathy Kathy (Live)"	2023	—	—	Non-album single	
"Có Đôi Lần (Live)" (feat. Đức Phúc)	2023	—	—	Non-album single	
"Nhạt (Live)"	2023	—	—	Non-album single	
"Ai Khóc Nỗi Đau Này (Live)"	2023	—	—	Non-album single	
"Ta Chẳng Còn Ai (Live)"	2023	—	—	Non-album single	
"Nụ Hôn Bất Ngờ (Live)"	2023	—	—	Non-album single	
"Anh Chưa Từng Biết (Live)"	2023	—	—	Non-album single	
"Vì Em Tất Cả"	2023	28	22	Non-album single	

=== Promotional single ===
Title	Year	Peak chart positions		Album	Ref
Title	Year	VN Hot 100	VN Top Vietnamese	Album	Ref
"Ban Mai Tình Yêu"	2002	—N/a	—N/a	Ban Mai Tình Yêu	
"Niềm Tin Chiến Thắng"	2003	—N/a	—N/a	Yesterday & Now, Vol. 3	
"Tình Yêu Chưa Nói (How Can I Say I Love You?)"	2006	—N/a	—N/a	Vút Bay, Vol. 5	
"Và Em Có Anh"	2008	—N/a	—N/a	Trở Lại, Vol. 6	
"Hơi Ấm Ngày Xưa"	2008	—N/a	—N/a	Trở Lại, Vol. 6	
"Mưa Và Nỗi Nhớ"	2008	—N/a	—N/a	Trở Lại, Vol. 6	
"Lại Một Đêm Mưa (Rainy Night)"	2013	—N/a	—N/a	Tâm, Vol. 8	
"Giữa Hai Chúng Ta (The Two of Us)"	2013	—N/a	—N/a	Tâm, Vol. 8	
"My Friend"	2013	—N/a	—N/a	Tâm, Vol. 8	
"Còn Lại (Hurt)"	2014	—N/a	—N/a	Tâm, Vol. 8	
"Nụ Cười Còn Mãi" (feat. Wanbi Tuấn Anh)	2014	—N/a	—N/a	Non-album promotional single	
"Điều Tuyệt Vời"	2017	—N/a	—N/a	Non-album promotional single	
"Một Vòng Tay, Ngàn Lời Yêu (Soul Of Music)"	2017	—N/a	—N/a	Non-album promotional single	
"Nếu Có Buông Tay (If You Let Go")	2017	—N/a	—N/a	Tâm 9	
"Rực Rỡ Tháng Năm"	2018	—N/a	—N/a	OST Rực Rỡ Tháng Năm	
"Người Hãy Quên Em Đi (이럴거였니) (Korean Version)"	2018	—N/a	—N/a	Non-album promotional single	
"Đời Là Giấc Mơ"	2019	—N/a	—N/a	OST Chị Trợ Lý Của Anh	
"Khi Ta Yêu"	2019	—N/a	—N/a	OST Chị Trợ Lý Của Anh	
"Biết Khi Nào Gặp Lại"	2019	—N/a	—N/a	Tâm 9	
"Vậy Cũng Vui"	2020	—N/a	—N/a	Non-album promotional single	
"Hương Vị Quê Hương"	2021	—N/a	—N/a	Non-album promotional single	
"Lạnh Lùng"	2021	—N/a	—N/a	Tâm 9	
"Yêu Thương Tiếp Nối"	2022	—	—	Non-album promotional single	
"Trên Tình Bạn Dưới Tình Yêu (Live)" (feat. Thịnh Suy)	2022	—	—	Non-album promotional single	
"Ngọt Ngào Ở Ngày Mai" (with Suboi)	2022	—	—	Non-album promotional single	
"Bước Qua Mùa Cô Đơn (Live)" (feat. Vũ.)	2022	—	—	Non-album promotional single	
"Nếu Như (Live)"	2022	—	—	Non-album promotional single	
"Love You To The Moon And Back (Live)" (feat. Cadillac)	2023	—	—	Non-album promotional single	
"Hẹn Ước Từ Hư Vô (Live)" (feat. Cadillac)	2023	—	—	Non-album promotional single	
"The Light"	2023	—	—	OST Người Giữ Thời Gian	
"Lạ Lùng (Live)" (feat. Vũ.)	2023	—	—	Non-album promotional single	
"Chuyện Buồn (Live)"	2023	—	—	Non-album promotional single	
