= Asia New Singer Competition =

Chinese singing competition

The 11th Asia New Singer Competition logo, as shown on the channel YNTV

Asia New Singer Competition (simplified Chinese: 亚洲新人歌手大赛; traditional Chinese: 亞洲新人歌手大賽) is a singing competition established by Shanghai Cultural Development Foundation in Shanghai, China, featuring younger and relatively unestablished contestants from many Asian countries, although contestants from Europe and Oceania have also participated and won awards. Some participants like Siti Nurhaliza, Misha Omar and Jaclyn Victor from Malaysia and My Tam from Vietnam would go on to become superstars in their countries. Shila Amzah later rose to fame in Asia after signing a record deal in Shanghai China.

It is usually held with the Shanghai Music Festival, although recent editions have been held in Beijing and Penang, Malaysia.

== Summary ==
Year	Gold Award	Silver Award	Bronze Award
2010 (11th)	(Philippines) Lordenn Panganiban	(Sri Lanka) Umaria Sinhawansa (Bulgaria) Dessy Dobreva	(Thailand) Sarun Kungbunpot (Romania) Alina Eremia (Finland) Osmo Ikonen
2008 (10th)	(Malaysia) Shila Amzah	(Hong Kong) Victoria Chan (陳皓恩) (Philippines) Casper Blancaflor	(China) Lu Jian (陆坚) (Philippines) Cheenee Daria (Australia) Michael Montgomery
2006 (9th)	(Philippines) Maria Donna Taneo	(China) Alan Dawa Dolma (Philippines) Jimmy Layo Marquez	(Japan) Sista Five (Sri Lanka) Umaria Sinhawansa (Malta) Eleanor Cassar
2005 (8th)	(Malaysia) Jaclyn Victor		
2004 (7th)	(China) Wang Hao (王昊)	(Philippines) Rachelle Ann Go (Georgia (country)) Anri Jokhadze	(Singapore) Iskandar Ismail (Malaysia) Vince Chong (South Korea) Jung Seung-ah
2003 (6th)	(Malaysia) Misha Omar	(China) Jin Lin (金霖) (China) Erkin Abdulla	(China) Cao Huan (曹欢) (Mongolia) Naran (Kazakhstan) Marzhan Arapbaeva
2002 (5th)	(Malaysia) Sharifah Hadijah Moss		
2001 (4th)	(China) Wei Li (魏丽)	(Malaysia) Liza Hanim	
2000 (3rd)	(Azerbaijan) Manana Japaridze	(China) Sang Fangfei (桑芳菲) (Philippines) Tintin Arnaldo	(South Korea) Lee Hee (Vietnam) My Tam (Philippines) Mari Placencia
1999 (2nd)	(Malaysia) Siti Nurhaliza	(China) Zhang Xin (张芯) (Philippines) Carol Banawa	(Mongolia) Bat (Philippines) Jeffrey Hidalgo (Indonesia) Dea Mirella

Note: the "1st" competition in 1991 featured only Chinese singers and was simply called New Singer Competition (新人歌手大赛). Zhu Hong (朱虹) was the winner.

== See also ==
- Voice of Asia
- Asian Wave
- K-Pop Star Hunt
