= The Real Blac Chyna =

- Genre: Reality
- Starring: Blac Chyna
- Country of origin: United States
- Original language: English
- No. of seasons: 1
- No. of episodes: 13

Production
- Executive producers: Lemuel Plummer; Jason L. Tolbert; Blac Chyna; LJ Plummer; Jason Thomas Scott; Janeisha John; Tameka Stevenson; Jeffrey Elmont; Giovanni Wilson
- Running time: 40 minutes

Original release
- Network: Zeus Network
- Release: July 14 – October 6, 2019

The Real Blac Chyna is a reality television series starring Blac Chyna. It premiered on July 14, 2019, on Zeus Network. The show ended on October 6, 2019.

== Series synopsis ==
=== Overview and casting ===
The Real Blac Chyna chronicles the everyday life and struggles of entrepreneur Blac Chyna.

Several members of Chyna's inner circle appear as supporting cast members in confessional interview segments throughout the series. They include her best friend Treasure Gemz, her assistant Ashton Levi, her mother Tokyo Toni, her manager Jamaal Terrance and her hair stylist Alex Jairus. During the season, Treasure, Ashton and Jamaal are phased out of the series, after each having a falling out with Chyna.

On November 2, 2019, Chyna confirmed that a second season was in the works, though this never came to fruition.

== Development ==
In May 2019, Blac Chyna signed a deal with Zeus Network to star and produce her own docu-series. The show made headlines while filming when Chyna's ex-partner Rob Kardashian refused to allow their daughter Dream to appear on the show, and for the intense fight between Chyna and her mother Tokyo Toni in the show's premiere episode.

On September 1, 2019, Zeus released the first episode for free on YouTube, garnering over 6 million views. On October 8, 2019, Zeus released the second episode for free on YouTube, garnering over 6 million views. The show later began airing on January 7, 2021 on We TV.

== Episodes ==
No.	Title	Original release date
1	"Blac Chyna Faces Tokyo Toni"	July 14, 2019
Blac Chyna's life in Los Angeles is disrupted when her mother Tokyo Toni comes to town. guest stars: Wasi (Tokyo Toni's security)
2	"Not Exactly a Walk in the Park"	July 21, 2019
After Chyna and Toni's violent reunion, Treasure and Ashton reach out to Toni to try and resolve things. Their meeting in a public park goes left when Treasure's own issues with Toni resurface. guest stars: Wasi (Tokyo Toni's security)
3	"Guess Who's Coming to Dinner"	July 28, 2019
Ashton convinces Chyna and Toni to sit down for dinner. guest stars: Benji (artist, family friend)
4	"Back to Basics"	August 4, 2019
Chyna meets up with her friend Dencia to discuss their controversial skin bleaching venture, and later goes into the studio with Mally Mall to work on her music debut. Chyna talks with Dencia about the media brouhaha over her Harvard online college courses. guest stars: Dencia (Blac Chyna's friend), Mally Mall (record producer, rapper), Phreshy (Blac Chyna's publicist), Jeremih (singer, music producer)
5	"If You Can Make It There"	August 11, 2019
Chyna flies to New York to appear on The Wendy Williams Show, where disagreements between her and her team get out of hand. guest stars: Phreshy (Blac Chyna's publicist)
6	"In a New York Minute"	August 18, 2019
The drama continues on the day of Chyna's appearance on The Wendy Williams Show. guest stars: Phreshy (Blac Chyna's publicist)
7	"Can't Skate by on this One"	August 25, 2019
Chyna goes to Atlanta to film an episode of Wild 'n Out and to host a skate party, where she is again comes face to face with Toni. guest stars: Lira Galore, Phreshy, Wasi
8	"That Shrinking Feeling – Part 1"	September 1, 2019
Chyna and Toni sit down for individual therapy sessions. guest stars: Dr. Siri Sat Nam Singh (marriage & family therapist)
9	"That Shrinking Feeling – Part 2"	September 8, 2019
Chyna and Toni take part in a joint therapy session to resolve their issues. guest stars: Dr. Siri Sat Nam Singh (marriage & family therapist)
10	"No Hard Feelings"	September 15, 2019
Chyna and Treasure meet up to discuss their falling out, leading to an explosive confrontation in which Treasure accuses her of embezzlement. guest stars: Jay (Blac Chyna's makeup artist), Larry (Chyna's stylist), Mary (Chyna's friend & advisor)
11	"You Shouldn't Text in Church"	September 22, 2019
After her fight with Treasure, Chyna goes to church to heal. guest stars: Larry (Chyna's stylist), Mary (Chyna's friend & advisor), Bishop Noel Jones (senior pastor, City of Refuge Church), Loretta (friend & business partner of Bishop Jones)
12	"Get Out!"	September 29, 2019
Chyna kicks Jamaal out of her house after he betrays her, but when he returns to get his things, he won't leave. guest stars: Lynne (Chyna's lawyer)
13	"From Pillar to Post"	October 6, 2019
When Jamaal finally leaves, Chyna reflects on the events of the past few months. guest stars: Lira (Chyna's friend), Wasi (Tokyo Toni's security)

== Controversy ==
In 2021, Treasure Gemz alleged in an interview Blac Chyna's altercation with herself and her previous manager Jamaal Terrance on the show were scripted, calculated decisions by Chyna and Zeus for dramatic effect, in attempt to boost viewership and therefore profits.
