= Blac Chyna =

American model and socialite (born 1988)

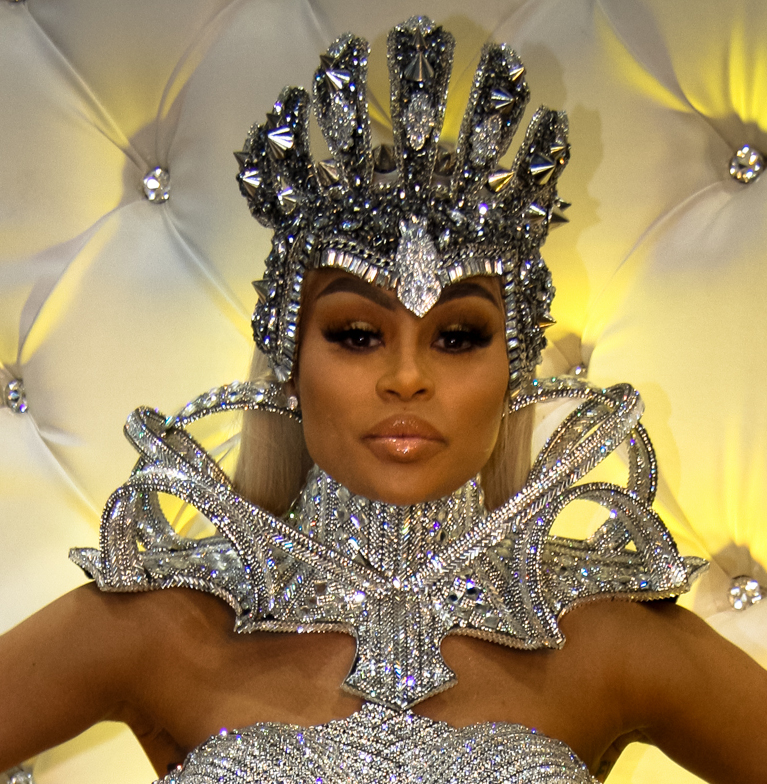
- White in 2019
- Born: Angela Renée White; May 11, 1988 (age 38); Washington, D.C., U.S.
- Education: Sacramento Theological Seminary and Bible College
- Occupations: Businesswoman; singer; rapper; actress; model; television personality
- Years active: 2008–present
- Partners: Tyga (2011–2014); Rob Kardashian (2016–2017)
- Children: 2
- Modeling information
- Height: 5 ft 2 in (1.57 m)
- Hair color: Black
- Eye color: Brown

Angela Renée White (born May 11, 1988), commonly known as Blac Chyna, is an American model, television personality, rapper, and socialite. She originally rose to prominence in 2010 as the stunt double for Nicki Minaj in the music video for the song "Monster" by Kanye West. She gained wider media attention after being name-dropped in the song "Miss Me" by Drake the same year, leading to a number of magazine appearances, including pieces in Dimepiece, Straight Stuntin and Black Men's Magazine. In 2014, she launched her own makeup brand, "Lashed by Blac Chyna", and a beauty salon in Encino, Los Angeles. She has since made a number of media appearances, including in her own reality television shows, Rob & Chyna and The Real Blac Chyna.

== Career ==
While stripping at King of Diamonds, a popular Miami club, Blac Chyna's unusual and "exotic" look made her popular; radio host Angela Yee described her as looking "like someone who was going to be famous." In 2010, Drake name-dropped her in "Miss Me". Her rising popularity led to modeling jobs on the covers of Dimepiece, Straight Stuntin and Black Men's Magazine. Later that year, she was cast as Nicki Minaj's stunt double in the song "Monster" by Kanye West.

Throughout her career, Blac Chyna has undergone several surgeries for buttock augmentation and breast enhancement, but has also had surgery to reduce the size of her chest.

In February 2013, she enrolled in JLS Professional Make Up Artist School. In December 2013, she launched her online boutique, "88fin", filled with new clothing and products from her clothing line of the same name. Also that month, she launched her own brand of adhesive eyelashes, "Lashed by Blac Chyna". In February 2014, she purchased a beauty bar in Encino, Los Angeles, which offers makeup courses.

Since 2016, she has appeared in a number of reality television shows, including E!'s Keeping Up with the Kardashians, and her own reality show with then-boyfriend Rob Kardashian, Rob & Chyna, also on the E! network. In 2019, she starred in The Real Blac Chyna on Zeus Network. She has also appeared in Tokyo Toni's Finding Love ASAP! with her mother, and VH1's Love & Hip Hop: Hollywood.

Blac Chyna produced content on OnlyFans, which she joined in April 2020. She subsequently departed from the platform in 2023.

== Personal life ==
In December 2011, Blac Chyna appeared in the music video for the song "Rack City" by rapper Tyga; she has said that Tyga asked her to join him on tour that year, but she refused. They began dating in December 2011, and had a son together in October 2012. They split in 2014 when Tyga began a relationship with Kylie Jenner, leading to a number of social media feuds between Blac Chyna and Jenner that ended when Blac Chyna started dating Jenner's half-brother, Rob Kardashian, in 2016. In November 2016, she gave birth to their daughter.

In December 2016, Kardashian announced on his Instagram post that he and Blac Chyna had split. They reconciled a few days later, but separated again in February 2017. In July 2017, Kardashian posted sexually explicit photos of Blac Chyna on social media, leading to Blac Chyna's obtaining a temporary restraining order against him. In October 2017, Blac Chyna filed a more than $100 million lawsuit against the Kardashian family for defamation. The trial began in April 2022. On May 2, 2022, a jury found in favor of the Kardashian family, with no damages being awarded to Chyna.

In March 2023, Blac Chyna revealed that she had been baptized a year earlier following her conversion to Christianity. She also stated that she had deleted her OnlyFans account, while also reversing some of her plastic surgery and removing her tattoo of Baphomet in light of her newfound faith. Blac Chyna became engaged to Derrick Milano in October 2023 after a year of dating; he reportedly proposed to her during Howard University's homecoming celebration.

== Discography ==
List of singles released by Blac Chyna, showing year released
Title	Year
"Seen Her"	2020
"Cash Only" (with Trippie Redd)	2020
"My Word" (featuring Too $hort and Keak da Sneak)	2020
"Doom" (featuring Asian Doll)	2021
"Hollywood"	2021
"Thick" (featuring Desiigner)	2021
"Maui" (featuring Desiigner)	2021
"Photoshop"	2021
"Can't See Me"	2022

== Filmography ==
=== Film ===
Year	Title	Role	Notes
2014	Percentage	-	
2017	Sexy Women Beg for Healthcare	Herself	Short
2022	Secret Society 2: Never Enough	Vicki	
2023	Vicious Affair	Kim	
2023	Women of the Jury	Dina	
2024	I Thought My Husband's Wife Was Dead	Gina	TV movie
2025	Pardon Me: The Bevelyn B. Williams Story	Bevelyn B. Williams	

=== Television ===
Year	Title	Role	Notes
2014–18	Keeping Up with the Kardashians	Herself	Guest: Season 9 & 14, Recurring Cast: Season 12–13
2016	Rob & Chyna	Herself	Main Cast
2017	RuPaul's Drag Race	Herself	Episode: "Grand Finale"
2017	Wild 'n Out	Herself/Team Captain	Episode: "Blac Chyna/It's a Movie"
2018	Black Card Revoked	Herself	Episode: "Blac Chyna, DeRay Davis, LeToya Luckett"
2018	Hip Hop Squares	Herself/Panelist	Recurring Panelist: Season 5
2019	The Real Blac Chyna	Herself	Main Cast
2019	Love & Hip Hop: Hollywood	Herself	Recurring Cast: Season 6
2019	Tokyo Toni's Find Love Asap!	Herself	Recurring Cast
2021	Ridiculousness	Herself	Episode: "Blac Chyna"
2022–24	The Black Hamptons	Karrin	Main Cast
2023	Special Forces: World's Toughest Test	Herself/Contestant	Contestant: Season 2
2024	Where Is Wendy Williams?	Herself	Episode: "I Am Gorgeous"
2024	College Hill: Celebrity Edition	Herself	Main Cast
2025	The Family Business	Karrin	Recurring Cast: Season 6

=== Music videos ===
- "Monster" by Kanye West, Jay-Z, Rick Ross, Nicki Minaj and Bon Iver
- "Come on a Cone" by Nicki Minaj
- "Rack City" (Version 1 & 2) by Tyga
- "Rake It Up" by Yo Gotti and Mike WiLL Made-It featuring Nicki Minaj
- "Tutu" by 6ix9ine
- "Body" by Megan Thee Stallion
- "Seen Her" (Official music video released in 2020)

== See also ==
- List of models in music videos
- Southern hip-hop
- Video vixen
