= Sevil Hajiyeva =

Azerbaijani singer (1968–2000)

Sevil Hajiyeva Sevil Maqsud qızı Hacıyeva
- Born: 3 October 1968; Baku, Azerbaijan SSR, Soviet Union
- Died: 12 September 2000 (aged 31) Los Angeles, California, U.S.
- Genres: Pop
- Occupations: Singer, lead vocalist
- Years active: 1980s–1990s
- Formerly of: Karvan; Qaya

Sevil Magsud gizi Hajiyeva (Azerbaijani: Sevil Hacıyeva; 3 October 1968 – 12 September 2000) was an Azerbaijani singer and lead vocalist of the music groups Karvan and Qaya.

== Life and career ==
Sevil Hajiyeva was born on 3 October 1968 in Azerbaijan's capital Baku and graduated from the piano department of Baku Academy of Music (then called Azerbaijan State Conservatory).

In the late 1980s, she became one of the most prominent Azerbaijani singers. At that time she participated in the Baku Autumn-88 and Yurmala-89 song contests. As a lead vocalist, she became primarily associated with the music group Karvan. There, she sang her hit song "Şahzadə" (Prince). After Karvan's breakup, she was invited to sing in the vocal quartet Qaya by the group's art manager Teymur Mirzayev. There she sang until the mid-1990s, after which she disappeared from the public eye and settled in the United States.

== Death ==
On 12 September 2000, Hajiyeva died in Los Angeles from multiple gunshot wounds during an armed robbery. She was buried at Forest Lawn Memorial Park in Hollywood Hills, California.
