= Mỹ Tâm =

Vietnamese singer-songwriter

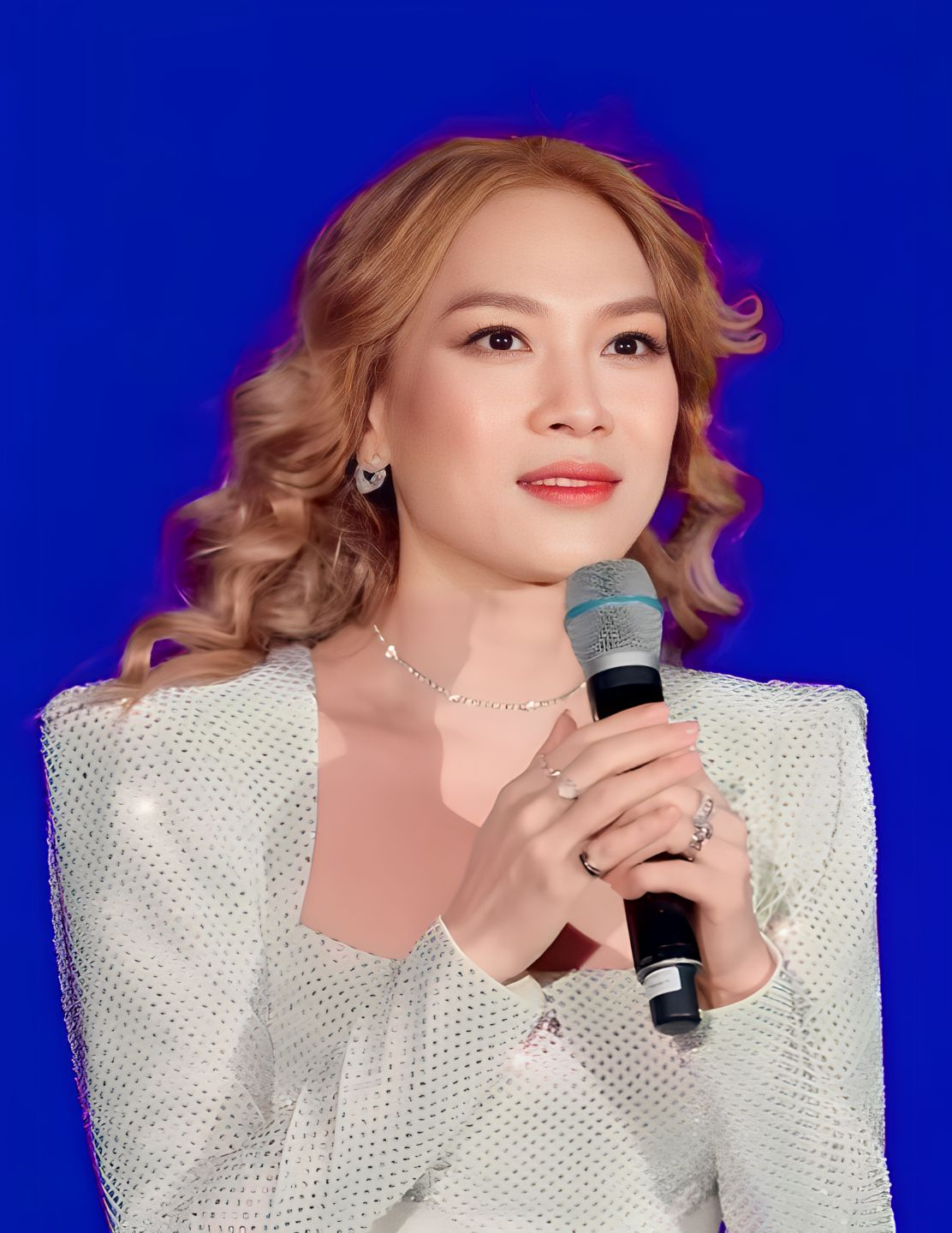
- Mỹ Tâm in 2023

Background information
- Born: Phan Thị Mỹ Tâm; 16 January 1981 (age 45); Da Nang, Vietnam
- Genres: Pop; dance-pop; acoustic; blues; jazz
- Occupations: Singer; songwriter; dancer; actress; musical director
- Instruments: Vocals
- Years active: 1999–present
- Label: MT Entertainment (2007–)

Phan Thị Mỹ Tâm (born 16 January 1981) is a Vietnamese singer and songwriter. Dubbed the Queen of V-pop, Mỹ Tâm was certified as the best-selling artist in the territory of 2014 by the International Federation of the Phonographic Industry (IFPI), and won the 2014 World Music Award for "Best-Selling Artist in the Territory".

== Life and career ==
=== Early life ===
Mỹ Tâm was born in Da Nang, Vietnam, in 1981. She started ballet at the age of six, and continued for three years. She then tried guitar and organ. She enjoyed singing, and did not regard it as a future career. She won first prize in her secondary school's singing competition, and the Gold Award at Beautiful Voice Spring, the city's solo singing competition. She was chosen for the Military School of Art in Hanoi; because of her family situation, she enrolled in Ho Chi Minh City Conservatory where she studied vocal training.

=== 1999–2002: Debut ===
Mỹ Tâm signed with Vafaco Record in 1999 and participated in singing bands. She received awards in singing competitions. Her first demo song was "Nhé anh" (Please, Dear), written by Nguyen Ha, who helped her build image at the start of her career. She co-wrote a soft ballad, "Mãi yêu" (Love, Always), with Nguyen Quang. (Note: These two songs would later be included in her debut album Endless Love.)

After her contract with Vafaco ended in 2000, she had her hair cut short and colored to a yellow-brown "Korean style". In 2000, she worked at the Music Center in Ho Chi Minh City. She entered the Asia New Singer Competition that was held in Shanghai, China, and won a bronze medal, which she considered pivotal to becoming a singer. She graduated in 2001 as a top student.

In 2001, Mỹ Tâm released her debut album Mãi Yêu (Love, Always). Her first audio single, "Cây Đàn Sinh Viên" (The Guitar of Students), became a popular song among university students of the 2000s .

=== 2003–2005: Queen of V-Pop ===
In 2003, Mỹ Tâm released her third studio album, Yesterday & Now. It contained two of her biggest hits: "Ước gì" (I Wish) and "Họa Mi Tóc Nâu" (Brown-Haired Nightingale). The other hits from the album included "Mùa hè thương yêu" (Summer of Love), "Tình Em Còn Mãi", and "Niềm tin chiến thắng" (Belief of Victory). "Mùa hè thương yêu" described a student's feeling before the summer holiday period, that she was going to miss her friends, and regretted that summer came too quickly. "Họa mi tóc nâu" was a reference to her earlier song "Tóc nâu môi trầm" (Brown hair Dark lips), while the older song was a dance track about an independent girl who feels how promising her love and her life is, "Nightingale" portrayed a young, innocent, and dedicated girl who is naive about love. In response to the gaffes she committed during her interviews for the first two albums, she changed her image for the third album, and grew her hair longer than before. "Niềm tin chiến thắng" was a ballad that became a rally song for the Vietnamese team in the SEA Games. It is about a person who strongly believes in a day of victory, despite all the difficulties of the life around him.

=== 2006–2008: Vút Bay (Fly), Thời Gian và Tôi (Time and Myself project) ===
In 2006, Mỹ Tâm worked with Korean Record Narimaru Pictures for her fifth album, Fly. She stated that she was unsatisfied with Vietnamese recording and studio techniques. She took more vocal training, dance lessons, and expanded her music genres. Instead of her usual pop and ballad style, she added uptempo R&B, hip-hop, and soul songs. Fly was released in December 2006.

In 2008, as part of her project Thời Gian và Tôi (The Time and Myself), (Note: The project "Melodies of Time" has also been translated as "The Time and Me" and "The Time and Myself") She created her own company named Mỹ Mỹ Tâm Entertainment (MT Entertainment). "Time and Myself"'s project has been planned to have five albums and a live show, and "is about those who always look back to the past to live a better future". She released her sixth album, Trở Lại (Come Back), on 17 April. Unlike Fly, the Korean producers were only in charge of recording and mastering the record. All the tracks were composed and handled by Vietnamese producers, including Mỹ Tâm, who produced "Như em dợi anh" (Like I'm Waiting For You). The album title expresses her return to the pop ballad genre with slow-jam and emotional feeling, and has a similar sound to her third album, with the Korean influence. Come Back brought Mỹ Tâm to a new level in her career: a more professional voice, improved English, and more skilled singing techniques (especially on the R&B track, "Và Em Có Anh" (And I Have You).

On 1 September, she released her seventh album, Nhịp Đập (To the Beat), which was also produced in Korea. She said that the songs have uptempo beats that "make you want to move and shake when you first hear it." She promoted this album and Come Back with a concert tour titled "Sóng Đa Tần" (To The Beat). She started the tour with a concert in Tao Dan stadium, Ho Chi Minh City, Vietnam. She won the "Singer of the year 2008" prize in the Devotion Award held by The Thao & Van Hoa (Sport & Culture) newspaper with participation and voting of 97 reporters. She would later release the concert DVD for Sóng Đa Tần (To The Beat).

=== 2009–2011: Melodies of Time project, Television and film activity ===
In April 2010, Mỹ Tâm released her compilation album, named after her project, Những Giai Điệu Của Thời Gian (Melodies of Time) project. In a slideshow article by ABC News (America) in August, she was listed among 12 "ABC's Global Pop Sensations You've Never Heard Of".

She participated as a judge on the fourth season of Sao Mai Điểm Hẹn, a biannual reality-television singing competition by VTV3. (Note: Sao Mai Điểm Hẹn is held every two years on the even year, starting in 2004. There is another Sao Mai competition that is held every odd year.) She judged alongside music producers Tuấn Khanh and Hồ Hoài Anh. She was noted for her frank and hard-hitting remarks, but displayed a sense of humor, and gave constructive feedback to the contestants. She received positive publicity for her fashion choices during the series as she matched her outfits to each theme in the competition.

She starred in the musical television drama Cho Một Tình Yêu (For a Love), which was produced by BHD film studio, and directed by Nguyễn Tranh of Lê Hóa. She also served as the musical director, where she composed some original songs, and mixed in others. She would later release a single of the title track with eight different versions, each of which involved a different instrument, including guitar, piano, trombone and trumpet.

The series premiered on VTV3 on 7 October, and ran for 37 episodes. It was the first to star contemporary Vietnamese singers including herself, Tuấn Hưng, Quang Dũng, Minh Thuận, and Minh Tú. After the first episode aired, Mỹ Tam's fans uploaded her songs which generated 50,000 hits overnight. While the series received mixed reviews from critics regarding the plot and acting, the musical scenes were praised for their originality and congruousness.

=== 2012–2015: Vietnam Idol, Mỹ Tâm and The Voice of Vietnam ===
In May 2012, Mỹ Tâm performed at the MTV EXIT concert alongside Simple Plan at the Mỹ Đình National Stadium in Hanoi for the purpose of advocacy against human trafficking. She was appointed MTV EXIT's representative in Vietnam. On 29 May 2012, Mỹ Tâm was announced to be replacing Siu Black as a judge for the fourth season of Vietnam Idol alongside remaining judges Quốc Trung and Nguyễn Quang Dũng. The season aired in August 2012. Throughout the competition, Mỹ Tâm praised Hương Giang, a top-16 contestant and a transgender woman. "The thing that surprises me is not your voice, it's your effort," she said. "Your singing is not absolutely excellent, but your effort makes us want to see how you can improve." The contestant had previously competed as a male, and the sex change gave her a second chance to compete.

On 24 August 2013, Mỹ Tâm set up an acoustic-styled music show called "Send to My Love" in Ho Chi Minh City. She continued to bring the show to Hanoi on 26 October, before hosting a charity event in Da Nang on 16 January 2014. Mỹ Tâm confirmed her return to Vietnam Idol for its fifth season on 21 September. In the celebration ceremony of 2 years MTV Europe Music Award's establishment on 27 September 2013, My Tam became the first representative of Vietnam to be nominated for the "Best Worldwide Act" award. After lost to Li Yuchun from China, she received the "Outstanding Southeast Asian Artist" trophy from MTV Vietnam representative on the Vietnam Idol stage on 23 March 2014. On 22 October 2013, Mỹ Tâm released a music video for the song "Em phải làm sao", which received 200,000 views on the day of its publication. After Vietnam Idol wrapped up its fifth season in May 2014, Mỹ Tâm guest judged Your Face Sounds Familiar for a week's performance show which was broadcast on 7 June. Mỹ Tâm won a VTV Award for the "Outstanding Artist" category on 5 September.

On 28 September 2014, Mỹ Tâm announced her first concert after 10 years- "Heartbeat", taking place in Ho Chi Minh City and Hanoi, with free ticket. The two concerts attracted approximately 40,000 people at the Military Zone 7 Stadium in Ho Chi Minh City; and about 25,000 audiences at Hang Day Stadium in Hanoi. Her tour brought her a nomination for the 2015 "Tour of the Year" category of the Devotion Award. A DVD which recorded the showcase of Heartbeat in Ho Chi Minh City on 20 April 2015, before the release of the two live shows in Ho Chi Minh City and Hanoi on 22 and 26 April 2015 respectively, to recreate the atmosphere of "Heartbeat" with highlight performances throughout the two shows, had sold 3,600 copies in four hours of debut. The DVD gathered more than 1 billion and 80 million VND and reached the milestone of 10,000 copies in a month.

On 12 April 2015, Mỹ Tâm was the last to confirm to become a coach on the third season of The Voice of Vietnam alongside Thu Phương, Tuấn Hưng and Đàm Vĩnh Hưng. Her final contestant, Đức Phúc was crowned the winner on the finale broadcast on 20 September, making Mỹ Tâm the winning coach on her first attempt as a coach. Mỹ Tâm did not return to The Voice for its fourth season and was replaced by Tóc Tiên. At the VTV Award 2015 took place on 6 September, Mỹ Tâm won the "Artist of the Year" category for the second consecutive time.

=== 2016–: Tâm 9 album and First Love concert ===
From 2016 to 2017, Mỹ Tâm focused on producing her ninth studio album and released a few music videos, including “Đôi mắt màu xanh”, “Hãy về với nhau”, and “Cuộc tình không may”. On 3 December 2017, Mỹ Mỹ Tâm released her ninth studio pop soul album, Tâm 9. In the first day release, 5,000 copies of Tâm 9 was sold out in one hour. More than 20,000 CD were sold in Vietnam and became the "best selling album in Vietnam". In January 2018, Tâm 9 climbed to number 10 on the Billboard World Albums Chart, making Mỹ Mỹ Tâm the first Vietnamese artist to reach the chart’s top ten. "Tâm 9" was listed as "best selling album" on ITunes and Amazon. In March 2018, Mỹ Tâm was honored with the titles of "Singer of the Year" and "Album of the year" (Tam 9) at the Devotion Music Awards 2018.

On 20 October 2018, Mỹ Tâm's concert, titled "My Tam, First Love", was held at the Jangchung Gymnasium in the central of Seoul. The concert marked one of her overseas performances, as it was held in a venue in Seoul, South Korea. There were 4000 people attended. After that, she became the first Southeast Asia singer to hold a concert in Jangchung Gymnasium.

== Charities ==
On 4 April 2008, Mỹ Tâm established the My Tam (MT) Foundation, a charity that operates on contributions from MT Entertainment, her fans, and others. "Nâng bước ngày mai" ("Sustain the Steps of Tomorrow") is a project that has reached cities and regions including Ho Chi Minh City, Huế, Da Nang, Nghệ An, Gia Lai, Bình Định, Phú Yên, Cần Thơ, Đắk Lắk, An Giang and Hà Tĩnh. The project builds houses for the poor, and has scholarships for the underprivileged. Every year, MT Foundation creates charity for poor people in the remote area.

== Artistry ==
Mỹ Tâm has a three-octave vocal range. She is a mezzo-soprano with a deep, powerful and clear voice. that fits her into a variety of genres, including pop, dance and rock. Prior to her album Fly (Vút Bay), she was criticized for her lackluster performances that tended to focus more on vocal mechanics than emotions. Fly was highly acclaimed by singer Mỹ Linh, as it "marked Mỹ Mỹ Tâm's wise move with her voice becoming more subtle and emotional, which would do her good in the long run".

Mỹ Tâm has been praised by critics for her live singing while performing complex dance moves. In her live shows and concert tours, she sings 20-30 songs, and maintains a strong, passionate voice.

== Discography ==
=== Studio albums ===
- Mãi Yêu (lit: Endless Love) (2001)
- Đâu Chỉ Riêng Em (lit: Not Only Me) (2002)
- Ngày Ấy & Bây Giờ / Yesterday & Now (2003)
- Hoàng Hôn Thức Giấc (The Color of My Life) (2005)
- Vút Bay (Fly) (2006)
- Trở Lại (lit: The Return) (2008)
- Nhịp đập / TO THE BEAT (2008)
- Mỹ Tâm (Self-titled) (2013)
- Tâm 9 (2017)

=== Reissue ===
- Dường Như Ta Đã.../ Live Tour Sức Mạnh Của Những Ước Mơ (We Seemed To Be.../ 'The Power of Dreams' Tour Album)

=== Compilation albums ===
- Melodies of Time 1: Những Giai Điệu Của Thời Gian 1 (2010)
- Melodies of Time 2: Những Giai Điệu Của Thời Gian 2 - Quê hương Đất nước (2010)
- Bolero Edition (2021)

=== Soundtracks ===
- Album nhạc phim Cho một tình yêu (For A Love The Soundtrack) (2010)
- Album nhạc phim Chị Trợ Lý Của Anh (My Dear Assistant!: Original Motion Picture Soundtrack) (2019)

=== Singles & EPs ===
- "Thoát ly" (Outbreak) (2001)
- "Cây đàn sinh viên" (The Guitar of Youth) (March 2002) including title track, "Quê hương tuổi thơ tôi" (My Childhood Hometown) and "Tiếng lòng xao động" (Love awakes)
- "Ban mai tình yêu" (Dawn of Love) (May 2002) including the title track, "Tình lỡ cách xa" (Falling Apart) and "Vấn vương" (Longing)
- "Dấu chấm hỏi" (Question mark) (2002)
- "Hát với dòng sông" (Sing with the River) (2002)
- "Giai điệu tình yêu: Tiếng hát Mỹ Mỹ Tâm" (Love Songs from Mỹ Mỹ Tâm) (2003) including various tracks such as "Đôi cánh tình yêu" (Wings of Love) and "Hãy tha thứ cho em" (Forgive Me)
- "Dường Như Ta Đã... (We Seemed To be...) (Single) (2005)
- "Hãy Đến Bên Em (I KNOW YOU KNOW)" (Single) (2006)
- "Giọt Sương" (THE DEWDROP)(Single) (2006)
- "Bí Mật" (SECRET) (2006)
- "Cho một tình yêu - Mini Album" (For A Love - EP) (2011) - [including different versions of the title track]

=== EPs ===
- "My Soul 1981" (Night 1) (2022)
- "My Soul 1981" (Night 2) (2022)
- "My Soul 1981" (Night 3) (2022)
- "My Soul 1981" (Final Gala) (2022)

=== Digital singles ===
- "Xin Lỗi (from "Cho Một Tình Yêu" Soundtrack)" (Apologize) - Single (2011)
- "Ngày Vắng Anh (from "Cho Một Tình Yêu" Soundtrack)" (A Day Without You) - Single (2011)
- "Một Phút Cô Đơn" (Lonely) - Single (2011)
- "Sai" (Wrong) - Single (2012)
- "Chuyện Như Chưa Bắt Đầu (Like There Was No Beginning)" - Single (2012)
- "Trắng Đen (Black & White)" - Single (2012)
- "Sự Thật Ta Yêu Nhau" (The Truth)" - Single (2013)
- "My Friend (Bạn Tôi)" - Single (2013)
- "Vì Em Quá Yêu Anh" (Crazy Love) - Single (2013)
- "Như Một Giấc Mơ" (Like A Dream) - Single (2013)
- "Gởi tình yêu của em (Letter To My Love)" - Single (2013)
- "Em Phải Làm Sao? (What Could I Do?)" - Single (2014)
- "Nắm Lấy Tay Nhau (Hold My Hand)" - Single (2014)
- "Thương Ca Tiếng Việt" (An Ode To Mothertongue) - Single (2014)
- "Khi Cô Đơn Anh Gọi Tên Em (Single)" (Kokoro No Tomo - Cover) (2015)
- "Đôi Mắt Màu Xanh (Blue Eyes) (Single) (2016)
- "Hãy Về Với Nhau (Come Back To Me) (Single) (2016) // Note: This single was the sequel to "Em phải làm sao" (What Should I Do) music video as well as the final instalment of the music video trilogy starting from "Chuyện như chưa bắt đầu" (Pretend we had no start).
- "Cuộc Tình Không May" (Tragic Love) (2016)
- "EM THÌ KHÔNG (Toi Jamais) [Remix] Featuring Karik" (2017)
- "Đâu chỉ Riêng Em" (Not Only Me) (2017)
- "Đừng Hỏi Em" (Don't Ask me) (2017)
- "Nếu Có Buông tay" (If You Let Go) (2017)
- "Người Hãy Quên Em Đi" (Please Forget Me) (2018)
- "Anh Chưa Từng Biết" (You Never Know) (2018)
- "Rực Rỡ Tháng Năm (from "Tháng Năm Rực Rỡ" Soundtrack) " (The Bright Days - from "SUNNY" Remake Soundtrack)
- "Muộn Màng là Từ Lúc (Late From The Beginning)" (Single) (2018)
- "Nơi Mình Dừng Chân (from "Chị Trợ Lý Của Anh" Soundtrack)" (The End Of Us - from "Dear My assistant!" Original Motion Pictures Soundtrack) (2019)
- "Khi Ta Yêu (from "Chị Trợ Lý Của Anh" Soundtrack)" (When We're In Love - from "Dear My assistant!" Original Motion Pictures Soundtrack) (2019)
- "Đời Là Giấc Mơ (from "Chị Trợ Lý Của Anh" Soundtrack)" (Life Is A Dream - from "Dear My assistant!" Original Motion Pictures Soundtrack) (2019)
- "Nếu Anh Đi (If You Leave)" (Single) (2019)
- "Con Gái Như Em (from "Chị Trợ Lý Của Anh" Soundtrack) (Girls Like Me - from "Dear My assistant!" Original Motion Pictures Soundtrack) (2019)
- "Anh Đợi Em Được Không?" (Wait For Me) - Single (2019)
- "Vậy Cũng Vui" (Fine For Me) - Single (2020)
- "Đúng Cũng Thành Sai" (When The Right Wrongs) - Single (2020)
- "Anh Chưa Biết Đâu" (You Don't Know Me) - Single (2020)
- "Hào Quang" (Halo) - Single (2021)
- "Cuộc Hẹn Trong Mơ" (Meet Me In My Dream) - Single (2021)
- "Hẹn Ước Từ Hư Vô (Live From My Soul 1981)" - Single (2022)
- "The Light (from "Người Giữ Thời Gian" Soundtrack)" - Single (2023)
- "Vì Em Tất Cả" (Because of Me) - Single (2023)
- "Cố Hương" (My Hometown) - Single (2024)
- "Cứ Vui Lên" (Be Happy! My Beloved Friends) - Single (2024)

=== Tour / Live Concerts ===
- Liveshow: Yesterday & Now (2004)
- Live Tour: The Power of Dreams (2006)
- Live Concert Tour: To The Beat - The Multi-frequency Wave (2008)
- Liveshow: Melodies of Times - 10 Years Anniversary (2011)
- Live Concert: For a Love (2011)
- Live Concert: LETTER TO MY LOVE (2013)
- Live Concert Tour: HEARTBEAT (2014)
- My Tam & Kotaro Oshio: Dreaming Together In Osaka (2015)
- Liveshow Ô Cửa Màu Xanh (2016)
- The Showcase Tour 'Tâm 9' (2017)
- Live Concert 'First Love' in Seoul (2018)
- Liveshow Tri Âm (Soulmates - The Liveshow) (2021 - 2022)
- My Soul 1981 (2022)
- The My Soul 1981 Gala - Live in Da Lat (2022)
- See The Light concert (2025)

== Television ==
- Sao Mai Điểm Hẹn (Season 4) (2010) - Judge
- Vietnam Idol (Season 4) (2012 - 2013) - Judge
- Vietnam Idol (Season 5) (2013 - 2014) - Judge
- The Voice (Season 3) (2015) - Mentor
- Cover Star Vietnam (Season 1) (2017) - Judge
- Giọng Ca Bất Bại (2018) - Judge
- Vietnam Idol (Season 8) (2023) - Judge

== Filmography ==
- Cho Một Tình Yêu (For a Love) (2010 - 2011) - as Linh Đan
- Chị trợ lý của anh (My Dear Assistant!) (2019) - as Khả Doanh
- Người Giữ Thời Gian: Tri Âm The Movie (The Time Keeper: Soulmate The Movie) (2023) - as herself
- TÀI (TÀI) (2026) - as Út Lanh

== Tours / Live Concerts ==
Show Dates & Year	Concert Title	Present & Sponsor	Cities & Venues	Attendance & Notes
2002	Liveshow Let the Children's Heart Shine' (Cho Trái Tim Trẻ Thơ Tỏa Sáng)	My Tam Production, Sunsilk	Ho Chi Minh City: 4A Field of Youth Cultural Center	5,000 / 5,000
Nov 2002	Live Tour "Dream to Shine With My Tam" (Cùng Mỹ Mỹ Tâm Tỏa Sáng Ước Mơ)	My Tam Production, Sunsilk	Ho Chi Minh City: 23/9 Park Hanoi: Westlake Water Park Da Nang: Nguyen Tri Phuong Sports Center	15,000 / 15,000
Mar-Apr 2004	Liveshow "Yesterday and Now" (Ngày Ấy & Bây Giờ)	My Tam Production, Phuong Nam Film, Pepsi, Sunsilk, Pacific Airlines	Ho Chi Minh City: Quân khu 7 Stadium Hanoi: Mỹ Đình National Stadium	Ho Chi Minh City: 15,000 / 15,000 Hanoi: 18,000 / 18,000 Budget: 3 billion đồng ($250,000 as of 2003) (Highest budget in the Vietnam music industry - as of 2003), first sell-out,
Aug 2004	Liveshow Music & Friends "My Childhood Hometown" (Âm Nhạc & Những Người Bạn "Quê Hương Tuổi Thơ Tôi")	My Tam Production, VTV, Honda	Da Nang: Nguyen Tri Phuong Sports Center	5,000 / 5,000 VTV show: Music and Friends
Dec 2004	Live Tour "Live With Your Best" (Sống Hết Mình)	My Tam Production, Pepsi	Ho Chi Minh City: Lan Anh Music Center Hanoi: Hall A1 Giang Vo Exhibition & Fair Center	Ho Chi Minh City: 6,340 / 6,340 Hanoi: 3,500 / 3,500
Sep-Oct 2005	Live Tour "The Power of Dreams" (Sức Mạnh Của Những Ước Mơ)	My Tam Production, Honda	Ho Chi Minh City: Outdoor Fied of Vietnam National University, Ho Chi Minh City Dormitory (1st Show), Banking University of Ho Chi Minh City (2nd Show), Quân khu 7 Stadium (3rd Show), Can Tho: Can Tho University Soccer Field (4th Show) Da Lat: Dalat University (5th Show) Da Nang: Stadium Of Da Nang University of Technology (6th Show) Hanoi: Stadium Of Hanoi National University of Education (7th Show), Stadium Of VNU University of Languages and International Studies (8th Show), Giang Vo Exhibition & Fair Center Outdoor Field (9th Show) Ho Chi Minh City: Dong Dao Club (10th Show - Encore)	Ho Chi Minh City: 34,000 / 34,000 Can Tho: 12,000 / 12,000 Da Lat: 10,000 / 10,000 Da Nang: 10,000 / 10,000 Hanoi: 30,000 / 30,000
Sep-Oct 2008	Live Concert Tour 2008 "TO THE BEAT" (Sóng Đa Tần)	MT Entertainment	Ho Chi Minh City: Tao Dan Stadium Hanoi: Giang Vo Exhibition & Fair Center Outdoor Field Da Nang: Quan Khu 5 Stadium Can Tho: Cần Thơ Stadium	Ho Chi Minh City: 10,000 / 10,000 Hanoi: 10,000 / 10,000 Da Nang: 10,000 / 10,000 Can Tho: 10,000 / 10,000
Apr 2010	"Melodies of Time" Showcase (Những Giai Điệu Của Thời Gian)	MT Entertainment	Ho Chi Minh City: Municipal Theatre, Ho Chi Minh City	1,800 / 1,800
Jan-Mar 2011	Liveshow 10 Years Anniversary 'Melodies of Times' (Kỉ niệm 10 năm ca hát "Những Giai Điệu Của Thời Gian)	MT Entertainment	Ho Chi Minh City: Queen Plaza Center Hanoi: Viet Xo Friendship Labour Cultural Palace Theater	Ho Chi Minh City: 700 / 700 (Note: The attendance for her anniversary shows was limited as she wanted to hold a cozy show to thank all partners and colleagues who have offered her support over the past 10 years. There were 700 attendees in Ho Chi Minh City and 1000 in Hanoi. There was a buffet, a display of photos, and intimate talks. She performed 30 unplugged songs. Ticket fees were 2.5 million and 3.5 million đồng respectively, the highest ever charged in all her shows and concerts thus far.) Hanoi: 1,111 / 1,111
Sep 2011	Live concert 'For A Love' (Cho Một Tình Yêu)	MT Entertainment	Ho Chi Minh City: Municipal Theatre, Ho Chi Minh City) Hanoi: Viet Xo Friendship Labour Cultural Palace Theater (2 shows)	Ho Chi Minh City: 1,800 / 1,800 Hanoi: 2,222 / 2,222
Aug 2013 - Oct 2013 - Jan 2014	Live Concert 'Letter To My Love' (Gởi Tình Yêu Của Em)	MT Entertainment	Ho Chi Minh City: Queen Plaza Center Hanoi: Viet Xo Friendship Labour Cultural Palace Theater Da Nang: Trung Vuong Theater	Ho Chi Minh City: 1,000 / 1,000 Hanoi: 1,111 / 1,111 Da Nang: 1,203 / 1,203
Nov 2014	Live Concert Tour 'HeartBeat' (Nhịp Đập)	MT Entertainment, OPPO	Ho Chi Minh City: Quân khu 7 Stadium Hanoi: Hàng Đẫy Stadium	Ho Chi Minh City: 35,000 / 35,000 Hanoi: 25,000 / 25,000
Apr 2015	The Concert Film Showcase 'HeartBeat' (Nhịp Đập)	MT Entertainment, OPPO	Ho Chi Minh City: 4A Field of Youth Cultural Center Hanoi: Viet Xo Friendship Labour Cultural Palace	Ho Chi Minh City: 5,000 / 5,000 Hanoi: 2,000 / 2,000
Apr 2015	Dreaming Together in Osaka (with Kotaro Oshio)	MT Entertainment, NHK Television Network	NHK Osaka Hall	3,800 / 3,800
Nov 2015	Liveshow Nắm Lấy Tay Nhau (Hold My Hand)	MT Entertainment, Mediamax	Hanoi: Viet Xo Friendship Labour Cultural Palace Theater	1,111 / 1,111
Jan 2016	Liveshow Blue Window (Ô Cửa Màu Xanh)	MT Entertainment	Ho Chi Minh City: Hòa Bình Theater	2,500 / 2,500
Jul 2015	Liveshow Hãy Về Với Nhau (Ô Cửa Màu Xanh Revamped)	MT Entertainment, Mediamax	Hanoi: Viet Xo Friendship Labour Cultural Palace Theater	1,111 / 1,111
Dec 2017	The Album Showcase Tour "Tâm 9"	MT Entertainment, Yakult, Acecook	Ho Chi Minh City: Nguyen Hue Walking Street Hanoi: Dong Kinh Nghia Thuc Square Da Nang: BNF Stage Pham Van Dong Beach Park	Ho Chi Minh City: 15,000 / 15,000 Hanoi: 15,000 / 15,000 Da Nang: 10,000 / 10,000
Oct 2018	First Love Concert in Seoul	MT Entertainment, Yakult	Jangchung Arena	4,000 / 4,000
25 April 2021	Liveshow "Tri Âm (Soulmate)" in Ho Chi Minh City	MT Entertainment, Pops, VinID, Acecook	Phú Thọ Horse Racing Ground Stadium	25,000 / 25,000
Jan 2022 - Feb 2022	Unstaged Live Music Show 'My Soul 1981' (Virtual Concert)	MT Entertainment, NetHUB, Zalo Pay, Yamaha	MTE Studio Ho Chi Minh City	7 Jan (1st show) 16 Jan (2nd show) 24 Feb (3rd show)
26 & 27 Mar 2022	The 'My Soul 1981' Final Gala: Live in Da Lat	MT Entertainment, Pops, Zalo Pay, Yamaha, CONGTRI, Lululola Coffee+	Lululola Show Dalat	2,000 / 2,000
5 Nov 2022	Liveshow "Tri Âm (Soulmate)" in Hanoi	MT Entertainment, Cake, Acecook	Mỹ Đình National Stadium	32,000 / 32,000
9 Dec 2023	Liveshow "My Soul 1981: Season 2" in Ha Long Bay	MT Entertainment, Cake, Green Film, Thong Zeo,	Lighthouse Area Sun Grand Marina Town	5,885 / 5,885
11 May 2024	Liveshow "My Soul 1981: Season 3" in Ho Tram	MT Entertainment, Cake, Green Film, MT Cosmetics, Melia Ho Tram, Hamptons Plaza, Emerald Ho Tram	Hamptons Plaza Ho Tram	5.000 / 5,000
14 Jul 2024	Liveshow "My Soul 1981: Season 4" in Danang	MT Entertainment, Cake, Ariyana Beach Resort & Suites, SeABank, Danang Marriott Resort, M Hotel Danang.	Ariyana Convention Centre Danang, Vietnam	5.000 / 5,000
22 Dec 2024	Liveshow "My Soul 1981: Season 5" in Temecula, California, US	MT Entertainment	Pechanga Resort Casino Permit Stage	6,500 / 6,500
13 Dec 2025	Live Concert "See The Light" in Hanoi	MT Enterttainment, SeABank	Mỹ Đình National Stadium	40,000 / 40,000

== Awards ==
Devotion Music Awards

Devotion Music Awards, is an annual music award presented by Sports and Culture, a prestigious entertainment newspaper in Vietnam, to recognize the discoveries and creations contributed to the richness and development of Viet Nam pop music. The award is considered as a "Grammy Award" in Vietnamese music.

Year	Category	Nominated work/Recipient	Result	Note
2005	Best Show of the Year	Ngày Ấy Và Bây Giờ	Nominated	
2005	Best Artist of the Year	Herself	Nominated	
2006	Best Album of the Year	Hoàng Hôn Thức Giấc	Nominated	
2006	Best Artist of the Year	Herself	Nominated	
2006	Best Show of the Year	Sức Mạnh Của Những Giấc Mơ	Nominated	
2007	Best Album of the Year	Vút Bay	Nominated	
2007	Best Artist of the Year	Herself	Nominated	
2009	Best Album of the Year	Trở Lại	Nominated	
2009	Best Artist of the Year	Herself	Won	
2013	Best Artist of the Year	Herself	Won	
2013	Best Song of the Year	"Chuyện Như Chưa Bắt Đầu"	Nominated	
2014	Best Artist of the Year	Herself	Nominated	
2015	Best Artist of the Year	Herself	Won	
2015	Best Show of the Year	Heartbeat	Nominated	
2018	Best Album of the Year	Tâm 9	Won	
2018	Best Artist of the Year	Herself	Won	
2018	Best Music Video of the Year	"Đừng Hỏi Em"	Nominated	
2022	Best Song of the Year	"Hẹn Ước Từ Hư Vô"	Nominated	
2022	Best Female Artist of the Year	Herself	Nominated	
2022	Best Show of the Year	Tri Âm	Won	

Golden Apricot Blossom Awards

Year	Category	Nominated work/Recipient	Result	Note
2001	Favorite Female Singer	"Cây Đàn Sinh Viên"	Won	
2003	Favorite Female Singer	"Ước Gì"	Won	
2006	Favorite Female Pop Singer	"Dường Như Ta Đã"	Nominated	
2008	Favorite Female Pop Singer	"Hơi Ấm Ngày Xưa"	Won	
2010	Favorite Female Pop Singer	"Xin Thời Gian Qua Mau"	Nominated	
2010	Song of the Year	"Cho Một Tình Yêu"	Nominated	
2014	Favorite Female Pop Singer	"Nắm Lấy Tay Nhau"	Nominated	
2015	Favorite Female Pop Singer	"Khi Cô Đơn Anh Gọi Tên Em"	Nominated	
2018	Favorite Female Pop Singer	"Người Hãy Quên Em Đi"	Nominated	
2018	Favorite Music Video	"Người Hãy Quên Em Đi"	Nominated	
2019	Favorite Female Pop Singer	"Nơi Mình Dừng Chân"	Nominated	
2019	Song of the Year	"Anh Đợi Em Được Không"	Nominated	
2020	Favorite Female Pop Singer	"Đúng Cũng Thành Sai"	Nominated	
2021	Favorite Pop Singer	"Hào Quang"	Nominated	

Green Wave Music Awards

Green Wave Music Awards is one of the oldest and most prestigious annual music awards in the Vietnamese music industry. It was started in 1997 with the governing body being the 99.9 MHz FM radio station of the Voice of the People of Ho Chi Minh City.

Year	Category	Nominated work/Recipient	Result	Note
2002	Top 10 Artists of the Year	Herself	Recipient	
2003	Top 10 Artists of the Year	Herself	Recipient	
2004	Top 10 Artists of the Year	Herself	Recipient	
2005	Top 10 Artists of the Year	Herself	Recipient	
2006	Top 10 Artists of the Year	Herself	Recipient	
2007	Top 10 Artists of the Year	Herself	Recipient	
2008	Top 10 Artists of the Year	Herself	Recipient	
2009	Top 10 Artists of the Year	Herself	Recipient	
2009	Top 10 Composers of the Year	Herself	Recipient	
2009	Female Artist of the Year	Herself	Nominated	
2010	Female Artist of the Year	Herself	Won	
2010	Top 10 Artists of the Year	Herself	Recipient	
2011	Top 10 Artists of the Year	Herself	Recipient	
2011	Top 10 Composers of the Year	Herself	Recipient	
2011	Album of the Year	Cho Một Tình Yêu	Nominated	
2011	Female Artist of the Year	Herself	Won	
2012	Female Artist of the Year	Herself	Won	
2012	Top 10 Artists of the Year	Herself	Recipient	
2013	Top 10 Artists of the Year	Herself	Recipient	
2013	Album of the Year	Mỹ Tâm	Nominated	
2018	Special Honours Award	Herself	Recipient	
2019	Original Soundtrack Song of the Year	"Nơi Mình Dừng Chân"	Nominated	
2022	Icon of the Year Award	Herself	Recipient	

MTV Europe Music Awards

Year	Category	Nominated work/Recipient	Result	Note
2014	Best Southeast Asia Act	Herself	Won	
2014	Best Southeast Asia, China, Hong Kong and Taiwan Act	Herself	Nominated	

Years	Awards
2000	Bronze Award, Asia New Singer Competition, Shanghai, China
2001	Exemplary Model of 2001, Vietnamese Television; Top 5 most promising singers, 1st Hoa Học Trò Music Awards
2002	Favorite singer, Thursday Evening Youth Club – Bến Thành Theatre; Talented Young Artist, Đẹp magazine; Golden Apricot Award, Working Class magazine; Best artist of the year, VTV Songs That I Love; Best artist (top 10 finalist), Blue Waves Musical Ceremony
2003	Talented Young Artist, Đẹp magazine; Golden Apricot Award, Working Class magazine; Best music video clip, VTV Songs That I Love; Best music video clip, Judges Panel, VTV Songs That I Love; Best artist, Vietnamnet; Best dressed artist, Fadin Fashion Academy; Heart of Vietnam award; The Platinum Award – Best female artist, Stage & Cinema magazine; Best artist (top 10 finalist), Blue Waves Musical Ceremony
2004	Maple Leaf Award, Chief Embassy of Canada; Gold Medal for the "Community Devotion" Award, Hanoi Culture Corporation and the Community Newspaper; Best artist (top 10 finalist), Blue Waves Musical Ceremony
2005	Best artist (top 10 finalist), Blue Waves Musical Ceremony
2006	Golden Rose award, VTC audiences; Best artist and composer (top 10 finalist), Blue Waves Music Ceremony; The Platinum Award – Best female artist, Stage & Cinema magazine; Best composer (top 10 finalist), Blue Waves Musical Ceremony; Best artist (top 10 finalist), Blue Waves Musical Ceremony
2007	Best Female Artist, HTV Awards (HCMC Television Network); Best artist (top 10 finalist), Blue Waves Musical Ceremony
2008	Best Female Artist, HTV Awards (HCMC Television Network); Golden Apricot Award, Working Class magazine; Singer of the Year Contribution Award, The Thao & Van Hoa (Sport & Culture) newspaper; Best artist (top 10 finalist), Blue Waves Musical Ceremony
2009	Singer of the year, Devotion Music Awards 2009; Best composer (top 10 finalist), Blue Waves Musical Ceremony; Best artist (top 10 finalist), Blue Waves Musical Ceremony
2010	Best Female Artist, HTV Awards (HCMC Television Network); ABC's Global Pop Sensations You've Never Heard Of, ABC News; Best artist (top 10 finalist), Blue Waves Musical Ceremony; Artist of the year, Blue Waves Musical Ceremony
2011	Best Music Video, MTV Awards; Best Artist, MTV Awards; Best composer (top 10 finalist), Blue Waves Musical Ceremony; Best artist (top 10 finalist), Blue Waves Musical Ceremony; Artist of the year, Blue Waves Musical Ceremony
2012	Best Asian Artist Award, 2012 Mnet Asian Music Awards in Hong Kong; Best artist (top 10 finalist), Blue Waves Musical Ceremony; Artist of the year, Blue Waves Musical Ceremony
2013	Singer of the Year. Devotion Music Awards 2013; Best artist (top 10 finalist), Blue Waves Musical Ceremony; Best Music Video (top 20 finalist), Yan Vpop 20 award; Best Southeast Asia Act at MTV Europe Music Awards 2013
2014	Best-selling Vietnamese Artist, 2014 World Music Awards; World's best Vietnamese live act (voted), 2014 World Music Awards; World's best Vietnamese entertainer (voted), 2014 World Music Awards; World's best Vietnamese artist (voted), 2014 World Music Awards; Best artist, VTV awards (Vietnam Television Network); Asia's Music Legend, Top Asia Corporate Ball
2015	Singer of the Year, Devotion Music Awards 2015; Best Vietnamese Artist, Big Apple Music Music Awards; Best Selling Artist of Asia, Big Apple Music Music Awards; Best artist, VTV awards (Vietnam Television Network)
2018	Singer of the year, Devotion Music Awards 2018; Album of the year, Devotion Music Awards 2018; Best artist, VTV awards (Vietnam Television Network) 2018
Other	Best artist over ten years, Blue Waves Musical Ceremony
