= Manana Japaridze =

Azerbaijani singer (born 1978)

Manana Japaridze მანანა ჯაფარიძე
- Born: 28 December 1978 (age 47); Tbilisi, Georgian SSR, USSR
- Genres: Pop, Estrada
- Occupation: Singer
- Years active: 1998–present
- Website: www.mananajaparidze.com

Manana Japaridze (Georgian: მანანა ჯაფარიძე; Azerbaijani: Manana Caparidze), or simply known as Manana, is a Georgian-Azerbaijani singer. She has been an Honorary Artist of Azerbaijan since 2009.

== Early life ==
Born and raised in Tbilisi, Georgia, she appeared on the professional stage at the age of five and was a singer in the very popular children's groups as "Tolia" and "Chiora". In the same year, she finished secondary school before being graduated from the Tbilisi Art Gymnasia.

In the year 1995, she entered the vocal department of the Tbilisi branch of the German Modern Art, Jazz, and Show-Business Academy. In 2000, she graduated from the academy. In her early years, Manana participated in various competitions for young singers, winning important awards. In 1996 she won the main award of the young singers' "Crystal Fir" competition in Borjomi, (Georgia), then in 1997 she became a laureate of the young singers' "Crystal Note" International competition in Moscow, Russia.

== Career ==
In 1998, Manana moved permanently to Baku, Azerbaijan, where she started her professional career. Manana's first performances in front of the Baku audience brought her big popularity and successes. Her talent, distinctive voice, and high artistry allowed her to transform from a young singer to one of the most popular and beloved artists, becoming the Diva Star of Azerbaijani Estrada. From 1999, Manana represented Azeri music and culture at many prestigious musical competitions and festivals with a great desire, where she won higher awards and prizes. Among Manana's awards, there is also the title of the Laureate of the International Competition of the Young Singers "UNIVERSTALENT - 2000" which took place in Prague, and the Television Musical Competition "Wider Circle" in Moscow.

=== Awards in Azerbaijan ===
Manana's active creative life in Azerbaijan was marked with the presentation to her of the Humay Award, for the best representation of Azerbaijan, its culture abroad. And she was also awarded "Qızıl Mikrofon" (Golden Microphone) which is one of the most prestigious awards in Azerbaijan, giving her the title "the best singer of the year".

Having represented Azerbaijan in many song competitions, she has won three "Grand Prix":

1. The international festival "Voice of Asia" in 1999, Almaty, Kazakhstan
2. The international festival "Slavyanskiy bazar" in 1999, Kiev, Ukraine
3. The international festival took place in 2000, Shanghai, China, where she also won the prize "Golden Voice of Asia".

=== The Voice Azerbaijan ===
International singing contest franchise, The Voice recently started in Azerbaijan. Manana is currently one of the judges of the first season.

== Personal life ==
In January 2008, Manana Japaridze married a businessman Giorgi Gabechava, whom she had met while on vacation in kobuleti. The couple has a daughter named Elizabeth (born 2008) and a son named David (born 2014).

== Albums ==
During her career, Manana released 7 albums and took 3 solo gigs.

- 2000 – Sənə verdim ürəyimi (I gave you my heart)
- 2001 – Dözməm bu ayrılığa (I can not afford to be away from you)
- 2003 – Sevirəm səni (I love you)
- 2004 – Bizim sevgimiz (Our love)
- 2004 – Orientasian
- 2005 – Səndən ayrı (Away from you)
- 2009 – Bəxt ulduzum (Star of luck)

[Spotify Account]

== Singles ==
- 2018 – Sən Yaşamaq Səbəbim (You are the reason to live)

== Videos ==
- 2001 - Bu Nə Cür Məhəbbətdir
- 2003 – Yol
- 2004 – Neyləyim
- 2005 – Səndən ayrı
- 2006 – Sevgimizin günləri
- 2007 – Sənsiz
- 2008 – Qəlbimin arzusu
- 2013 – Tənha Payız
- 2014 – Gözlərin danışsın
- 2015 – This is my time
- 2017 – Sarı gəlin
- 2017 – Party music
- 2017 – Can Azerbaycan
