= Do Me (P-Square song) =

Single by P-Square featuring Waje

from the album Game Over
- Released: 17 November 2008
- Genre: Afropop
- Length: 4:43
- Label: Square
- Songwriter: Paul Okoye
- Producers: P-Square; J. Martins (co-producer)

P-Square singles chronology
| "Temptation (Remix)" (2007) | "Do Me" (2008) | "No One Like You" (2008) |

Waje singles chronology
| "Do Me" (2008) | "Kolo" (2009) |

Music video
- "Do Me" on YouTube

"Do Me" is a song by Nigerian duo P-Square featuring Nigerian singer Waje. It was released on 17 November 2008 as a single off their third studio album Game Over (2007). Its music video, directed by Jude "Engees" Okoye, won awards at the Channel O Music Video Awards, SoundCity Music Video Awards, Nigerian Music Video Awards, and the Kora Awards.

== Background ==
"Do Me" originally appeared as the third track off the duo's third studio album Game Over (2007) before being released on iTunes as a standalone single on 17 November 2008. The song was written by Paul Okoye, one-half of P-Square. Paul said the song originated from a melody he came up with after waking from a dream, after which he shared the idea with his twin brother and J. Martins during a studio session. Waje first came into contact with P-Square after recording "Bobo Mi", a remake of their song "Omoge Mi" from Get Squared (2005). Chris Madubuko, the CEO of her record label Dome Records, sent the recording to the duo. They liked it and invited her to record vocals for Game Over. During those sessions, she recorded her parts for "Do Me". According to Waje, her involvement ended after the recording.

== Music video ==
The accompanying music video for "Do Me" was released in November 2007, and was later published to YouTube through Radial by the Orchard on 14 June 2009. It was shot in South Africa by the duo's older brother Jude "Engees" Okoye. Although Waje provided the song's chorus and backing vocals, she did not appear in the video. In later interviews, she said she could not go since she did not have a passport at the time. In a 2015 interview, she said she was sad about missing the video shoot, although her record label had been contacted about the arrangements.

== Controversy ==
In November 2025, Waje admitted to the Honest Bunch podcast that she wasn't paid for her vocals on "Do Me". She explained that she had no agreement with P-Square covering payment or credit for her contribution. Her work on the song ended after the recording sessions, before the music video was made. She also said that, as a young artist, she had little knowledge of music royalties and contracts and did not receive earnings from the song.

== Accolades ==
| Year | Awards ceremony | Award description(s) | Results | Ref. |
|---|---|---|---|---|
| 2008 | Channel O Music Video Awards | Best Duo or Group (P-Square for "Do Me") | Won | |
| 2008 | Channel O Music Video Awards | Video of the Year | Won | |
| 2008 | SoundCity Music Video Awards | Best Video | Won | |
| 2008 | SoundCity Music Video Awards | Best Cinematography | Won | |
| 2008 | SoundCity Music Video Awards | Best R&B/Pop Video | Nominated | |
| 2008 | Nigeria Entertainment Awards | Best Music Video of the Year | Won | |
| 2008 | Hip Hop World Awards | Song of the Year | Nominated | |
| 2008 | Hip Hop World Awards | Best Music Video (Jude Okoye for "Do Me") | Nominated | |
| 2008 | Nigerian Music Video Awards | Best Afro Pop Video | Won | |
| 2008 | Nigerian Music Video Awards | Video of the Year | Won | |
| 2008 | Nigerian Music Video Awards | Best Cinematography (Tosin Igho for "Do Me") | Won | |
| 2010 | Kora Awards | Best Video (Jude Okoye for "Do Me") | Won | |
