= 2014 World Music Awards =

22nd award event

- Official poster
- Date: May 27, 2014
- Location: Salle des Etoiles, Monte Carlo
- Country: Monaco
- Hosted by: Pamela Anderson & Jason Derulo
- Website: http://worldmusicawards.com/

The 2014 World Music Awards was a music awards ceremony that was held on May 27, 2014, at the Salle des Etoiles in Monte Carlo, Monaco. It was the 22nd edition of the show since its start in 1989, and the first ceremony since 2010, after which it went on a four-year hiatus. As of 2025, a new ceremony has not been held.

== Awards ==
At the ceremony, Mariah Carey received the Pop Icon Award for having sold over 200 million records and having more number one singles in America than any other solo artist. Miley Cyrus received the award for world's Best Pop Rock Female Artist. She also won World's Best Video for "Wrecking Ball" and World's Best Female Artist voted by the fans. Han Geng received the awards for World's Best Male Artist voted by the fans. Big Time Rush received the award for World’s Best Live Act. Laura Pausini received an award for her 20 years of career. Ricky Martin received the Latin Legend Award for his global record sales.

== Delays and difficulties ==
The 22nd edition of the World Music Awards had been scheduled to be held December 20, 2012 at Miami's Marlins Park, but was canceled days beforehand due to issues with visa approval for artists coming in for the ceremony and in its own statement, out of respect to victims of the Sandy Hook Elementary School shooting.

The show was not held in 2013, and then was to return in mid-May 2014. The organization came to an agreement with the American NBC network to broadcast the ceremony with a tape delay on May 28. Delays due to talent and technical difficulties caused the event to be delayed until May 27, and the shows' executive producers failed to deliver the show to NBC in time for it to be broadcast due to further delays, which included the late arrival of Mariah Carey to the ceremony, all factors which caused the ceremony to run 4 hours over its original taping schedule. Sharon Stone had been slated to host the ceremony, but pulled out at the last minute due to a payment dispute with the WMA organizing body. Likewise, a scheduled livestream of the red carpet via the website of music industry publication Billboard was called off due to further technical issues.

Pamela Anderson and Jason Derulo stepped in to host the ceremony at the last minute. NBC never received a final cut of the ceremony from the show's executive producers, and substituted it on May 28 with a time-stretched rerun of the premiere of that season's America's Got Talent.

== Winners ==
- World's Best-Selling Recording Act: One Direction
- World's Best Female Artist (voted by the fans): Miley Cyrus
- World's Best Male Artist (voted on by fans): Han Geng
- World's Best-Selling Group: One Direction
- World's Best-Selling Artist: Eminem
- World's Best-Selling Pop Act: One Direction
- World's Best Pop Artist (voted by the Fans): Justin Bieber
- World’s Best-Selling Pop Rock Male Artist: Justin Timberlake
- World's Best-Selling Pop Rock Female Artist: Miley Cyrus
- World’s Best-Selling Rock Act: Imagine Dragons
- World’s Best-Selling R & B Act: Beyoncé
- World’s Best-Selling Rap/Hip Hop Act: Eminem
- World's Best-Selling Alternative Act: Lorde
- World's Best Alternative Act (voted by the fans): Fall Out Boy
- World’s Best-Selling EDM Act: Daft Punk
- World's Best EDM Artist (voted by the fans): Avicii
- World's Best-Selling New Artist: Lorde
- World's Best Video: Miley Cyrus – "Wrecking Ball"
- World's Best Fanbase: Britney Spears

National Best-selling Artists

- Best-Selling Algerian Artist: Khaled
- Best-Selling American Artist: Eminem
- Best-Selling Australasian Artist: Lorde
- Best-Selling Azerbaijan Artist: Emin
- Best-Selling Benelux Artist: Stromae
- Best-Selling Canadian Artist: Michael Bublé
- Best-Selling Chinese Artist: Chris Lee
- Best-Selling British Act: One Direction
- Best-Selling Egyptian Artist: Amr Diab
- Best-Selling French Artist: Daft Punk
- Best-Selling German Artist: Helene Fischer
- Best-Selling Indonesian Artist: Anggun
- Best-Selling Italian Artist: Laura Pausini
- Best-Selling Lebanese Act: Nancy Ajram
- Best-Selling Korean Act: EXO
- Best-Selling Latin Artist: Shakira
- Best-Selling Japanese Artist: AKB48
- Best-Selling Moroccan Artist: Samira Said
- Best-Selling Philippines Artist: Sarah Geronimo
- Best-Selling Portuguese Artist: Tony Carreira
- Best-Selling Russian Artist: Grigory Leps
- Best-Selling Scandinavian Artist: Avicii
- Best-Selling Spanish Artist: David Bisbal
- Best-Selling Vietnam Artst: My Tam

Legend Awards

- Greek Legend: Sakis
- Latin Legend: Ricky Martin
- Outstanding Contribution to Dance Music: Flo Rida
- Pop Icon Award: Mariah Carey
- Best-Selling No.1 Singles Female Artist in America of All Time: Mariah Carey
- Special Achievement: Katy Perry
