= Voice of Asia =

Music festival in Almaty, Kazakhstan

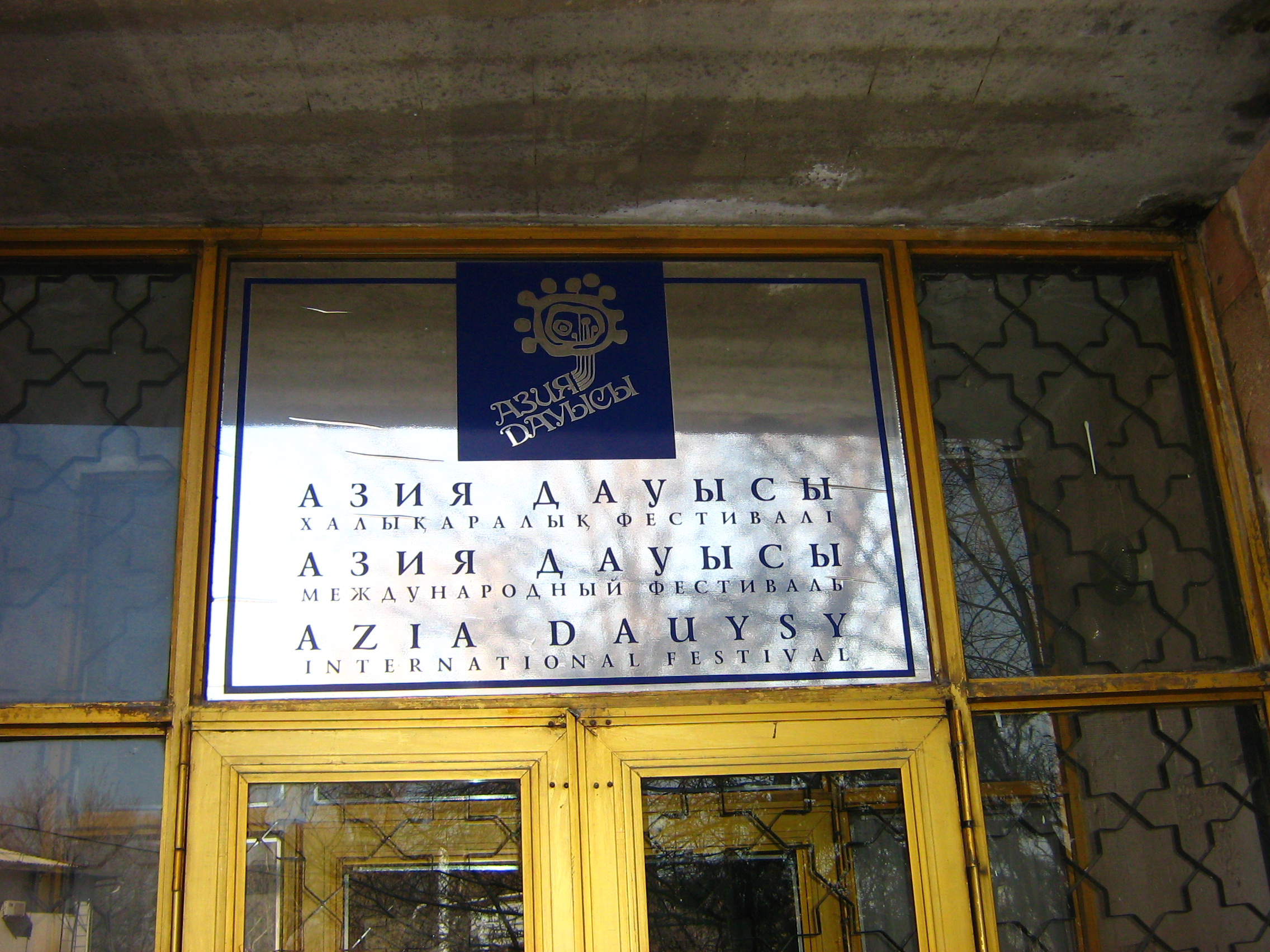
VOA's head office in Almaty

Voice of Asia (Kazakh: Азия Дауысы, Azııa Daýysy; Russian: Голос Азии, Golos Azii) is a music festival that has been held annually in Almaty, Kazakhstan since 1990. It features artists from all over Asia, Eastern Europe and other regions. The usual venue for the festival is the outdoor skating rink "Medeu", located on the mountainous outskirts of the Tian Shan, a few kilometers from the center of Almaty. The festival program includes concerts by popular performers and a vocal competition. Over the years, the festival's headliners have included international pop music stars such as Gloria Gaynor, Alla Pugacheva, Toto Cutugno, Patricia Kaas, Valery Leontiev, Boney M., Bаccara, Secret Service, Black Eyed Peas and others. In 2024, Jason Derulo gave his first solo concert in Almaty.

In 2005 the event was suspended due to lack of funds. The festival has resumed in 2023.

== Singing competition summary ==
Year	Grand-Prix Winner	1 Prize Golden Trophy	2 Prize Silver Trophy	3 Prize Bronze Trophy
2004	(Romania) Nico	(Indonesia) Eka Deli	(Philippines) Sheryn Regis (Malaysia) Waheeda	(Kazakhstan) Alden Zhaksybekov
2003	(China) Xu Yang (徐洋)	(Romania) Luminita Anghel	(Philippines) Jed Madela (Malta) Lawrence Gray	(Kazakhstan) Marzhan Arapbaeva (Sri Lanka) Charles Markterdin
2002	(Malaysia) Siti Nurhaliza	(Georgia (country)) Veriko Turashvili	(Kazakhstan) Tahmina Ashimbekova (Philippines) Arnee Hidalgo	(Kazakhstan) Aldabergenov Zhaksybayev (Bulgaria) Roberts
2001	(Philippines) Ladine Roxas	(Federal Republic of Yugoslavia) Ruzica Cavic	(Sri Lanka) Bathiya and Santhush (China) Liu Xiaochun (刘晓春)	(Kazakhstan) Altynai Zhorabayeva (Finland) Jay Day
2000	(Romania) Monica Anghel	(Malaysia) Anis Suraya	(China) Sun Jie (孙洁) (Kazakhstan) Gulnur Orazymbetova	(Indonesia) Glenn Fredly
1999	(Azerbaijan) Manana Japaridze	(Indonesia) Edo Condologit	(China) Ding Dan (丁丹) (Moldova) Nelly Ciobanu	(Republic of Ireland) Jimbo
1998	(Italy) Luca Sepe	(Kazakhstan) Vladimir Stupin	(China) Tan Jing (Albania) Elza Lila	(Togo) Afia Mala
1997	(Indonesia) AB-3	(China) Guo Rong (郭蓉)	(Malaysia) Zamani slam	
1996	(Kazakhstan) Bauyrzhan Isaev			
1995	(United States) Barth Beasley	(Malaysia) Ziana Zain	(Bulgaria) Deyan Nedelchev	
1994	(Turkey) Suavi Saygan			
1993	(Mongolia) Sara			
1992	(Turkey) Sehnaz			
1991	(Philippines) Geneva Cruz	(Tajikistan) Nargis Bandishoeva	(Uzbekistan) Yulduz Usmonova	
1990	(Uzbek Soviet Socialist Republic) Kars	(Mongolia) Chinggis khan		

== See also ==
- Our Sound
- Asia Song Festival
- Asian Wave
- Asia New Singer Competition
