= Dencia =

Cameroonian singer, entrepreneur and designer

Reprudencia Sonkey
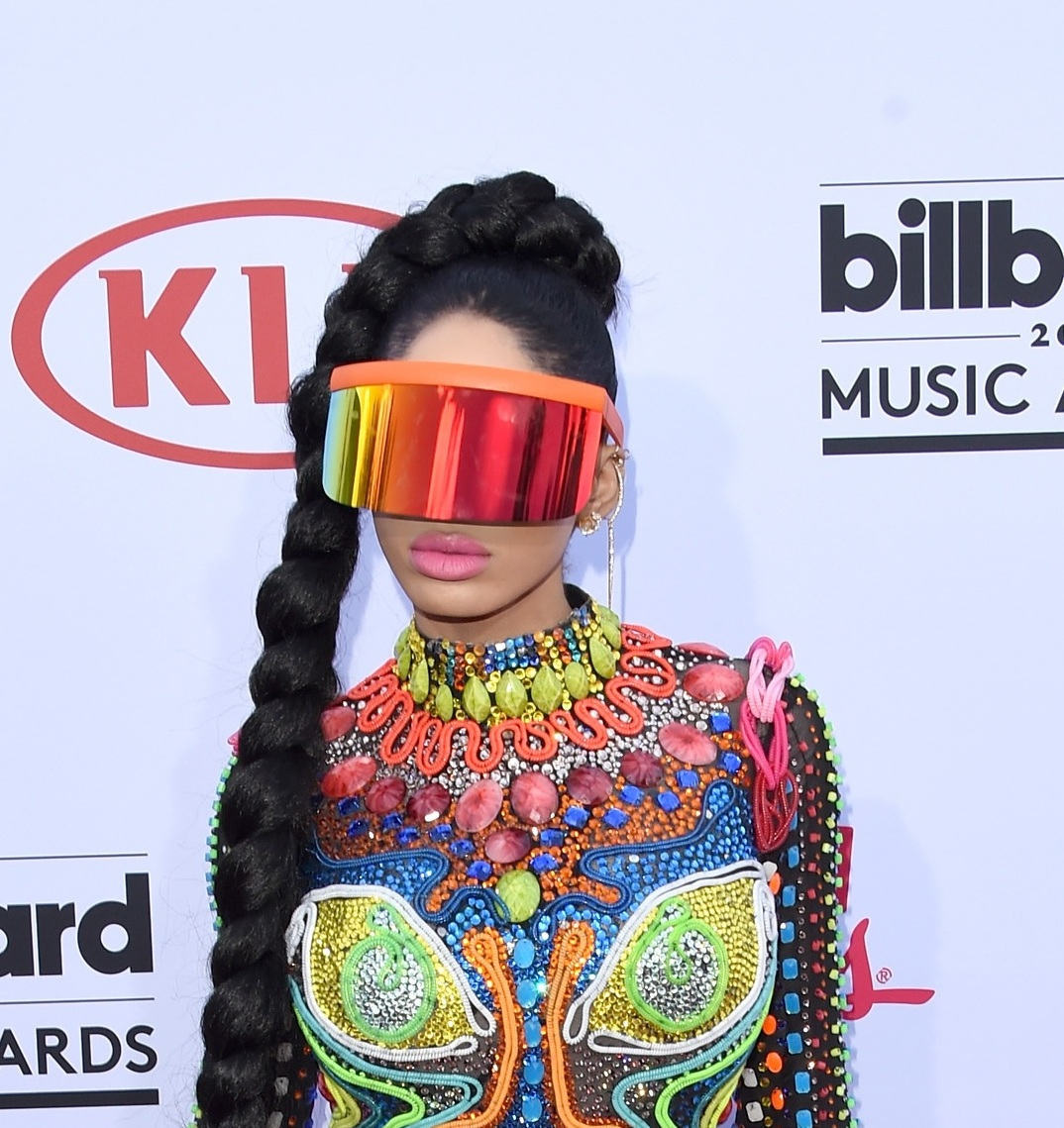
- Born: Reprudencia Sonkey; March 26, 1992 (age 34); Cameroon
- Other name: Dencia
- Occupations: Singer; businesswoman; fashion designer; actress; DJ; philanthropist
- Website: denciaonline.com

Reprudencia Sonkey, known professionally as Dencia (born March 26, 1992) is a Cameroonian-Nigerian singer and designer. She was born in Yaounde, Cameroon Her mother was a Volleyball player. She was raised by her maternal grandparents as their child.

She started her career in Hollywood by being featured in music videos of artists like Chris Brown, 50 Cent, Lady Gaga, and Ludacris. She released her debut single "Beri Beri" in 2011.

As a designer, she has created looks for artists like Nicki Minaj, Rihanna, Christina Milian, Lil’ Mama and more. Dencia is known for her own fashion statements and appearances on red carpets at the Billboard Music Awards, the Grammys, and the American Music Awards.

In 2012, Dencia launched her first skincare line, Whitenicious, which included skin lightening and brightening creams.
